= 1926 =

1926 in various calendars
- Gregorian calendar: 1926; MCMXXVI
- Ab urbe condita: 2679
- Armenian calendar: 1375; ԹՎ ՌՅՀԵ
- Assyrian calendar: 6676
- Baháʼí calendar: 82–83
- Balinese saka calendar: 1847–1848
- Bengali calendar: 1332–1333
- Berber calendar: 2876
- British Regnal year: 16 Geo. 5 – 17 Geo. 5
- Buddhist calendar: 2470
- Burmese calendar: 1288
- Byzantine calendar: 7434–7435
- Chinese calendar: 乙丑年 (Wood Ox); 4623 or 4416 — to — 丙寅年 (Fire Tiger); 4624 or 4417
- Coptic calendar: 1642–1643
- Discordian calendar: 3092
- Ethiopian calendar: 1918–1919
- Hebrew calendar: 5686–5687
- Hindu calendars
- Vikram Samvat: 1982–1983
- Shaka Samvat: 1847–1848
- Kali Yuga: 5026–5027
- Holocene calendar: 11926
- Igbo calendar: 926–927
- Iranian calendar: 1304–1305
- Islamic calendar: 1344–1345
- Japanese calendar: Taishō 15 / Shōwa 1 (昭和元年)
- Javanese calendar: 1856–1857
- Juche calendar: 15
- Julian calendar: Gregorian minus 13 days
- Korean calendar: 4259
- Minguo calendar: ROC 15 民國15年
- Nanakshahi calendar: 458
- Thai solar calendar: 2468–2469
- Tibetan calendar: ཤིང་མོ་གླང་ལོ་ (female Wood-Ox); 2052 or 1671 or 899 — to — མེ་ཕོ་སྟག་ལོ་ (male Fire-Tiger); 2053 or 1672 or 900

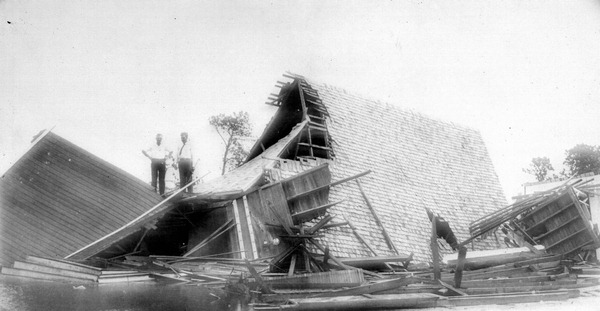
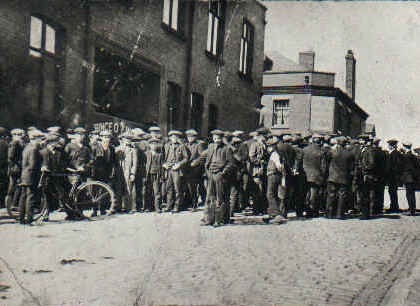
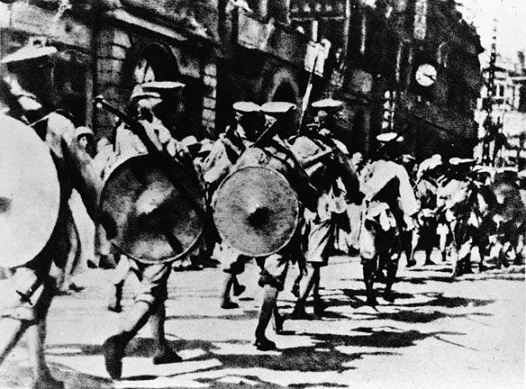
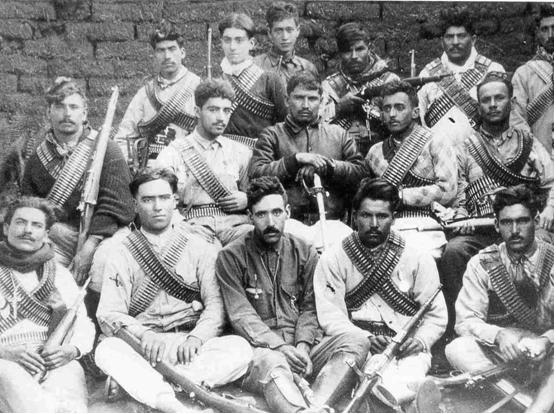
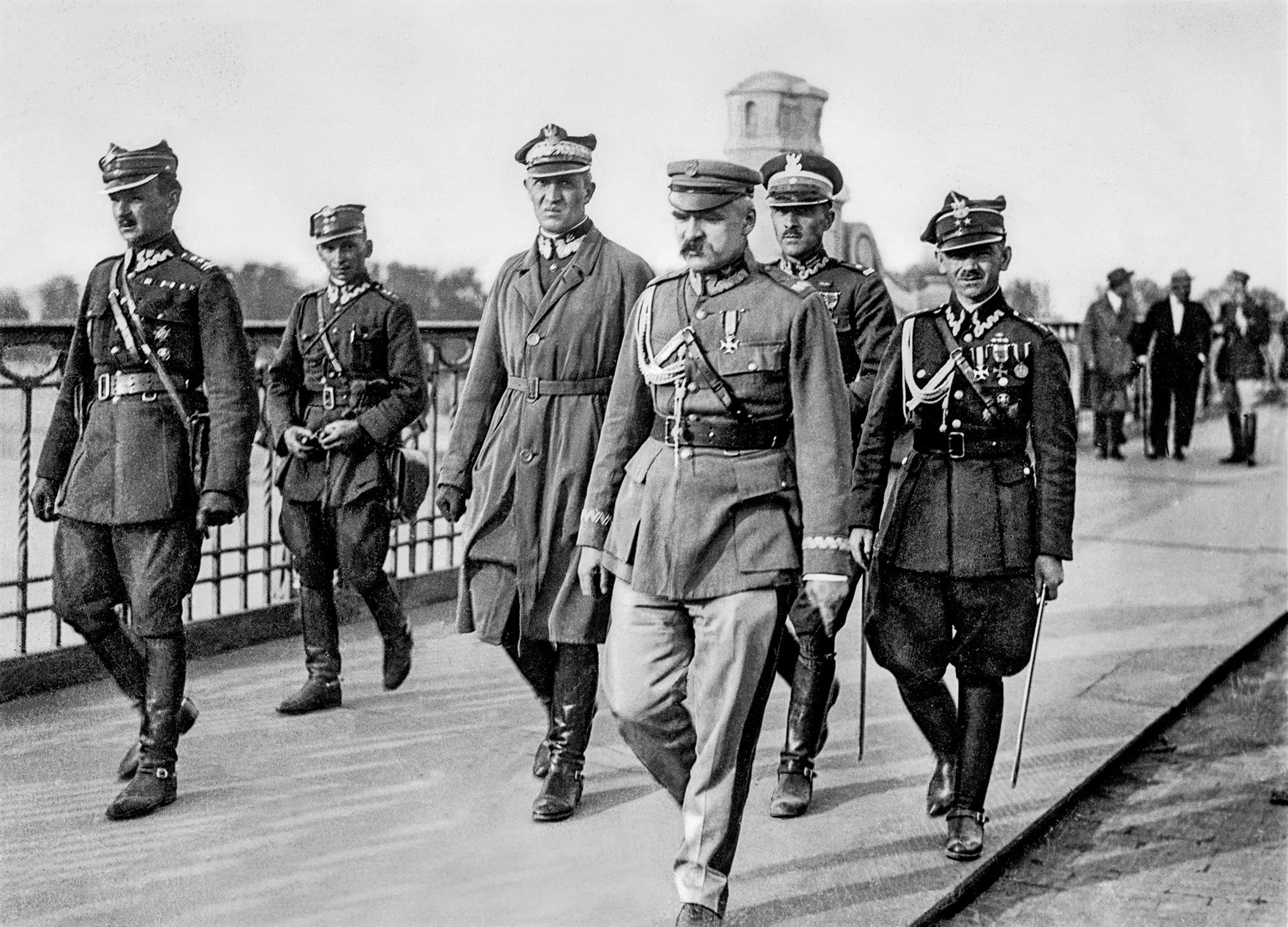
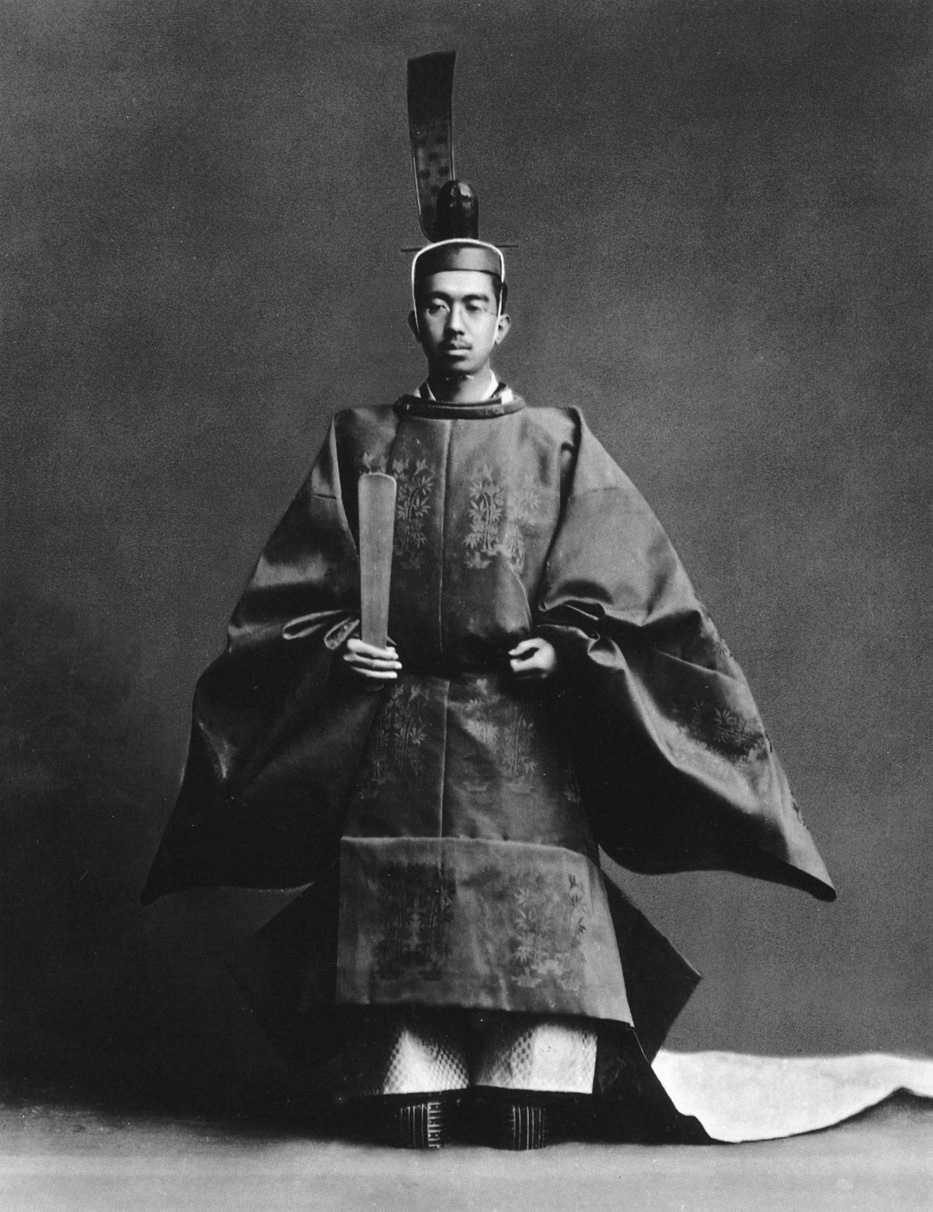
From top to bottom, left to right:
- The 1926 Miami hurricane devastates southern Florida and parts of the Caribbean, killing hundreds and causing massive destruction;
- The 1926 United Kingdom general strike brings the nation to a standstill as millions of workers walk out in support of coal miners;
- The Northern Expedition is launched by the Kuomintang to unify China under its rule, marking a turning point in the Chinese Civil War;
- The Cristero War erupts in Mexico as Catholic rebels take up arms against the government’s anti-clerical policies;
- The May Coup sees Marshal Józef Piłsudski overthrow the government in a three-day military coup;
- Hirohito ascends the throne as Emperor of Japan, beginning the Shōwa era.

1926 (MCMXXVI) was a common year starting on Friday of the Gregorian calendar, the 1926th year of the Common Era (CE) and Anno Domini (AD) designations, the 926th year of the 2nd millennium, the 26th year of the 20th century, and the 7th year of the 1920s decade.

== Events ==
=== January ===
- January 3 – Theodoros Pangalos declares himself dictator in Greece.
- January 8
  - Ibn Saud is crowned ruler of the Kingdom of Hejaz.
  - Crown Prince Nguyễn Phúc Vĩnh Thuy ascends the throne as Bảo Đại, the last monarch of the Nguyễn dynasty of the Kingdom of Vietnam.
- January 16 – A British Broadcasting Company radio play by Ronald Knox about workers' revolution in London causes a panic among those who have not heard the preliminary announcement that it is a satire on broadcasting.
- January 21 – The Belgian Parliament accepts the Locarno Treaties.
- January 26 – Scottish inventor John Logie Baird demonstrates a mechanical television system at his London laboratory for members of the Royal Institution and a reporter from The Times.
- January 31 – British and Belgian troops leave Cologne.

=== February ===
- February 1 – Land on Broadway and Wall Street in New York City is sold at a record $7 per sq inch; it is only affordable for four more years.
- February 12 – The Irish minister for Justice, Kevin O'Higgins, appoints the Committee on Evil Literature.
- February 20 – The Berlin International Green Week, a food and agriculture fair, debuts in Germany.
- February 25 – Francisco Franco becomes General in Spain.

=== March ===
March 16: Goddard with rocket in 1926.

- March 6
  - The Shakespeare Memorial Theatre in Stratford-upon-Avon (England) is destroyed by fire.
  - The first commercial air route from the United Kingdom to South Africa is established by Alan Cobham.
- March 14 – El Virilla train accident in Costa Rica: 385 people are killed and 93 injured when an overloaded pilgrim special derails on a bridge. The SS Ile de france Was Launched at Chantiers de l'Atlantique shipyards in Saint Nazaire, France As one of the first ships to embrace the Art Deco style
- March 16 – Robert H. Goddard launches the first liquid-fuel rocket, at Auburn, Massachusetts.
- March 23 – Éamon de Valera organises the political party Fianna Fáil in Ireland.

=== April ===
- April 4 – Greek dictator Theodoros Pangalos wins the presidential election, with 93.3% of the vote; turnout is light, as the result is considered a foregone conclusion.
- April 6 – Aarón Joaquín has a vision in the Nuevo León state of Mexico, origin of La Luz del Mundo, a nontrinitarian charismatic restorationist Christian church.
- April 7 – An assassination attempt against Italian Fascist leader Benito Mussolini fails.
- April 17 – Zhang Zuolin's army captures Beijing.
- April 24 – Treaty of Berlin: Germany and the Soviet Union each pledge neutrality in the event of an attack on the other by a third party, for the next five years.
- April 25 – Reza Khan is crowned Shah of Iran, under the name "Pahlevi".
- April 30 – A state of emergency is proclaimed in the United Kingdom under the Emergency Powers Act 1920 on account of the "threat of cessation of work in Coal Mines".

=== May ===
- May 4 – The United Kingdom general strike begins at midnight, in support of a strike by coal miners.
- May 9
  - The French navy bombards Damascus, because of Druze riots.
  - Explorer Richard E. Byrd and co-pilot Floyd Bennett claim to be the first to fly over the North Pole in the Josephine Ford monoplane, taking off from Spitsbergen, Norway and returning 15 hours and 44 minutes later. Both men are immediately hailed as national heroes, though some experts have since been skeptical of the claim, believing that the plane was unlikely to have covered the entire distance and back in that short an amount of time. An entry in Byrd's diary, discovered in 1996, suggests that the plane actually turned back 150 miles short of the North Pole, due to an oil leak.
- May 10 – Planes piloted by Major Harold Geiger and Horace Meek Hickam, students at the United States Air Corps Tactical School, collide in mid-air at Langley Field, Virginia.
- May 12
  - Roald Amundsen and his crew fly over the North Pole, in the airship Norge.
  - The United Kingdom general strike is called off by the trade unions, although miners remain on strike.
- May 12–14 – May Coup: Józef Piłsudski takes over in Poland.
- May 18 – Evangelist Aimee Semple McPherson disappears, while visiting a Venice, California beach. She reappears nearly a month later claiming to have been kidnapped.
- May 20 – The United States Congress passes the Air Commerce Act, licensing pilots and planes.
- May 23 – The first Lebanese constitution is established.
- May 26 – The Rif War ends, when Rif rebels surrender in Morocco.
- May 28 – The 1926 coup d'état, commanded by Manuel Gomes da Costa in Portugal, installs the Ditadura Nacional (National Dictatorship), followed by António de Oliveira Salazar's Estado Novo.

=== June ===
- June 4 – Ignacy Mościcki becomes president of Poland.
- June 7 – Liberal politician Carl Gustaf Ekman succeeds Rickard Sandler as Prime Minister of Sweden.
- June 12 – Lithuanian Radio launches its service from Kauno radiofonas.
- June 19 – King Roger, an opera about Roger II of Sicily by Karol Szymanowski, is premiered at the Grand Theatre in Warsaw.
- June 29 – Arthur Meighen briefly returns to office as Prime Minister of Canada during the King-Byng Affair.

=== July ===
- July 1 – The Kuomintang begins the Northern Expedition, a military unification campaign in northern China.
- July 3 – A Caudron C.61 aircraft, operated by Compagnie Internationale de Navigation Aérienne, crashes in Czechoslovakia.
- July 9 – In Portugal, General Óscar Carmona takes power in a military coup.
- July 10 – A bolt of lightning strikes Picatinny Arsenal in New Jersey; the resulting fire causes several million pounds of explosives to blow up in the next 2–3 days.
- July 15 – Bombay Electric Supply and Transport Company in India introduces motor buses.
- July 26 – The United States National Bar Association is incorporated.

=== August ===
- August 1 – In Mexico, the entry into force of anticlerical measures stipulated in the Constitution of 1917 causes the Cristero War from August 3.
- August 2 – The short-lived Western Australian Secession League is founded.
- August 5 – In New York, the Warner Brothers' Vitaphone system is experienced by audiences for the first time, in the movie Don Juan, starring John Barrymore.
- August 6 – American Gertrude Ederle becomes the first woman to swim the English Channel, from France to England.
- August 18 – In the United States, a weather map is televised for the first time, sent from NAA Arlington to the Weather Bureau office in Washington, D.C.
- August 22 – In Greece, Georgios Kondylis ousts Theodoros Pangalos.
- August 25 – Pavlos Kountouriotis announces that dictatorship has ended in Greece, and he is now the president.

=== September ===
- September 1 – Lebanon under the French Mandate gets its first constitution, thereby becoming a republic, with Charles Debbas as its president.
- September 8 – The German Weimar Republic joins the League of Nations.
- September 9 – Yleisradio (YLE), the Finnish national public broadcasting company, begins its broadcasts.
- September 11 – In Rome, Italy, Gino Lucetti throws a bomb at Benito Mussolini's car, but Mussolini is unhurt.
- September 14 – The Locarno Treaties of 1925 are ratified in Geneva, and come into effect.
- September 18 – Great Miami Hurricane: A strong hurricane devastates Miami, leaving over 100 dead and causing several hundred million dollars in damage (equal to nearly $100 billion in the modern day).
- September 19 – Giuseppe Meazza (San Siro) Stadium, well known among sports venues in Italy, officially opens in Milan.
- September 20 – The North Side Gang attempts to assassinate Al Capone, at the apex of his power at this time, spraying his headquarters in Cicero, Illinois with over a thousand rounds of machine gun fire in broad daylight, as Capone is eating there. Capone escapes harm.
- September 21 – French war ace René Fonck and three others attempt to fly the Atlantic, in pursuit of the Orteig Prize. Before the newsreel cameras at Roosevelt Field New York, the modified Sikorsky S-35 crashes on take-off and bursts into flames. Fonck survives, but two of his men are killed.
- September 23 – Gene Tunney defeats Jack Dempsey to become heavyweight boxing champion of the world.
- September 25
  - The League of Nations Slavery Convention abolishes all types of slavery.
  - William Lyon Mackenzie King returns to office as Prime Minister of Canada, after winning the Canadian federal election.
  - Henry Ford announces the 8-hour, 5-day work week.

=== October ===
- October 2 – Józef Piłsudski becomes prime minister of Poland.
- October 12 – British miners agree to end their strike.
- October 14 – A. A. Milne's children's book Winnie-the-Pooh is published in London, featuring the eponymous bear.
- October 16
  - An ammunition explosion on troopship Kuang Yuang near Jiujiang, China, kills 1,200.
  - Háry János, a Hungarian folk opera by Zoltán Kodály is premiered at the Royal Hungarian Opera House in Budapest.
- October 19 – The 1926 Imperial Conference opens in London.
- October 20 – A hurricane kills 650 in Cuba.
- October 23
  - Leon Trotsky and Lev Kamenev are removed from the Politburo of the Central Committee of the Communist Party of the Soviet Union.
  - A decree in Italy bans women from holding public office.
  - The Fazal Mosque, the first purpose-built in London and the first Ahmadiyya mosque in Britain, is completed.
- October 31 – Magician Harry Houdini dies of gangrene and peritonitis that has developed after his appendix ruptured.

=== November ===
- November 9 – Paul Hindemith's Cardillac premieres at the Staatsoper in Dresden, conducted by Fritz Busch.
- November 10 – In San Francisco, a necrophiliac serial killer named Earle Nelson (dubbed "Gorilla Man") kills and then rapes his 9th victim, a boarding house landlady named Mrs. William Edmonds.
- November 11 – The United States Numbered Highway System, including U.S. Route 66, is established.
- November 15
  - The NBC Radio Network opens in the United States with 24 stations (formed by Westinghouse, General Electric and RCA).
  - The Balfour Declaration is approved by the 1926 Imperial Conference, making the Commonwealth dominions equal and independent.
- November 24
  - The village of Rocquebillier, in the French Riviera, is almost destroyed in a massive hailstorm.
  - Sri Aurobindo withdraws into seclusion following a spiritual realisation, entrusting the supervision of the Sri Aurobindo Ashram to "The Mother".
- November 25 – The death penalty is re-established in Italy.
- November 26 – All Italian Communist deputies are arrested.
- November 27 – The restoration of Colonial Williamsburg begins in Williamsburg, Virginia, United States.

=== December ===
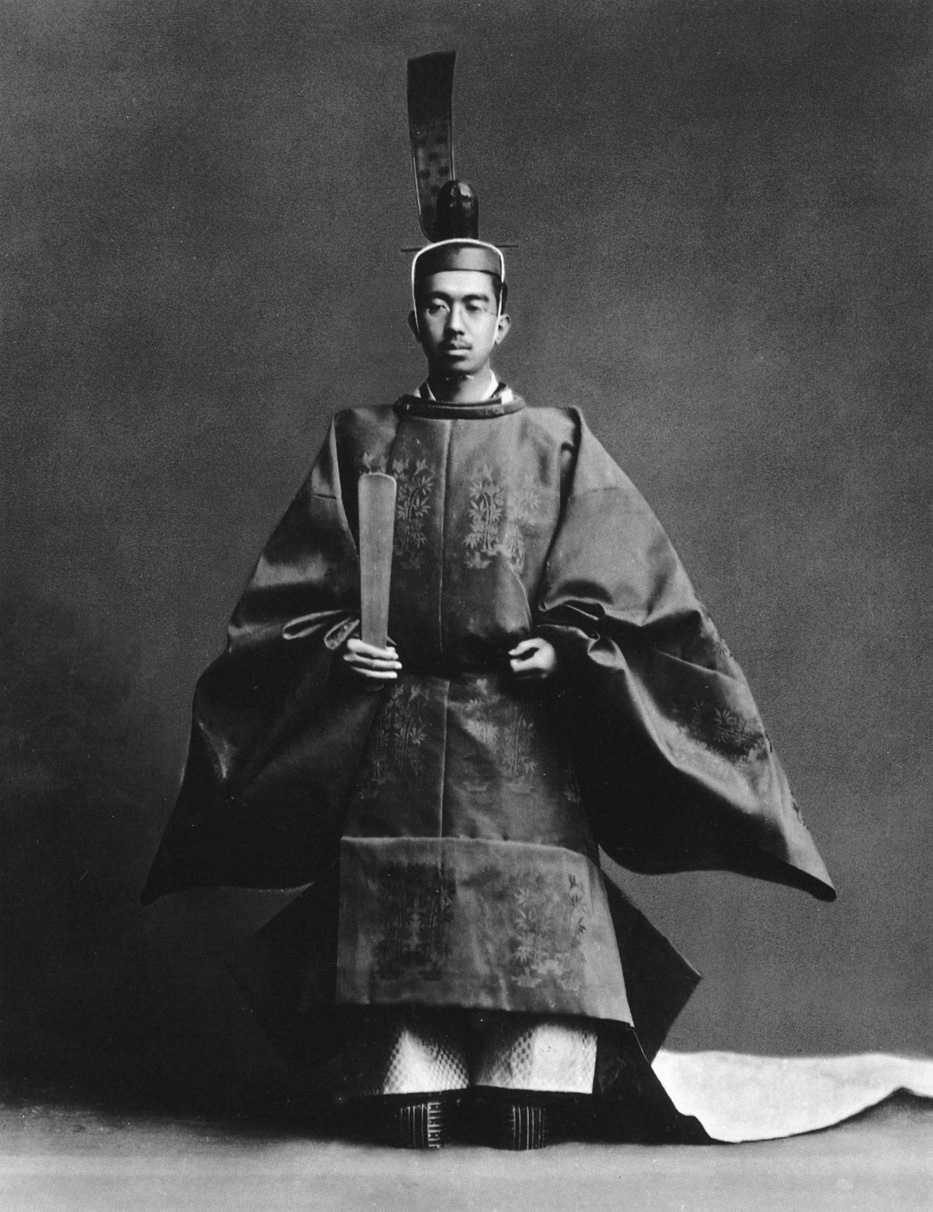
December 25: Emperor Hirohito

- December 2 – British prime minister Stanley Baldwin ends the state of emergency that had been declared due to the miners' strike.
- December 3 – Disappearance of Agatha Christie: English detective story writer Agatha Christie disappears from her home in Surrey; on December 14 she is found under her husband's mistress's name at a Harrogate hotel.
- December 7 – The Council for the Preservation of Rural England, later the Campaign to Protect Rural England (CPRE), is founded by Patrick Abercrombie to limit urban sprawl and ribbon development.
- December 13 – Miina Sillanpää becomes Finland's first female government minister.
- December 17 – 1926 Lithuanian coup d'état: A democratically elected government is overthrown in Lithuania; Antanas Smetona assumes power.
- December 23 – Nicaraguan President Adolfo Díaz requests U.S. military assistance in the ongoing civil war. American peacekeeping troops immediately set up neutral zones in Puerto Cabezas and at the mouth of the Rio Grande to protect American and foreign lives and property.
- December 26
  - In the history of Japan, the Shōwa period begins from this day, due to the death of Emperor Taishō on the day before. His son Hirohito will reign as Emperor of Japan until 1989.
  - World première of Finnish composer Jean Sibelius's tone poem Tapiola by Walter Damrosch and the New York Philharmonic, the last substantial composition to be made public by the composer for the remaining 30 years of his life.

=== Date unknown ===
- Muthulakshmi Reddi becomes the first woman to be appointed to a legislature in India, the Madras Legislative Council.
- Stephen H. Langdon begins excavations in Jemdet Nasr, finding proto-cuneiform clay tablets (3100–2900 BCE).
- Phencyclidine (PCP, angel dust) is first synthesized.
- Industrial output surpasses the level of 1913 in the USSR after a period of economic downturn.

== Births ==
=== January ===
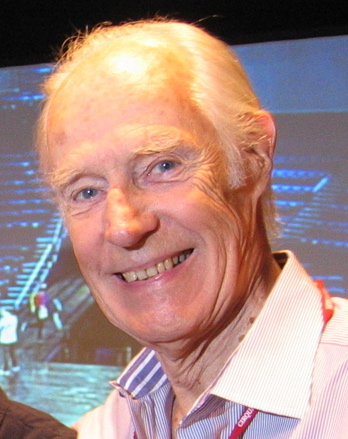
Sir George Martin

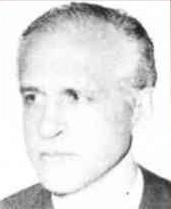
Ahmad Fuad Mohieddin

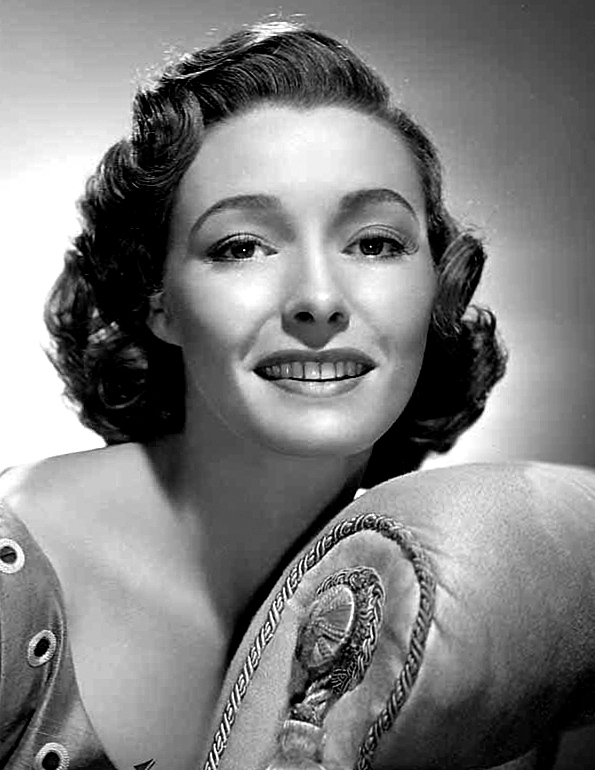
Patricia Neal

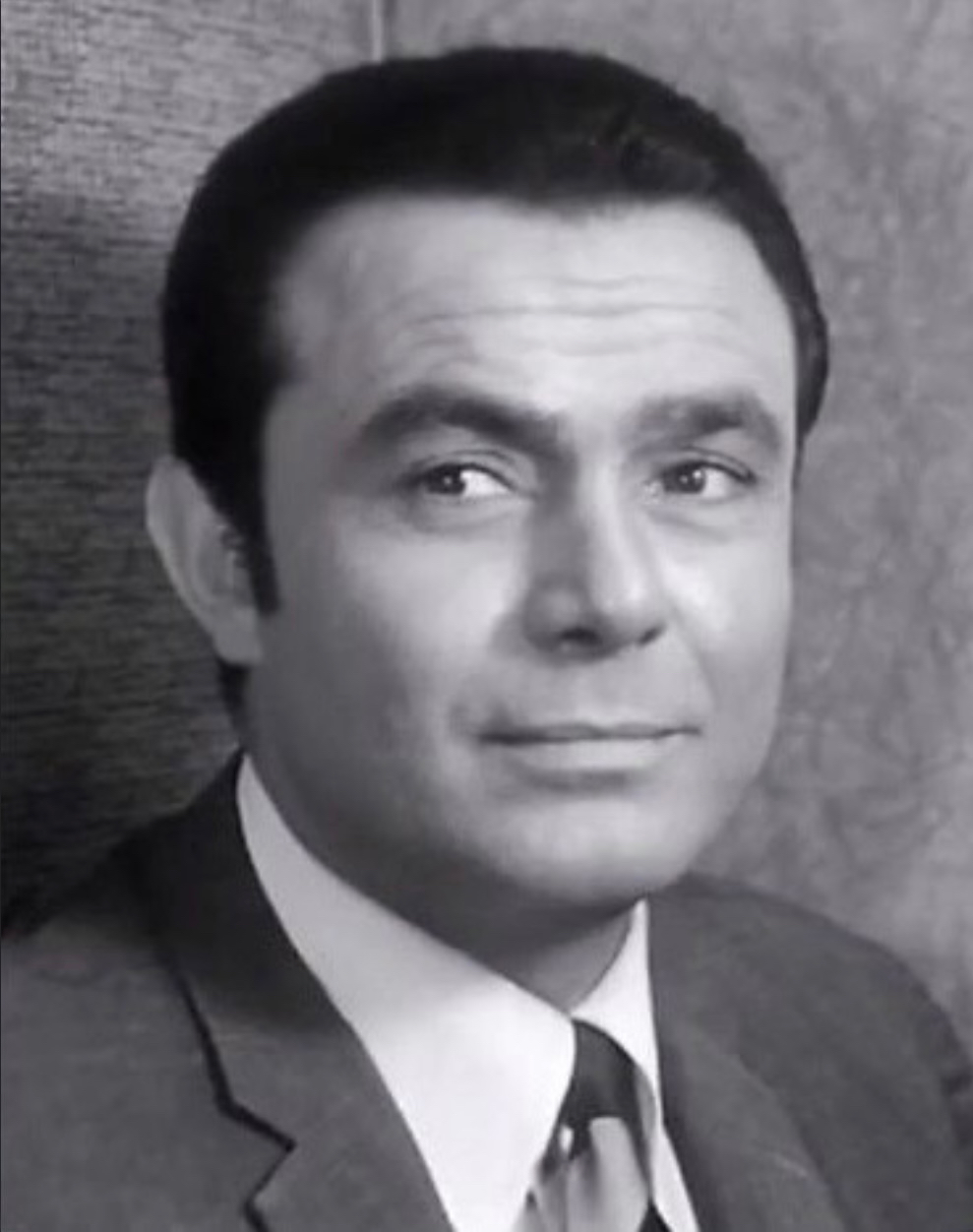
Salah Zulfikar

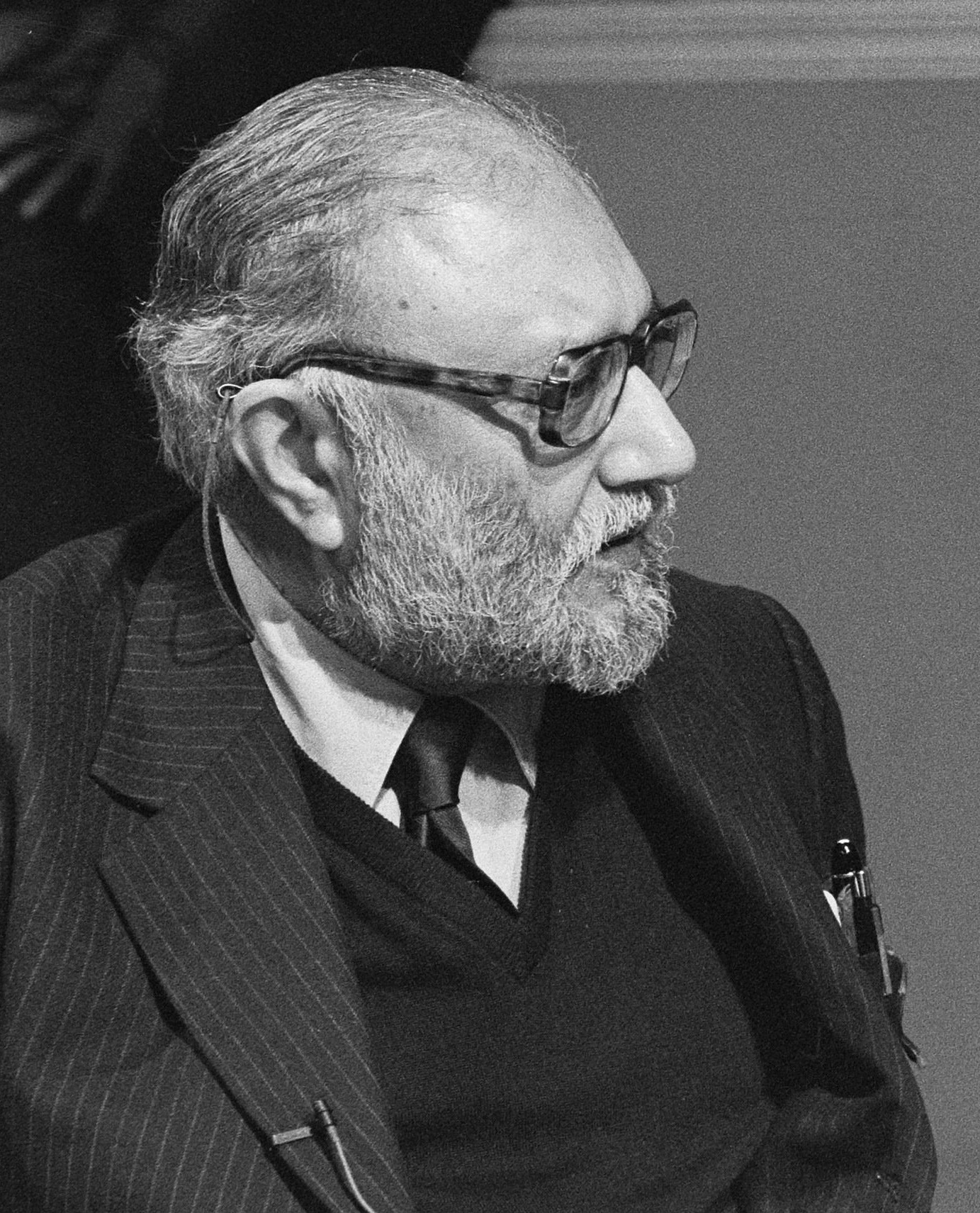
Abdus Salam

- January 1
  - Blanca Rodríguez, First Lady of Venezuela during the 1970s-1990s (d. 2020)
  - Claudio Villa, Italian singer (d. 1987)
- January 3
  - Mohamed Yaacob, Malaysian lawyer, judge and Menteri Besar of Kelantan (d. 2009)
  - Sir George Martin, English record producer (d. 2016)
- January 5 – Joshua Benjamin Jeyaretnam, Singaporean lawyer and politician (d. 2008)
- January 6 – Mickey Hargitay, Hungarian actor, bodybuilder (d. 2006)
- January 7 – Kim Jong-pil, South Korean politician (d. 2018)
- January 8 – Evelyn Lear, American soprano (d. 2012)
- January 10 – Júlio Pomar, Portuguese painter (d. 2018)
- January 11
  - Lev Dyomin, Soviet cosmonaut (d. 1998)
  - Ahmad Fuad Mohieddin, 42nd Prime Minister of Egypt (d. 1984)
- January 12
  - Ray Price, American country music singer and songwriter (d. 2013)
  - Morton Feldman, American composer (d. 1987)
- January 13 – Michael Bond, English fiction writer, creator of Paddington Bear (d. 2017)
- January 14 – Tom Tryon, American actor and novelist (d. 1991)
- January 15 – Maria Schell, Austrian actress (d. 2005)
- January 17
  - Antonio Domingo Bussi, Argentine Army general, former Governor of Tucuman (d. 2011)
  - Moira Shearer, Scottish actress, dancer (d. 2006)
- January 18
  - Hannie van Leeuwen, Dutch politician (d. 2018)
  - Salah Zulfikar, Egyptian actor and film producer (d. 1993)
- January 19
  - Fritz Weaver, American actor (d. 2016)
  - Jose Alfredo Jimenez, Mexican singer-songwriter (d. 1973)
- January 20 – Patricia Neal, American actress (d. 2010)
- January 21
  - Franco Evangelisti, Italian composer (d. 1980)
  - Steve Reeves, American actor (d. 2000)
  - Roger Taillibert, French architect (d. 2019)
- January 23 – Bal Thackeray, Indian politician (d. 2012)
- January 27 – Ingrid Thulin, Swedish actress (d. 2004)
- January 28 – Amin al-Hafez, 22nd Prime Minister of Lebanon (d. 2009)
- January 29
  - Bob Falkenburg, American tennis player and entrepreneur (d. 2022)
  - Abdus Salam, Pakistani physicist, Nobel Prize laureate (d. 1996)
- January 30 – Vasily Arkhipov, Soviet naval officer (d. 1998)

=== February ===
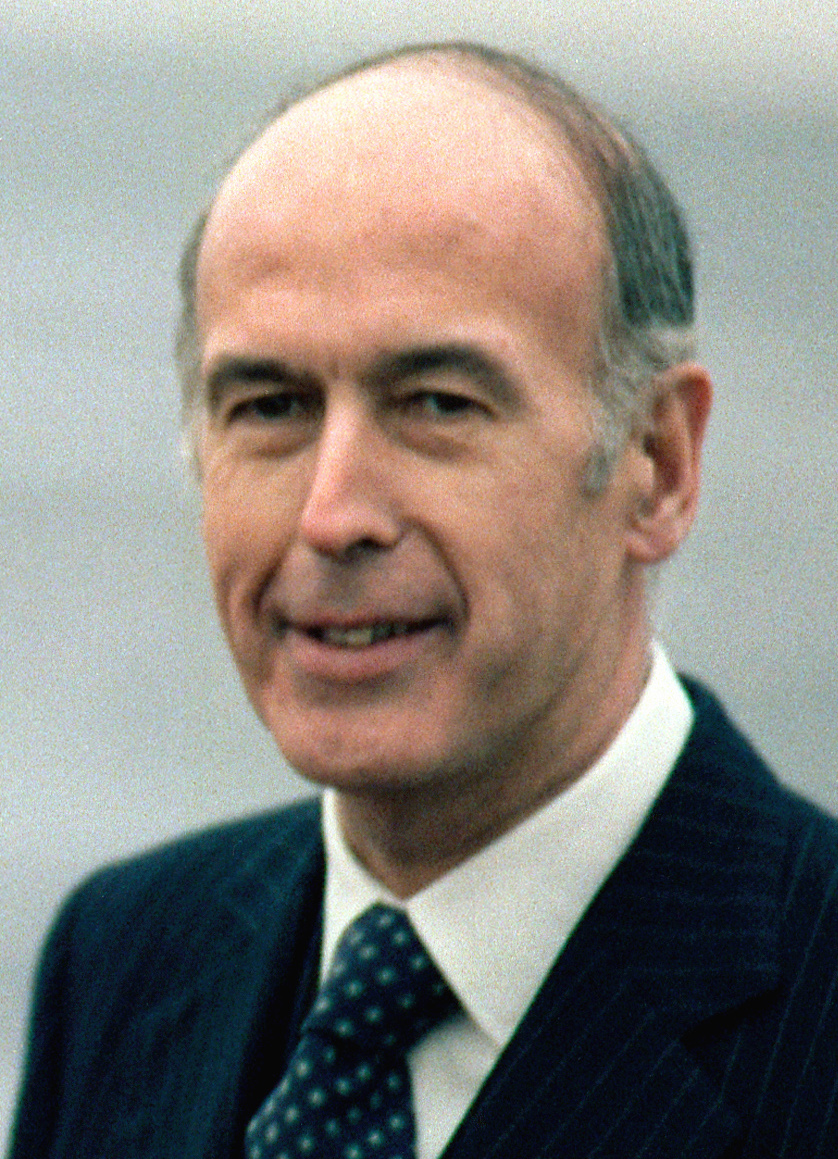
Valéry Giscard d'Estaing

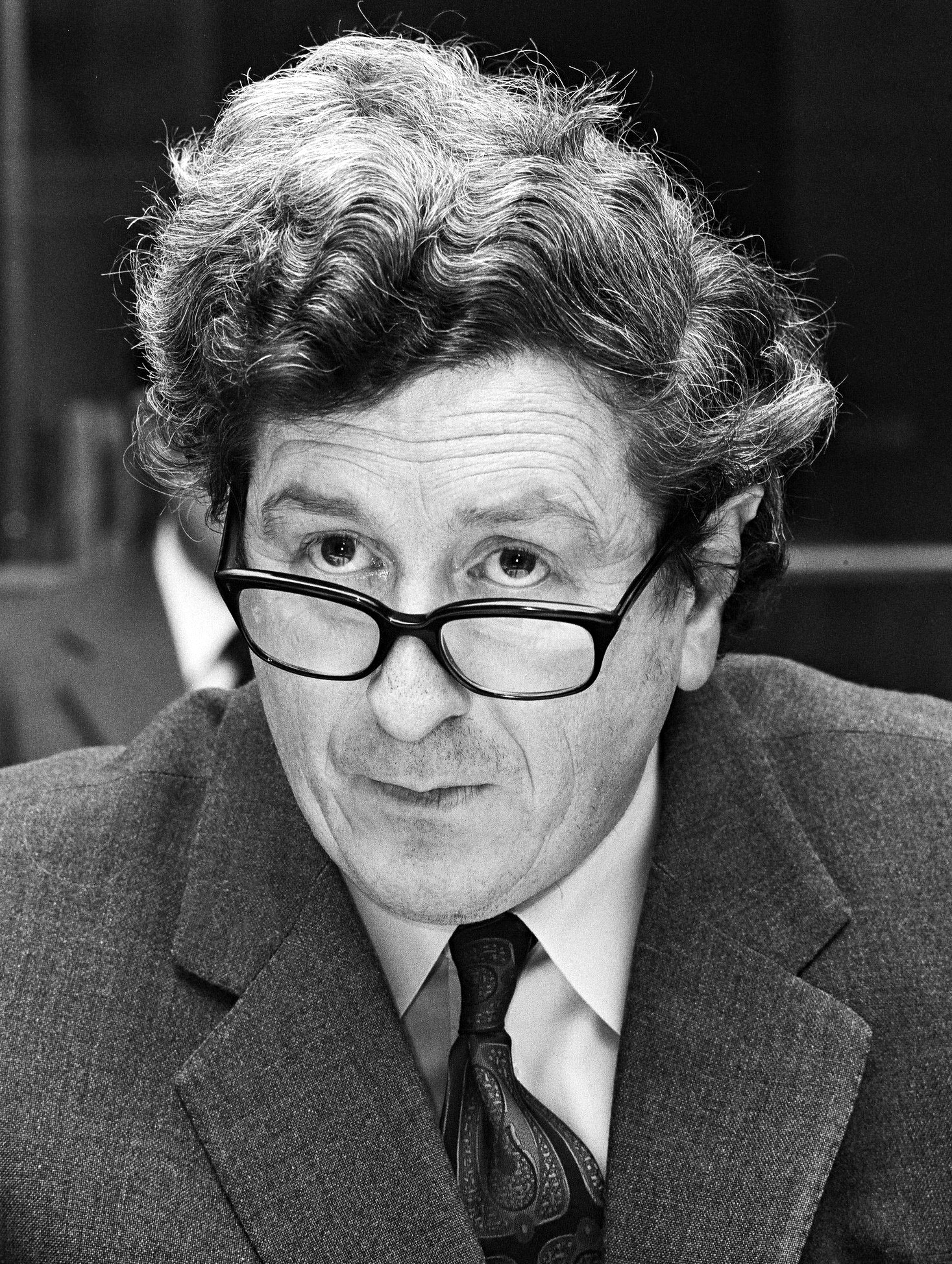
Garret FitzGerald

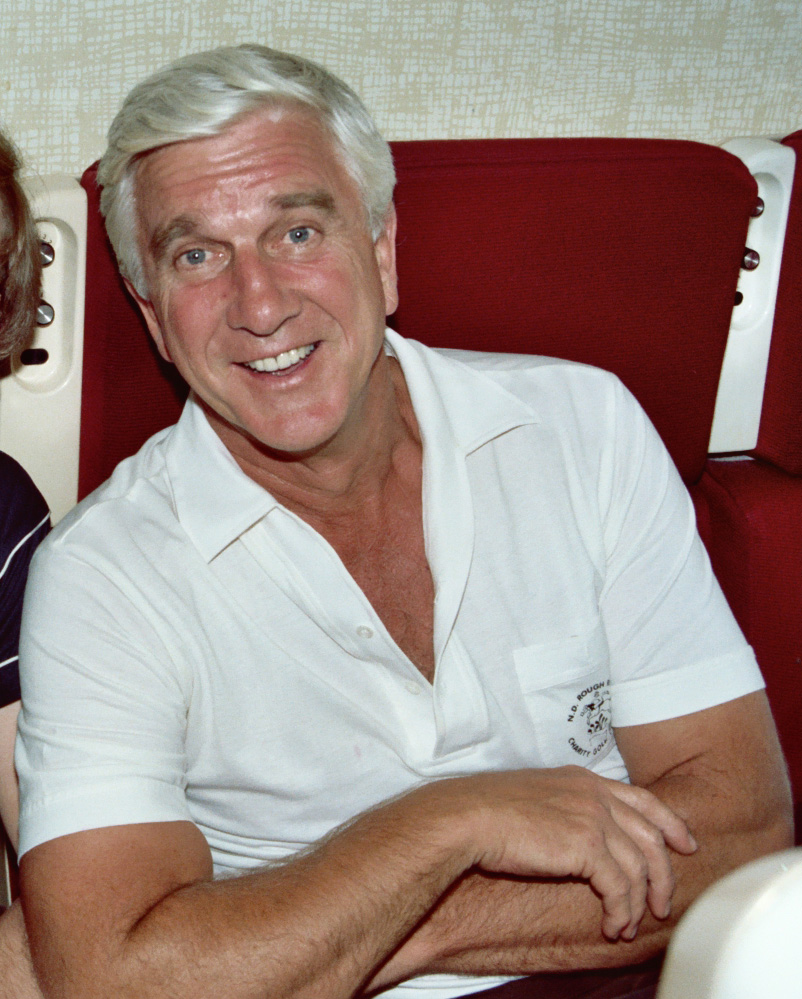
Leslie Nielsen

- February 1
  - Nancy Gates, American actress (d. 2019)
  - Vivian Maier, American street photographer (d. 2009)
- February 2
  - Valéry Giscard d'Estaing, President of France (d. 2020)
  - Miguel Obando y Bravo, Nicaraguan Roman Catholic prelate (archbishop of Managua, cardinal) (d. 2018)
- February 3 – Hans-Jochen Vogel, German politician (d. 2020)
- February 4 – Gyula Grosics, Hungarian footballer (d. 2014)
- February 6 – Vladimir Zamansky, Soviet and Russian stage and film actor
- February 7
  - Konstantin Feoktistov, Soviet cosmonaut (d. 2009)
  - Estanislao Esteban Karlic, Argentine cardinal (d. 2025)
  - Keiko Tsushima, Japanese actress (d. 2012)
- February 8
  - Neal Cassady, American writer (d. 1968)
  - Birgitte Reimer, Danish actress (d. 2021)
- February 9 – Garret FitzGerald, Irish lawyer, politician, and 7th Taoiseach of Ireland (d. 2011)
- February 10
  - Carmen Romano, First Lady of Mexico (d. 2000)
  - Danny Blanchflower, Northern Irish footballer, football manager (d. 1993)
- February 11
  - Paul Bocuse, French chef (d. 2018)
  - Leslie Nielsen, Canadian-American actor (d. 2010)
- February 12 – Charles Van Doren, American professor, subject of film Quiz Show (d. 2019)
- February 14 – Alfred Körner, Austrian footballer (d. 2020)
- February 15 – Muhammad al-Badr, King of Yemen (d. 1996)
- February 16 - John Schlesinger, British film director (d. 2003)
- February 17 – John Meyendorff, French-born American Orthodox scholar, protopresbyter and educator (d. 1992)
- February 18 – Jeanne Wilson, American swimmer (d. 2018)
- February 19 – György Kurtág, Hungarian composer and academic
- February 20
  - Richard Matheson, American author (d. 2013)
  - Bob Richards, American track and field athlete (d. 2023)
  - Gillian Lynne, English ballerina, dancer, choreographer, actress, and theatre-television director (d. 2018)
  - María de la Purísima Salvat Romero, Spanish nun, saint (d. 1998)
- February 22
  - Kenneth Williams, English actor (d. 1988)
  - Bud Yorkin, American television writer and producer (d. 2015)
- February 24 – Knut Kleve, Norwegian philologist (d. 2017)
- February 26 – Henry Molaison, American memory disorder patient (d. 2008)
- February 27 – David H. Hubel, Canadian neuroscientist, recipient of the Nobel Prize in Physiology or Medicine (d. 2013)
- February 28 – Svetlana Alliluyeva, Russian author (d. 2011)

=== March ===
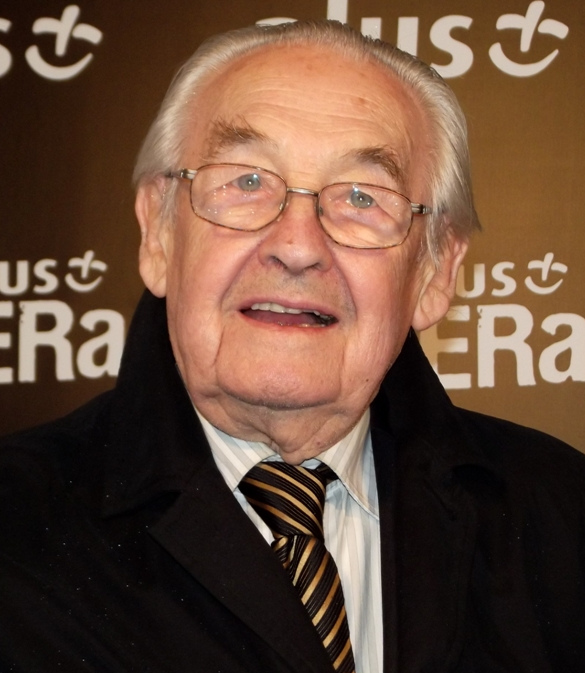
Andrzej Wajda

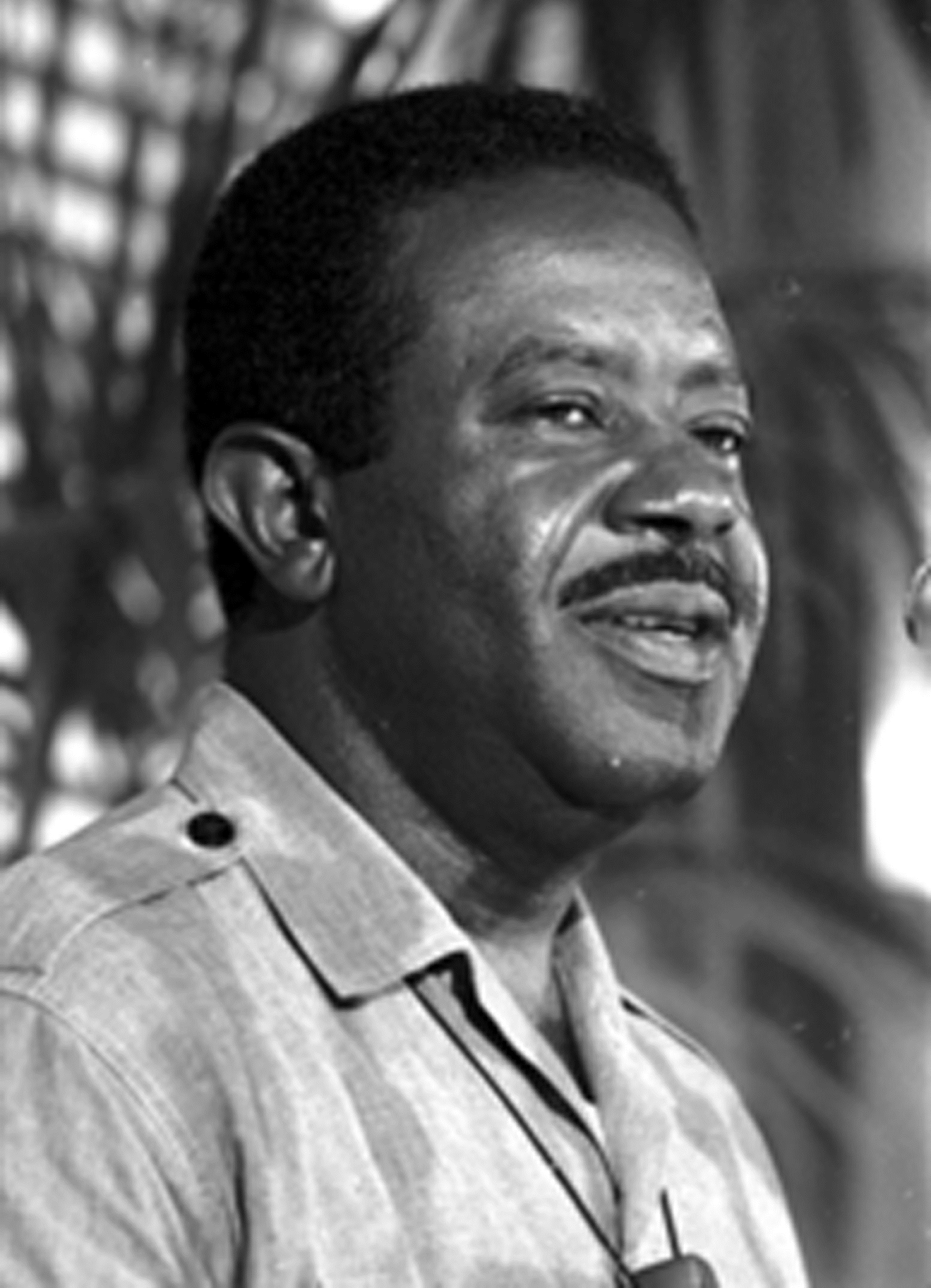
Ralph Abernathy

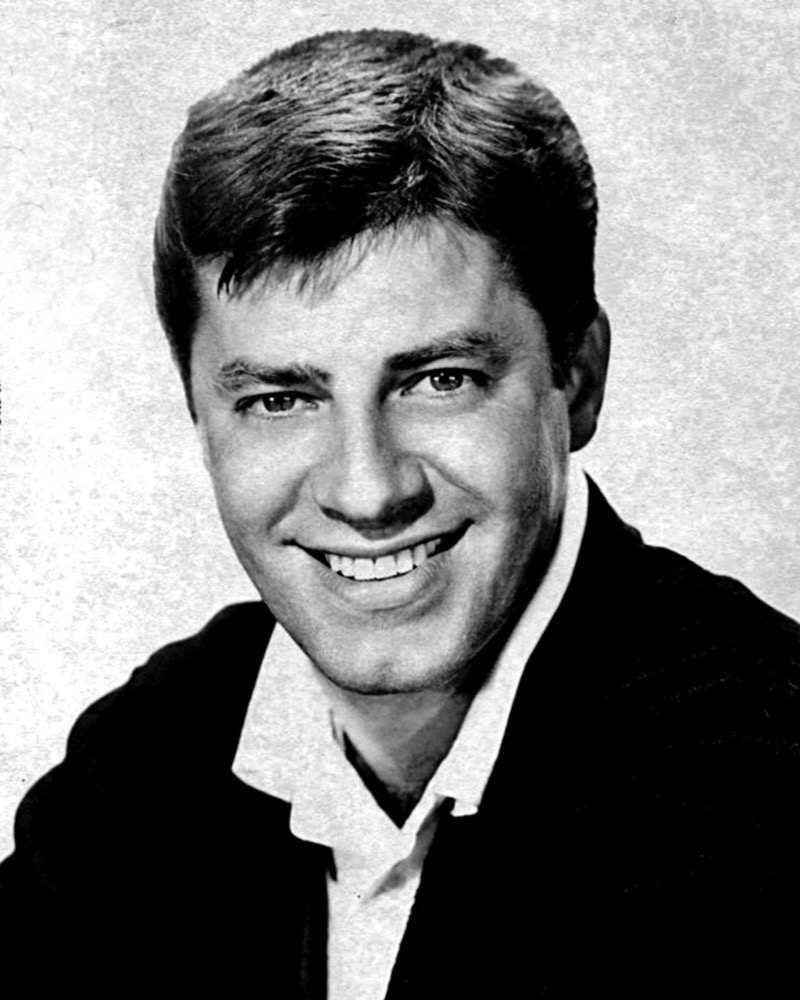
Jerry Lewis

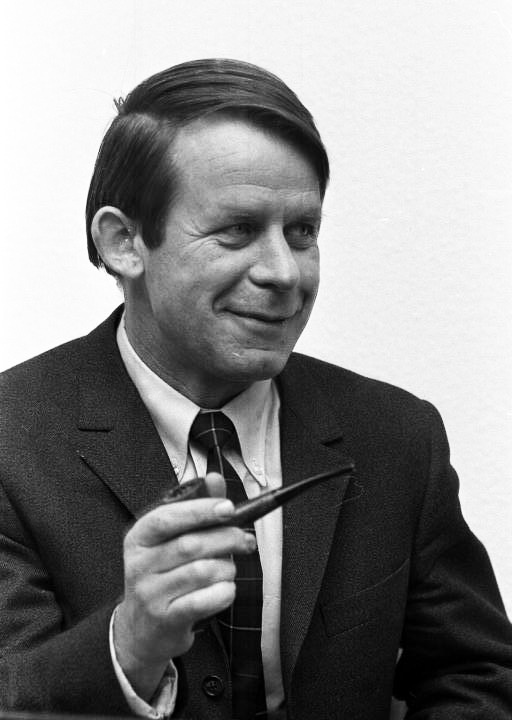
Siegfried Lenz

- March 2 – Murray Rothbard, American economist (d. 1995)
- March 3
  - Craig Dixon, American athlete (d. 2021)
  - James Merrill, American poet (d. 1995)
- March 4 – Prince Michel of Bourbon-Parma, French royal, businessman (d. 2018)
- March 6
  - Alan Greenspan, American economist, Federal Reserve Chairman (d. 2026)
  - Yoshimi Osawa, Japanese judoka (d. 2022)
  - Andrzej Wajda, Polish film director (d. 2016)
- March 8 – Sultan Salahuddin of Selangor (d. 2001)
- March 9 – Kemal Horulu, Turkish sprinter and pornographic film director (d. 1991)
- March 10 – Aleksandr Zatsepin, Soviet and Russian composer
- March 11
  - Syed Mansoor Ahmad Shah, Pakistani fighter pilot (d. 2013)
  - Ralph Abernathy, African-American civil rights leader (d. 1990)
  - Thomas Starzl, American physician (d. 2017)
- March 13 – Carlos Roberto Reina, President of Honduras (d. 2003)
- March 14 – Carlos Heitor Cony, Brazilian journalist, writer (d. 2018)
- March 16
  - Edwar al-Kharrat, Egyptian novelist, writer and critic (d. 2015)
  - Jerry Lewis, American comedian, humanitarian and philanthropist (known for The Nutty Professor) (d. 2017)
- March 17 – Siegfried Lenz, German writer (d. 2014)
- March 18
  - Peter Graves, American actor (d. 2010)
  - Tan Chin Nam, Malaysian businessman and racehorse owner (d. 2018)
- March 21 – Heikki Hasu, Finnish Olympic cross-country skier (d. 2025)
- March 23 – Berta Loran, Polish-born Brazilian actress (d. 2025)
- March 24
  - Dario Fo, Italian author, Nobel Prize laureate (d. 2016)
  - Desmond Connell, Irish cardinal (d. 2017)
- March 25
  - László Papp, Hungarian boxer (d. 2003)
  - Gene Shalit, American film critic (d. 2026)
- March 26 – Aldo Tarlao, Italian Olympic rower (d. 2018)
- March 28 – Cayetana Fitz-James Stuart, 18th Duchess of Alba, Spanish aristocrat (d. 2014)
- March 30
  - Ingvar Kamprad, Swedish businessman, founder of IKEA (d. 2018)
  - Peter Marshall, American singer, television host (Hollywood Squares) (d. 2024)
  - Sydney Chaplin, American actor (d. 2009)
- March 31 – John Fowles, English writer (d. 2005)

=== April ===
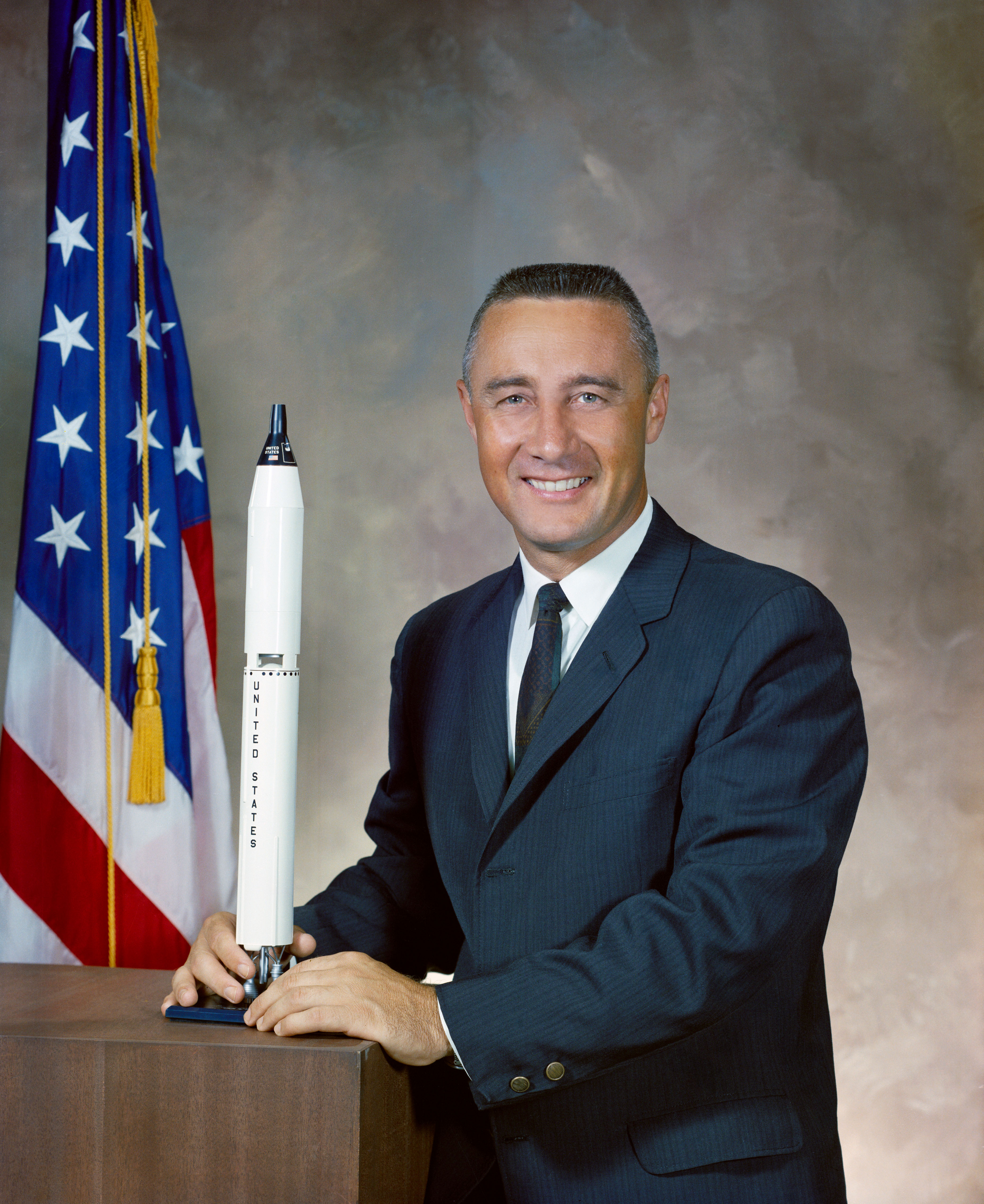
Gus Grissom

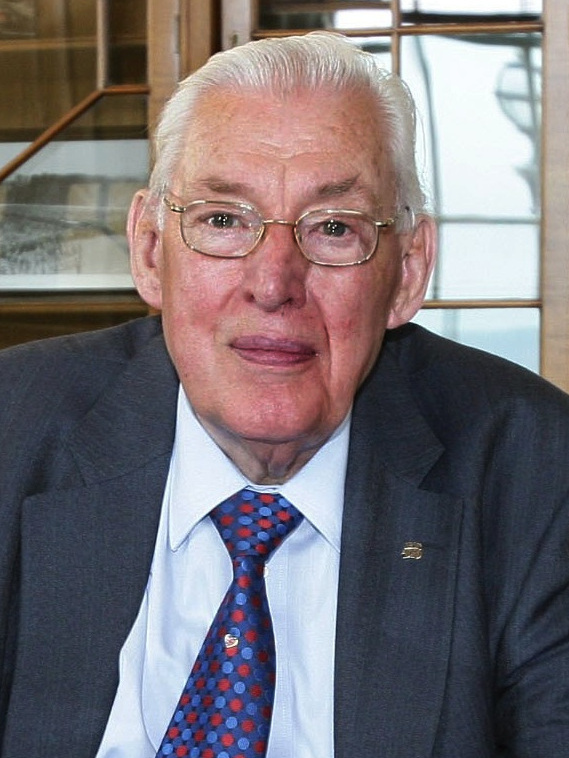
Ian Paisley

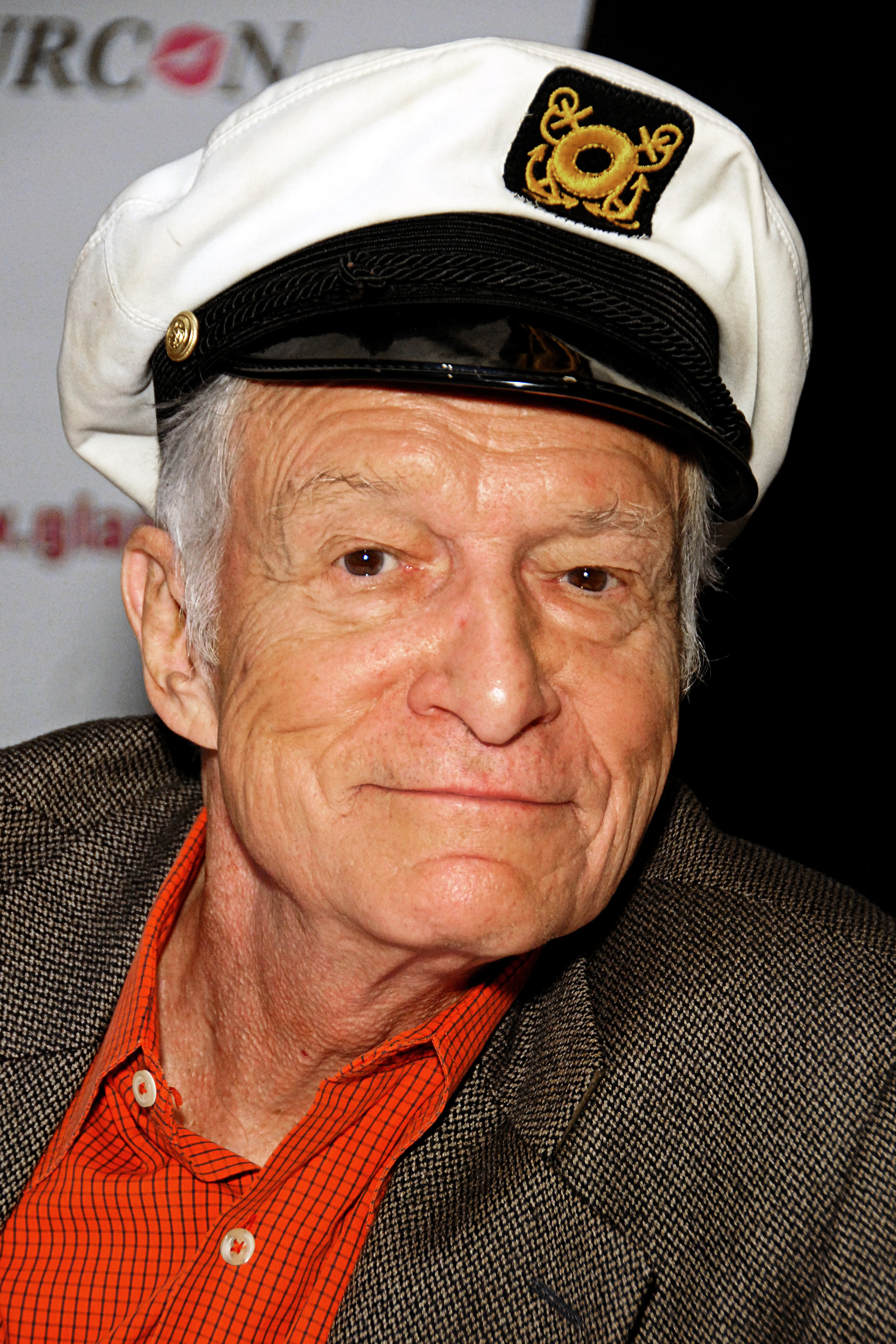
Hugh Hefner

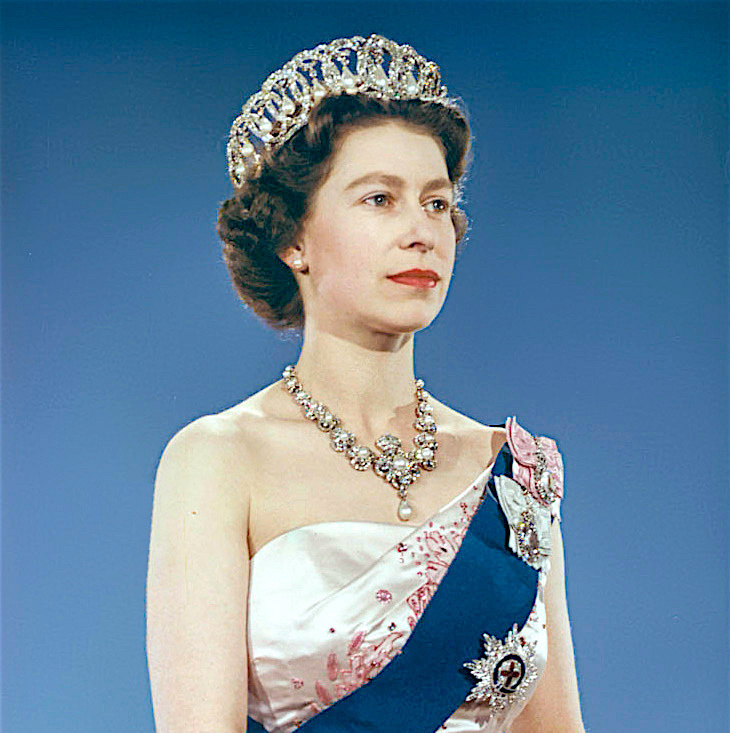
Elizabeth II

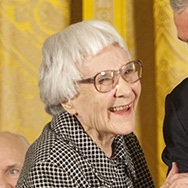
Harper Lee

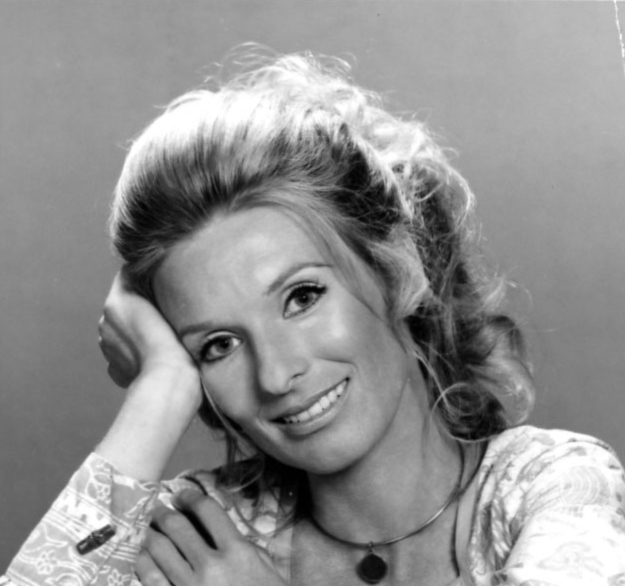
Cloris Leachman

- April 1
  - Charles Bressler, American tenor (d. 1996)
  - Anne McCaffrey, American-born Irish author (d. 2011)
- April 2
  - Jack Brabham, Australian racing driver (d. 2014)
  - Omar Graffigna, Argentine Air Force officer (d. 2019)
- April 3 – Gus Grissom, American astronaut (d. 1967)
- April 5
  - Roger Corman, American filmmaker, producer, actor and businessman (d. 2024)
  - Ri Kun-mo, North Korean politician (d. 2001)
- April 6
  - Jeanne Martin Cissé, Guinean teacher, nationalist politician (d. 2017)
  - Sergio Franchi, Italian tenor, actor (d. 1990)
  - Ian Paisley, Northern Irish politician (d. 2014)
  - Randy Weston, American jazz pianist and composer (d. 2018)
- April 8 – Jürgen Moltmann, German theologian and academic (d. 2024)
- April 9 – Hugh Hefner, American magazine editor (Playboy) (d. 2017)
- April 10 – Gustav Metzger, German-born stateless auto-destructive artist (d. 2017)
- April 12 – Jane Withers, American actress (d. 2021)
- April 13
  - John Spencer-Churchill, 11th Duke of Marlborough, British peer (d. 2014)
  - Egon Wolff, Chilean playwright, author (d. 2016)
- April 14
  - Frank Daniel, Czech-born writer, producer, director, and teacher (d. 1996)
  - Gloria Jean, American actress and singer (d. 2018)
  - George Robledo, Chilean soccer player (d. 1989)
  - Leopoldo Calvo-Sotelo, Spanish politician (d. 2008)
- April 15 – Jurriaan Schrofer, Dutch sculptor, designer, and educator (d. 1990)
- April 19 – Rawya Ateya, Egyptian politician, first female parliamentarian in the Arab world (d. 1997)
- April 20 – Christian Mohn, Norwegian ski jumper and sports official (d. 2019)
- April 21
  - Queen Elizabeth II of the United Kingdom (d. 2022)
  - Arthur Rowley, English footballer (d. 2002)
  - Alexander Lyudskanov, Bulgarian translator, semiotician and mathematician (d. 1976)
- April 22
  - Ted Hibberd, Canadian ice hockey player (d. 2017)
  - Charlotte Rae, American actress, singer (d. 2018)
  - James Stirling, Scottish architect (d. 1992)
- April 24 – Thorbjörn Fälldin, twice Prime Minister of Sweden (d. 2016)
- April 27
  - Tim LaHaye, American evangelist, speaker and author (d. 2016)
  - Vladimír Černý, Slovak modern pentathlete (d. 2016)
- April 28 – Harper Lee, American novelist (To Kill a Mockingbird) (d. 2016)
- April 29 – Paul Baran, American internet pioneer (d. 2011)
- April 30
  - Alda Neves da Graça do Espírito Santo, Santomean poet (d. 2010)
  - Cloris Leachman, American actress (d. 2021)

=== May ===
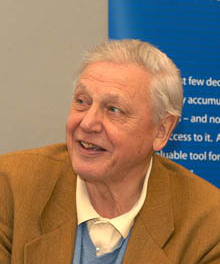
Sir David Attenborough

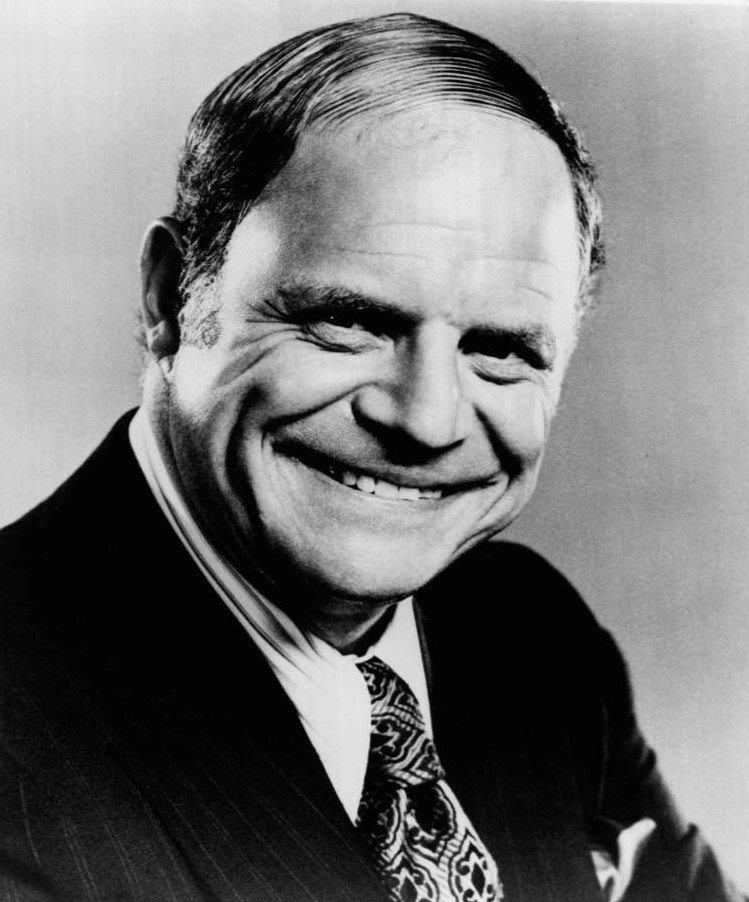
Don Rickles

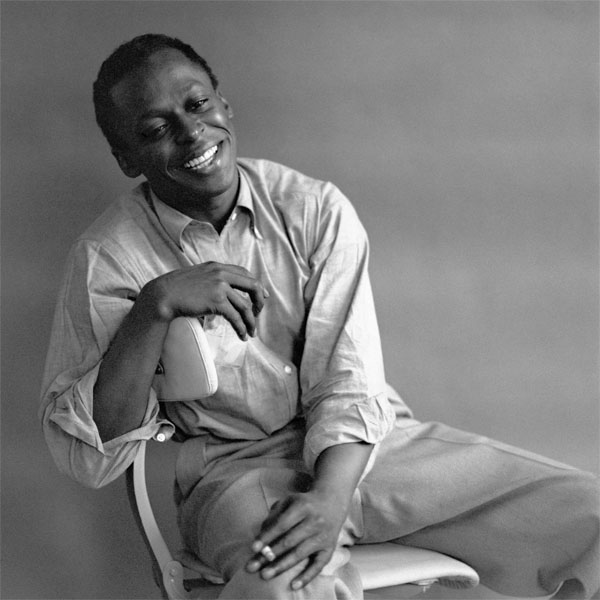
Miles Davis

- May 1 – Peter Lax, Hungarian-American mathematician, academic (d. 2025)
- May 3
  - Matt Baldwin, Canadian curler (d. 2023)
  - Ema Derossi-Bjelajac, Croatian politician (d. 2020)
  - Ann B. Davis, American actress (d. 2014)
- May 7 – Rebiha Khebtani, French Algerian politician (d. 2006)
- May 8
  - Sir David Attenborough, British broadcaster, naturalist, and producer
  - David Hurst, German actor (d. 2019)
  - Don Rickles, American stand-up comedian, actor (d. 2017)
- May 10 – Hugo Banzer, 51st President of Bolivia (d. 2002)
- May 14 – Eric Morecambe, English comedian, author (d. 1984)
- May 15
  - Anthony Shaffer, English novelist, playwright (d. 2001)
  - Sir Peter Shaffer, English playwright (d. 2016)
- May 17
  - Prince Dimitri Romanov, Russian prince, banker, philanthropist and author (d. 2016)
  - Franz Sondheimer, German-born British chemist (d. 1981)
  - Dietmar Schönherr, Austrian film actor (d. 2014)
- May 18 – Niranjan Bhagat, Indian poet (d. 2018)
- May 21 – Robert Creeley, American poet (d. 2005)
- May 23 – Aileen Hernandez, African-American union organizer, civil rights activist, and women's rights activist (d. 2017)
- May 24 – Stanley Baxter, Scottish actor and screenwriter (d. 2025)
- May 25
  - Claude Akins, American actor (d. 1994)
  - Bill Sharman, American basketball player, coach (d. 2013)
- May 26 – Miles Davis, African-American Jazz musician (d. 1991)
- May 27 – Rashidi Kawawa, 1st Prime Minister of Tanzania (d. 2009)
- May 29 – Abdoulaye Wade, 3rd President of Senegal
- May 30 - Christine Jorgensen, American trans woman and actress (d. 1989)

=== June ===
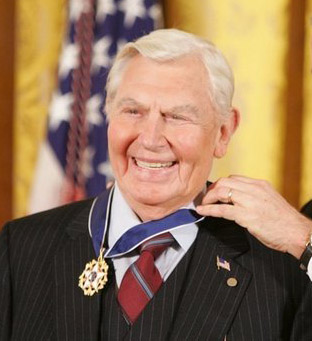
Andy Griffith

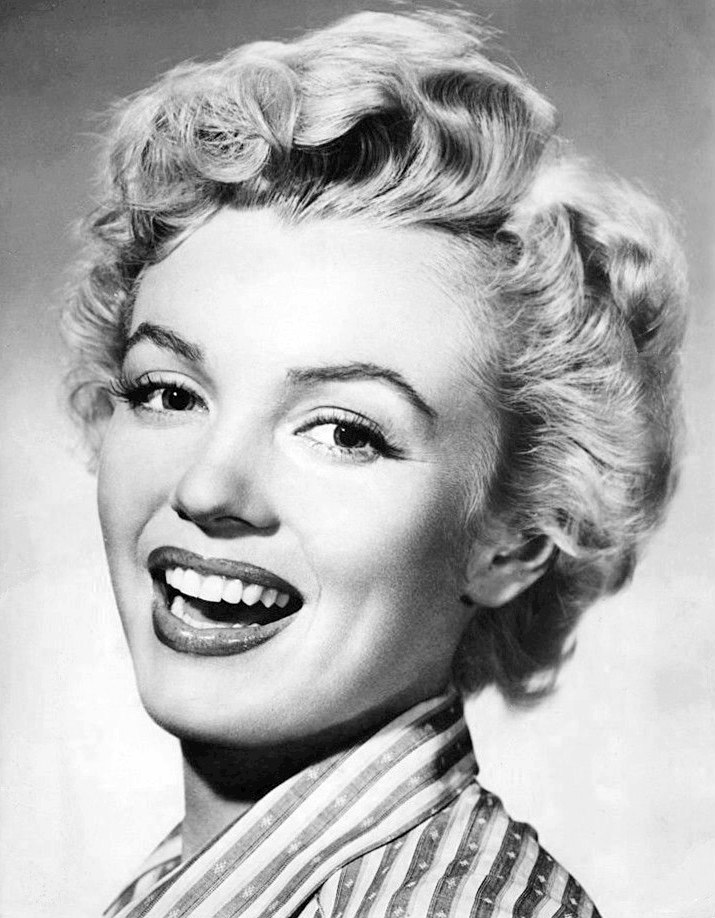
Marilyn Monroe

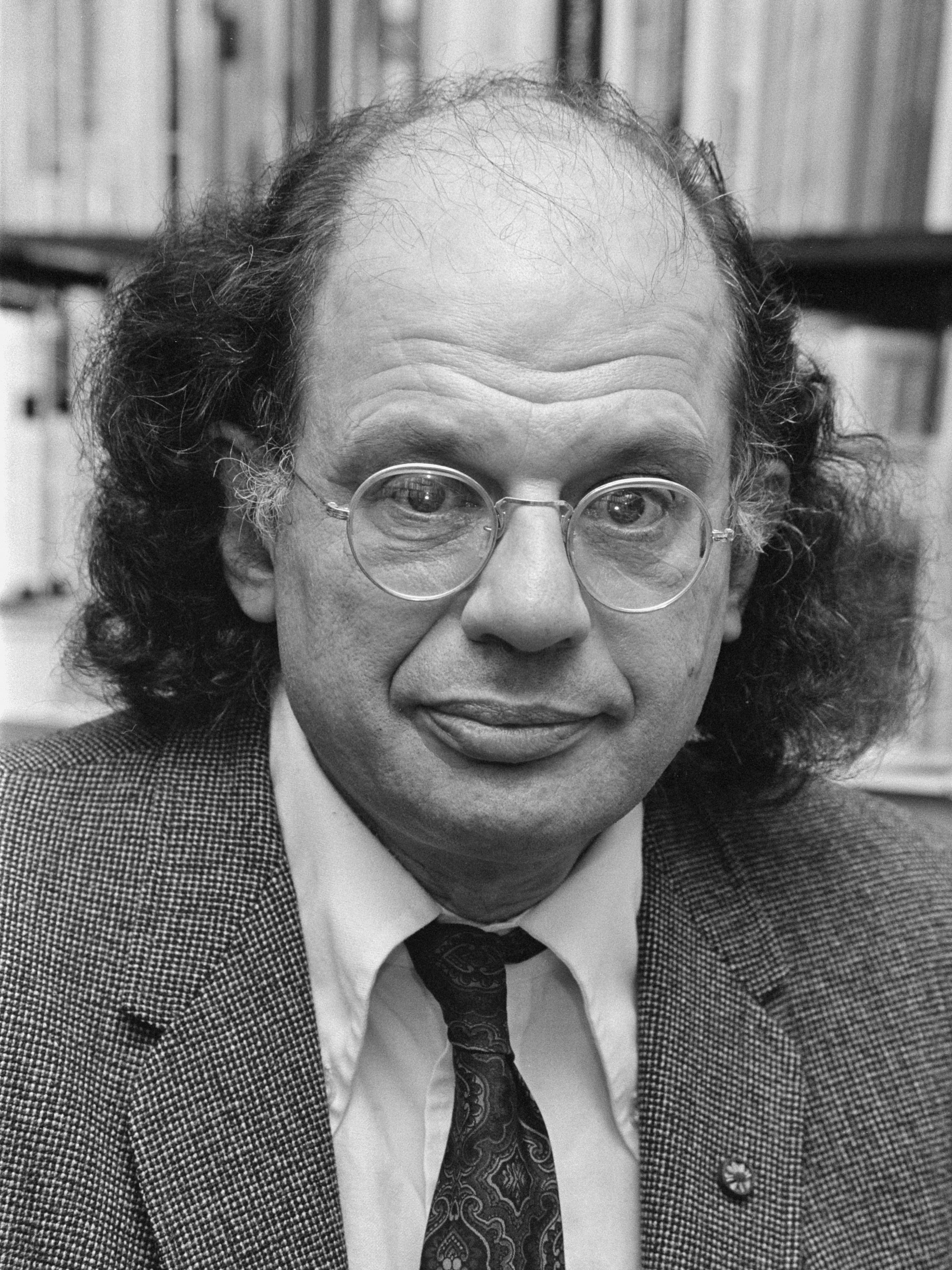
Allen Ginsberg

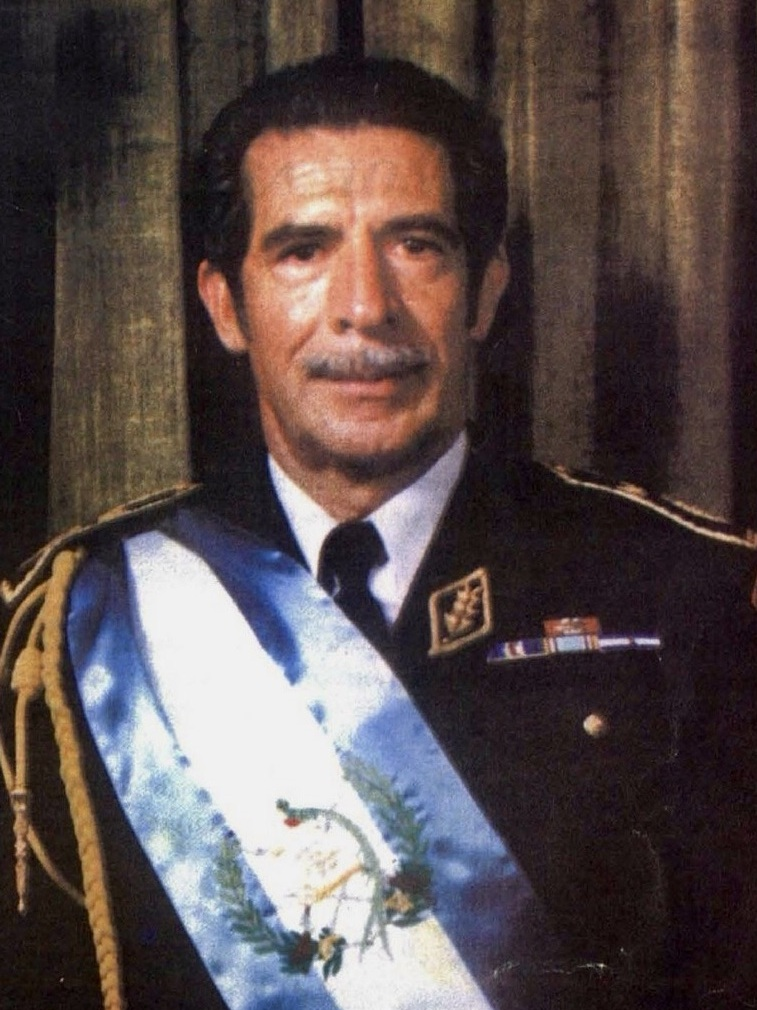
Efraín Ríos Montt

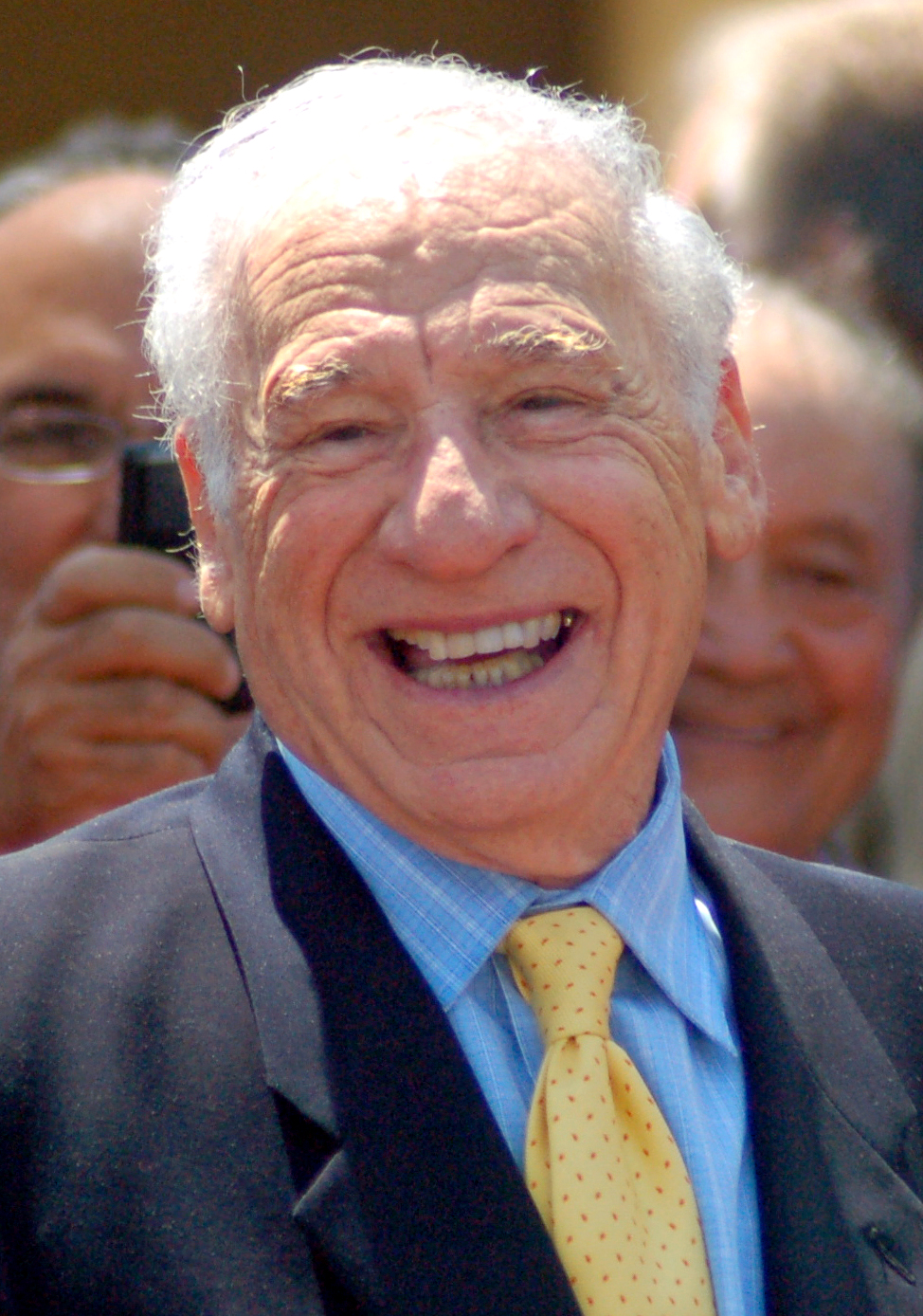
Mel Brooks

- June 1
  - Andy Griffith, American actor, comedian, singer (d. 2012)
  - Marilyn Monroe, American actress (d. 1962)
- June 3
  - Flora MacDonald, Canadian politician and humanitarian (d. 2015)
  - Allen Ginsberg, American poet (Howl) (d. 1997)
  - Molly Lazechko, American politician (d. 2010)
- June 4 – Robert Earl Hughes, American who was the heaviest human being recorded in the history of the world during his lifetime (d. 1958)
- June 5
  - Emile Capgras, Martinican politician (d. 2014)
  - Kerstin Gellerman, Swedish politician (d. 1987)
  - Paul Soros, Hungarian-born American mechanical engineer, inventor, businessman and philanthropist (d. 2013)
- June 6 – Antônio Ribeiro de Oliveira, Brazilian Roman Catholic prelate (d. 2017)
- June 7 – Jean-Noël Tremblay, Canadian politician (d. 2020)
- June 10
  - June Haver, American actress and singer (d. 2005)
  - Lionel Jeffries, British film director and actor (d. 2010)
- June 11
  - Carlisle Floyd, American composer and educator (d. 2021)
  - Frank Plicka, Czech-born photographer (d. 2010)
- June 12
  - Amadeo Carrizo, Argentine goalkeeper (d. 2020)
  - Gaspare di Mercurio, Italian doctor and author (d. 2001)
- June 13
  - Satoru Abe, Japanese-American sculptor and painter (d. 2025)
  - June Krauser, American swimmer (d. 2014)
- June 16 – Efraín Ríos Montt, Guatemalan career military officer and politician (d. 2018)
- June 18
  - Avshalom Haviv, member of the Irgun underground organization in Mandatory Palestine (d. 1947)
  - Allan Sandage, American astronomer (d. 2010)
- June 19 – Erna Schneider Hoover, American mathematician and inventor
- June 21
  - Mona Baptiste, Trinidad and Tobago singer and actress (d. 1993)
  - Washington Malianga, Zimbabwean politician (d. 2014)
  - Johanna Quandt, German businesswoman (d. 2015)
- June 22
  - George Englund, American film editor, director, producer, and actor (d. 2017)
  - Elyakim Haetzni, Israeli lawyer (d. 2022)
  - Tadeusz Konwicki, Polish filmmaker (d. 2015)
  - Rachid Solh, Prime Minister of Lebanon (d. 2014)
- June 23
  - Yoshihiro Hamaguchi, Japanese freestyle swimmer (d. 2011)
  - Annette Mbaye d'Erneville, Senegalese writer
  - Arnaldo Pomodoro, Italian sculptor (d. 2025)
- June 24
  - Muslim Arogundade, Nigerian sprinter (d. 1991)
  - Barbara Scofield, American tennis player (d. 2023)
- June 25
  - Ján Eugen Kočiš, Czech bishop (d. 2019)
  - Ingeborg Bachmann, Austrian writer (d. 1973)
  - Gordon Robertson, Canadian ice hockey player (d. 2019)
  - Stig Sollander, Swedish alpine skier (d. 2019)
- June 26
  - Raoul Abatchou, Central African politician and mining operator (d. 1968)
  - Mahendra Bhatnagar, Indian poet (d. 2020)
  - Fernando Mönckeberg Barros, Chilean surgeon
  - Luis Molné, Andorran alpine skier
  - André Monnier, French ski jumper (d. 2023)
  - Fritz Zwazl, Austrian swimmer
- June 27
  - Giambattista Bonis, Italian professional football player
  - Geza de Kaplany, Hungarian-born physician
  - Don Raleigh, American ice hockey player (d. 2012)
  - Bruce Tozer, Australian cricketer (d. 2021)
  - Galina Vecherkovskaya, Russian rower
- June 28
  - Elisabeta Abrudeanu, Romanian artistic gymnast
  - George Booth, American cartoonist (d. 2022)
  - Mel Brooks, American actor, comedian, and screenwriter
- June 30
  - Peter Alexander, Austrian actor and singer (d. 2011)
  - Paul Berg, American chemist, Nobel Prize laureate (d. 2023)
  - Božena Moserová, Czech alpine skier (d. 2017)

=== July ===
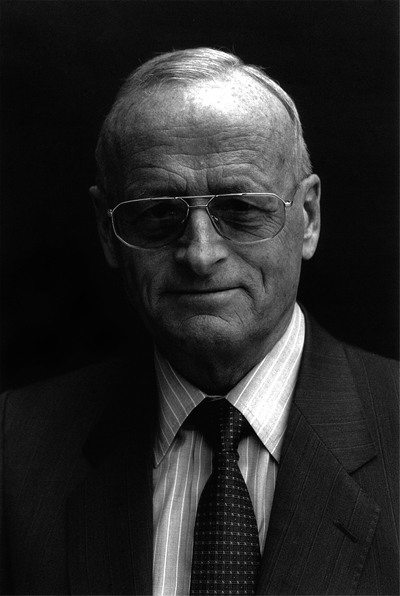
Carl Hahn

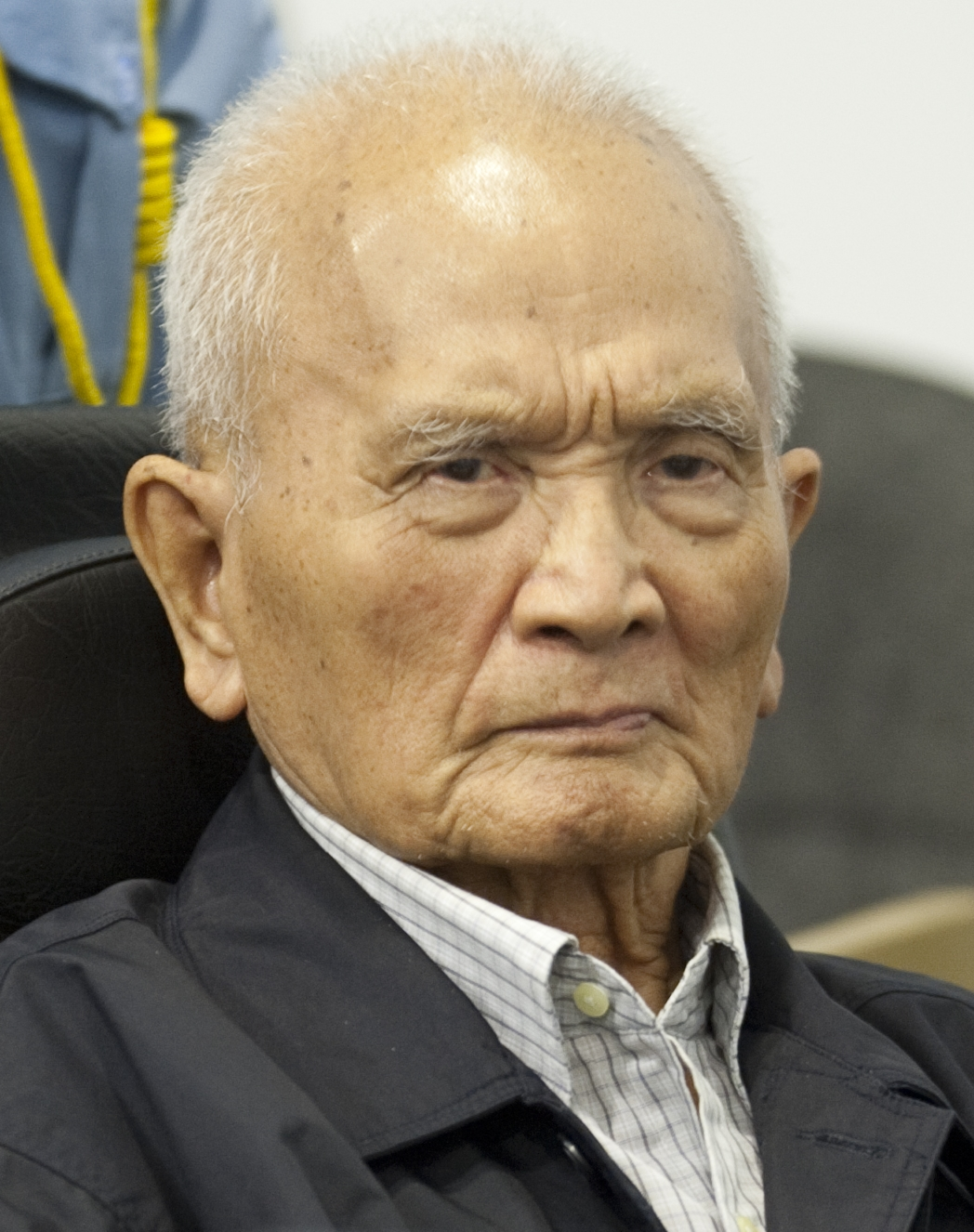
Nuon Chea

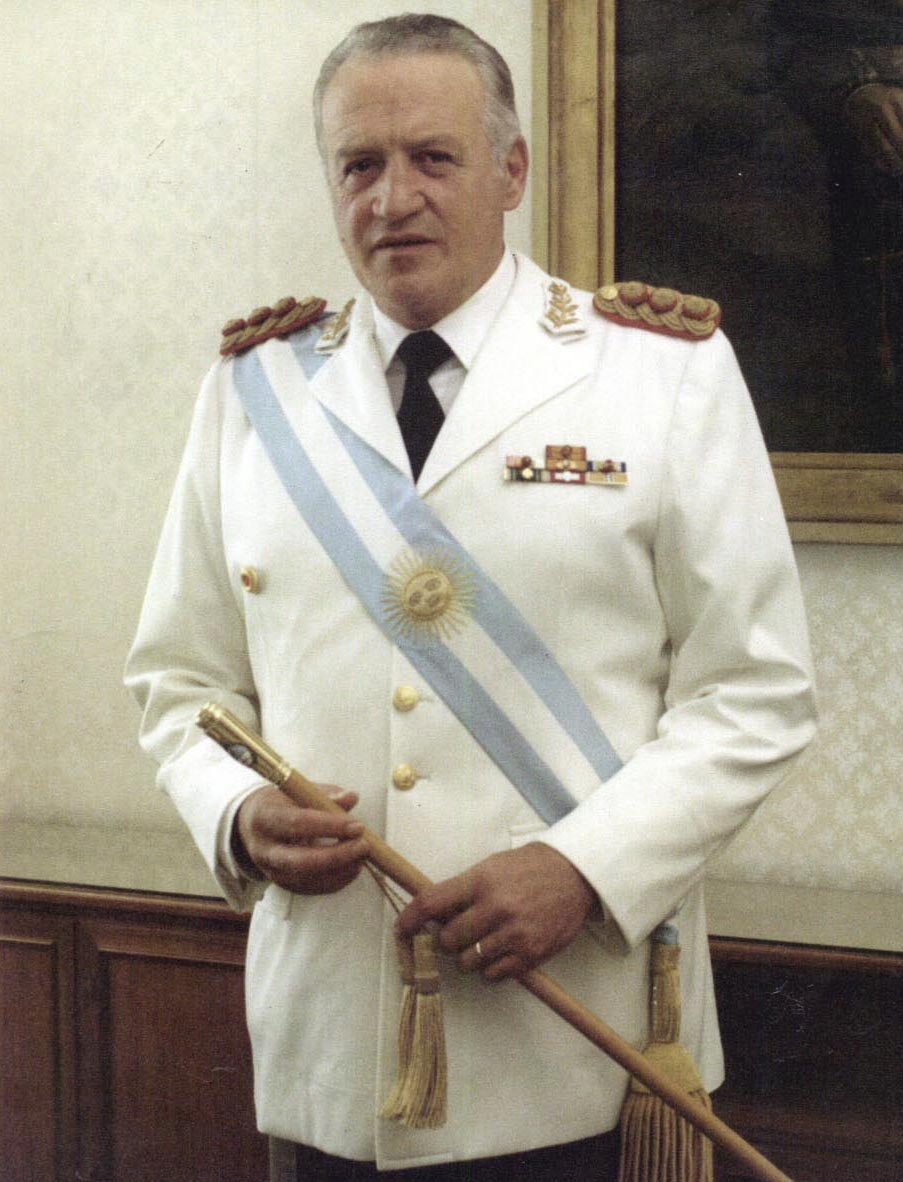
Leopoldo Galtieri

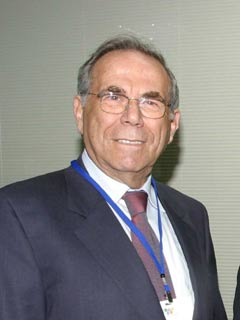
Stef Wertheimer

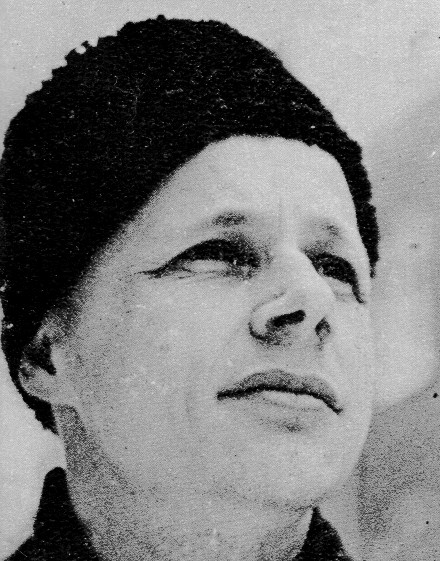
Maunu Kurkvaara

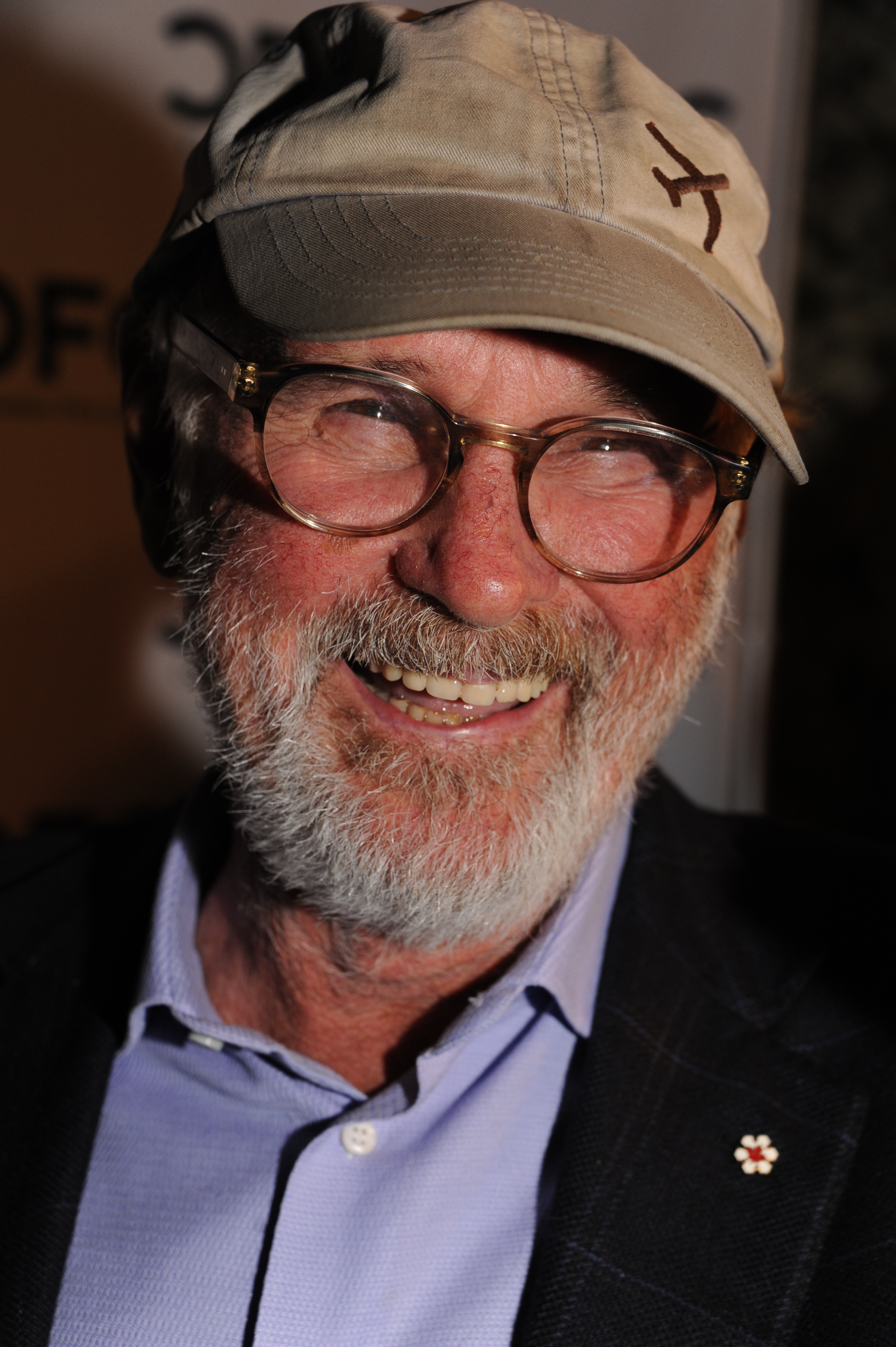
Norman Jewison

- July 1
  - Fernando J. Corbató, American computer scientist (d. 2019)
  - Robert Fogel, American economist, Nobel Prize laureate (d. 2013)
  - Carl Hahn, German automotive executive, chairman of Volkswagen (d. 2023)
  - Hans Werner Henze, German composer (d. 2012)
- July 2
  - Liu Dajun, Chinese agricultural scientist, educator and an academician (d. 2016)
  - Alfons Oehy, Swiss swimmer (d. 1977)
  - Carlo Rolandi, Italian sailor (d. 2020)
- July 3 – María Lorenza Barreneche, First Lady of Argentina (d. 2016)
- July 4
  - Alfredo Di Stéfano, Argentine-born footballer (d. 2014)
  - Amos Elon, Israeli writer (d. 2009)
- July 5
  - Salvador Jorge Blanco, President of the Dominican Republic (d. 2010)
  - Diana Lynn, American actress (d. 1971)
  - Anthony Purssell, English brewing executive and rower
  - Éliane Vogel-Polsky, Belgian lawyer and feminist (d. 2015)
- July 6
  - Serge Roullet, French film director and screenwriter (d. 2023)
  - Dorothy E. Smith, British-born Canadian sociologist (d. 2022)
- July 7
  - Armand Lemieux, Canadian ice hockey player (d. 2015)
  - Thorkild Simonsen, Danish politician (d. 2022)
  - Nuon Chea, Cambodian politician, 31st Prime Minister of Cambodia (d. 2019)
  - Mel Clark, American Major League Baseball outfielder (d. 2014)
- July 8
  - David Malet Armstrong, Australian philosopher (d. 2014)
  - Elisabeth Kübler-Ross, Swiss-American psychiatrist (d. 2004)
- July 9
  - Jens Juul Eriksen, Danish cyclist (d. 2004)
  - Mathilde Krim, founding chairman of amfAR, the American Foundation for AIDS Research (d. 2018)
  - Ben Roy Mottelson, American-born physicist, Nobel Prize laureate (d. 2022)
- July 10
  - Carleton Carpenter, American actor and dancer (d. 2022)
  - Donald Geary, American ice hockey player (d. 2015)
  - Fred Gwynne, American actor and author (d. 1993)
  - Harry MacPherson, American pitcher (d. 2017)
  - Aldo Tortorella, Italian journalist, politician and partisan (d. 2025)
- July 11
  - Frederick Buechner, American author and theologian (d. 2022)
  - Joe Houston, American saxophonist (d. 2015)
- July 12 – Siti Hasmah, spouse of Malaysian Prime Minister Mahathir Mohamad (d. 2026)
- July 13 – Cheng Chi-sen, Taiwanese sports shooter
- July 14 – Harry Dean Stanton, American film and television actor (d. 2017)
- July 15
  - Sir John Graham, 4th Baronet, English diplomat (d. 2019)
  - Leopoldo Galtieri, Argentine dictator (d. 2003)
  - Raymond Gosling, English physicist (d. 2015)
- July 16
  - Emile Degelin, Belgian film director and novelist (d. 2017)
  - Michael Otedola, Nigerian politician (d. 2014)
  - Irwin Rose, American biologist, recipient of the Nobel Prize in Chemistry (d. 2015)
  - Stef Wertheimer, German-born Israeli industrialist, investor, philanthropist and former politician (d. 2025)
- July 17 – Édouard Carpentier, Canadian professional wrestler (d. 2010)
- July 18
  - Maunu Kurkvaara, Finnish film director and screenwriter (d. 2023)
  - Bernard Pons, French politician and medical doctor (d. 2022)
- July 19
  - Terry Cavanagh, Canadian politician (d. 2017)
  - Helen Gallagher, American actress, dancer, and singer (d. 2024)
- July 20
  - Charles David Ganao, Congolese politician (d. 2012)
  - Odd Kallerud, Norwegian politician (d. 2016)
- July 21
  - Otto Beyeler, Swiss cross country skier (d. 2004)
  - Norman Jewison, Canadian film director (d. 2024)
- July 22 – Bryan Forbes, English film director (d. 2013)
- July 24 – Hans Günter Winkler, German show jumping rider (d. 2018)
- July 25
  - Yvonne Ciannella, American coloratura soprano in opera and concert (d. 2022)
  - Beatriz Segall, Brazilian actress (d. 2018)
  - Ray Solomonoff, American inventor (d. 2009)
- July 26 – James Best, American actor and acting coach (d. 2015)
- July 28 – Walt Brown, American presidential candidate
- July 29 – Franco Sensi, Italian businessman (d. 2008)
- July 30
  - Nina Kulagina, Russian psychic (d. 1990)
  - George Shanard, American politician and businessman (d. 2012)
- July 31
  - Bernard Nathanson, American medical doctor and activist (d. 2011)
  - Hilary Putnam, American philosopher, mathematician and computer scientist (d. 2016)

=== August ===
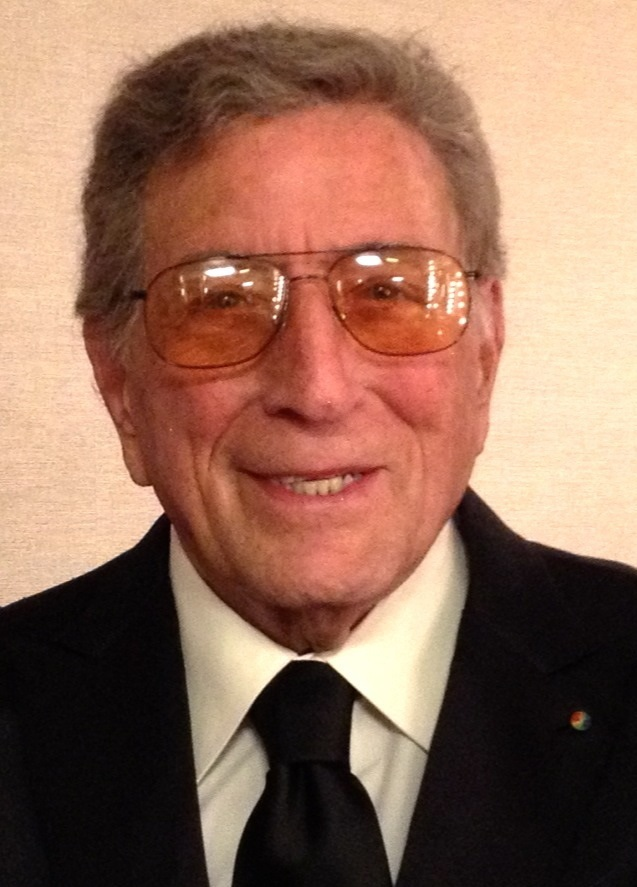
Tony Bennett

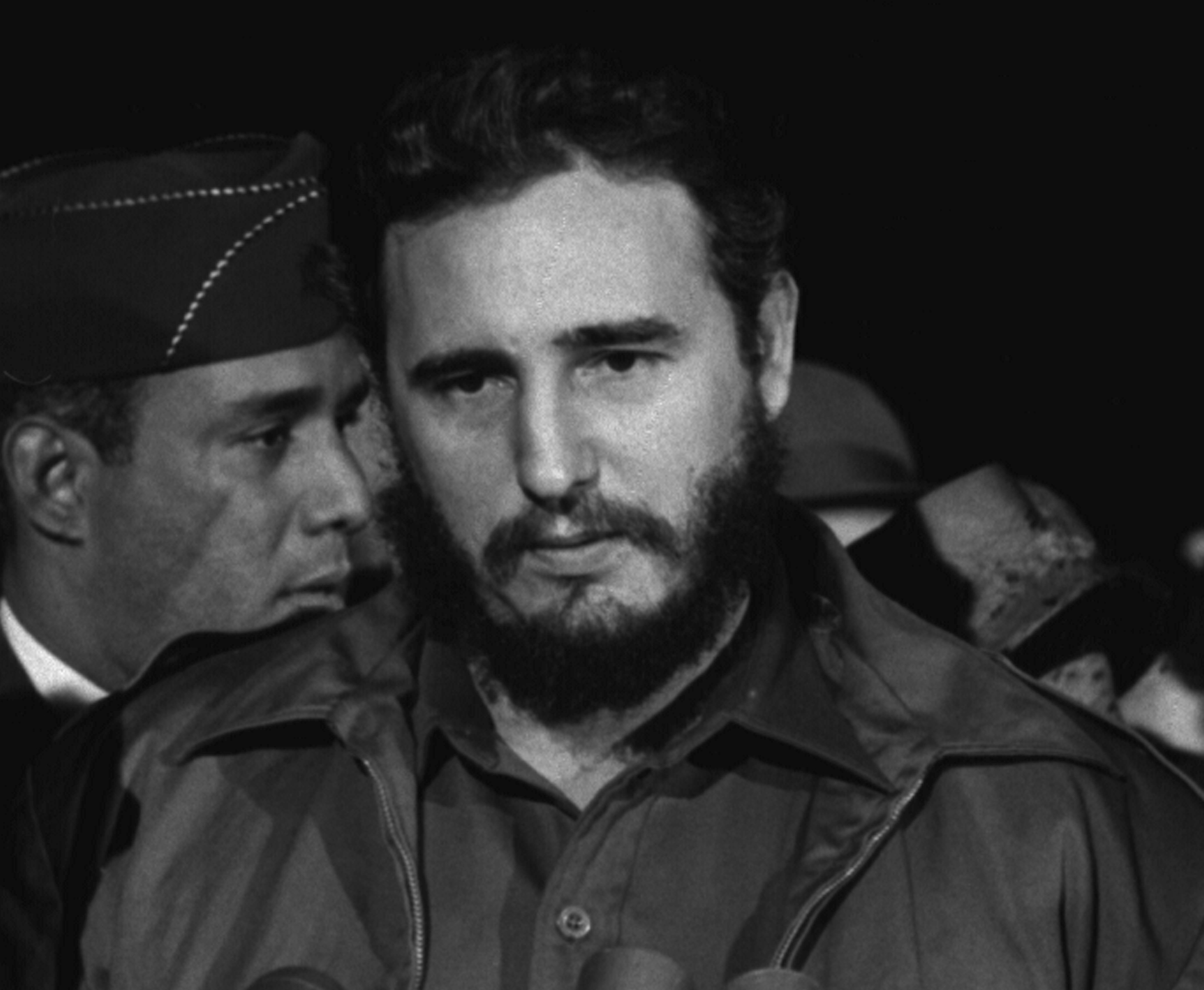
Fidel Castro

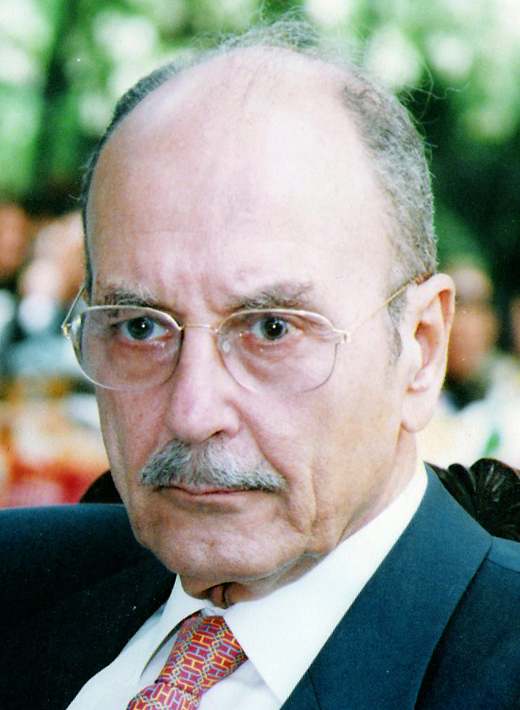
Konstantinos Stephanopoulos

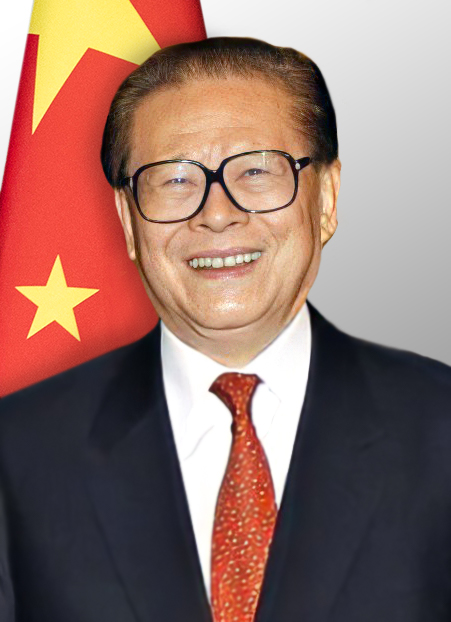
Jiang Zemin

- August 1 – George Habash, Palestinian Christian politician (d. 2008)
- August 2
  - Sy Mah, Canadian marathoner (d. 1988)
  - Igor Spassky, Russian scientist, engineer and businessman (d. 2024)
  - Hang Thun Hak, Cambodian radical politician, academic and playwright (d. 1975)
- August 3
  - Rona Anderson, Scottish stage, film, and television actress (d. 2013)
  - Loris Campana, Italian road and track cyclist (d. 2015)
  - Tony Bennett, American singer (d. 2023)
  - Shun-ichi Iwasaki, Japanese engineer (d. 2025)
- August 5 – Clifford Husbands, 6th Governor-General of Barbados (d. 2017)
- August 6
  - Janet Asimov, American writer and psychiatrist (d. 2019)
  - Angelo Bonfietti, Brazilian basketball player (d. 2004)
  - János Rózsás, Hungarian writer (d. 2012)
  - Frank Finlay, English stage, film and television actor (d. 2016)
  - Elisabeth Beresford, British author (d. 2010)
- August 7 – Stan Freberg, American author, recording artist and comedian (d. 2015)
- August 8
  - Silvio Amadio, Italian film director and screenwriter (d. 1995)
  - Jimmy Brown, American trumpeter, saxophonist and singer (d. 2006)
- August 9 – Frank M. Robinson, American science fiction and techno-thriller writer (d. 2014)
- August 10
  - Marie-Claire Alain, French organist (d. 2013)
  - Carol Ruth Vander Velde, American mathematician (d. 1972)
  - Arthur Maxwell House, Canadian neurologist (d. 2013)
- August 11
  - Ron Bontemps, American basketball player (d. 2017)
  - Aaron Klug, Lithuanian-English chemist, Nobel Prize laureate (d. 2018)
  - Claus von Bülow, Danish-British socialite (d. 2019)
  - John Gokongwei, Filipino billionaire businessman and philanthropist (d. 2019)
- August 12
  - John Derek, American actor and film director (d. 1998)
  - Hiroshi Koizumi, Japanese actor (d. 2015)
  - René Vignal, French footballer (d. 2016)
- August 13
  - Fidel Castro, Cuban revolutionary and politician (d. 2016)
  - Valentina Levko, Russian opera and chamber singer (d. 2018)
  - Norris Bowden, Canadian figure skater (d. 1991)
- August 14
  - Martin Broszat, German historian (d. 1989)
  - René Goscinny, French comic book writer (d. 1977)
  - Buddy Greco, American jazz and pop singer and pianist (d. 2017)
- August 15
  - Sukanta Bhattacharya, Bengali poet and playwright (d. 1947)
  - Ivy Bottini, American activist and artist (d. 2021)
  - Julius Katchen, American concert pianist (d. 1969)
  - Sami Michael, Iraqi-Israeli author (d. 2024)
  - Konstantinos Stephanopoulos, former President of Greece (d. 2016)
- August 16
  - Jack Britto, Pakistani Olympic field hockey player (d. 2013)
  - Eivind Hjelmtveit, Norwegian cultural administrator (d. 2017)
  - Yu Min, Chinese nuclear physicist (d. 2019)
  - Norman Wexler, American screenwriter (d. 1999)
- August 17
  - Jean Poiret, French actor, director, and screenwriter (d. 1992)
  - Jiang Zemin, former General Secretary of the Chinese Communist Party (paramount leader) and President of China (d. 2022)
- August 18 – Orlando Bosch, Cuban terrorist (d. 2011)
- August 19 – Luis Bordón, Paraguayan musician and composer (d. 2006)
- August 20 – Hocine Aït Ahmed, Algerian politician (d. 2015)
- August 21
  - Marian Jaworski, Polish cardinal (d. 2020)
  - Kim Ja-rim, Korean playwright and essayist (d. 1994)
- August 22 – Werner Spitz, German-American forensic pathologist (d. 2024)
- August 23 – Clifford Geertz, American anthropologist (d. 2006)
- August 29
  - Helene Ahrweiler, Greek historian and academic (d. 2026)
  - Ramakrishna Hegde, Indian politician (d. 2004)
  - Betty Lynn, American actress (d. 2021)

=== September ===
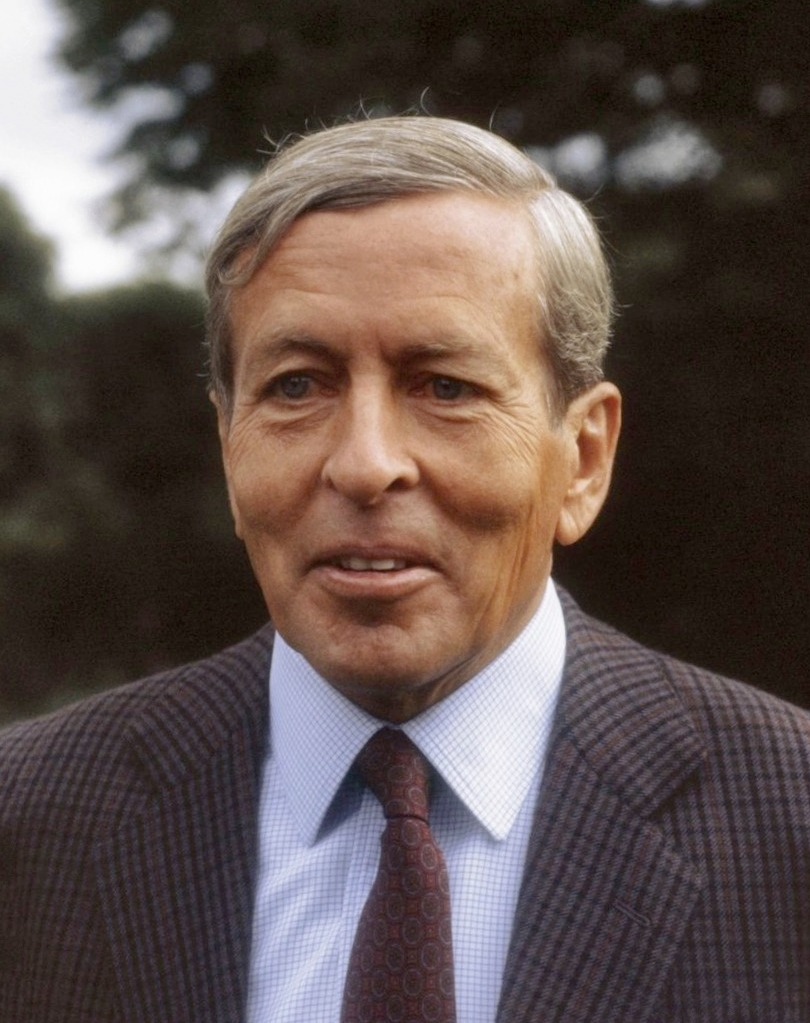
Prince Claus

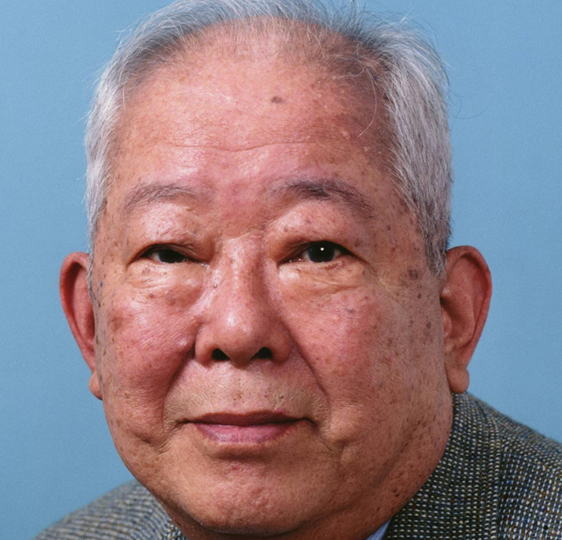
Masatoshi Koshiba

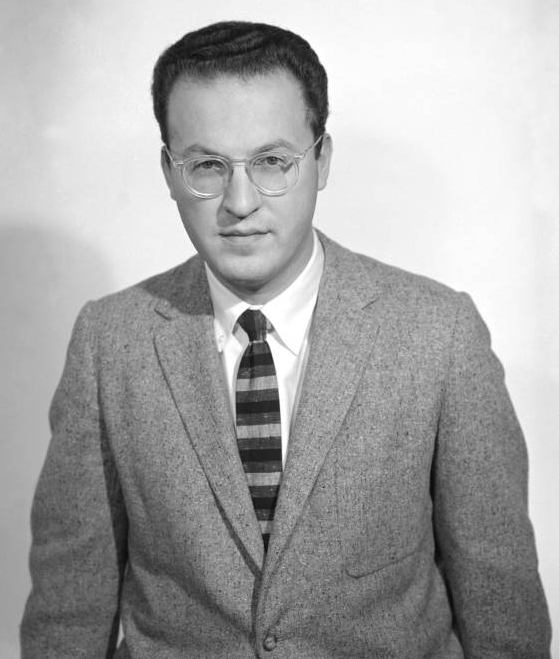
Donald A. Glaser

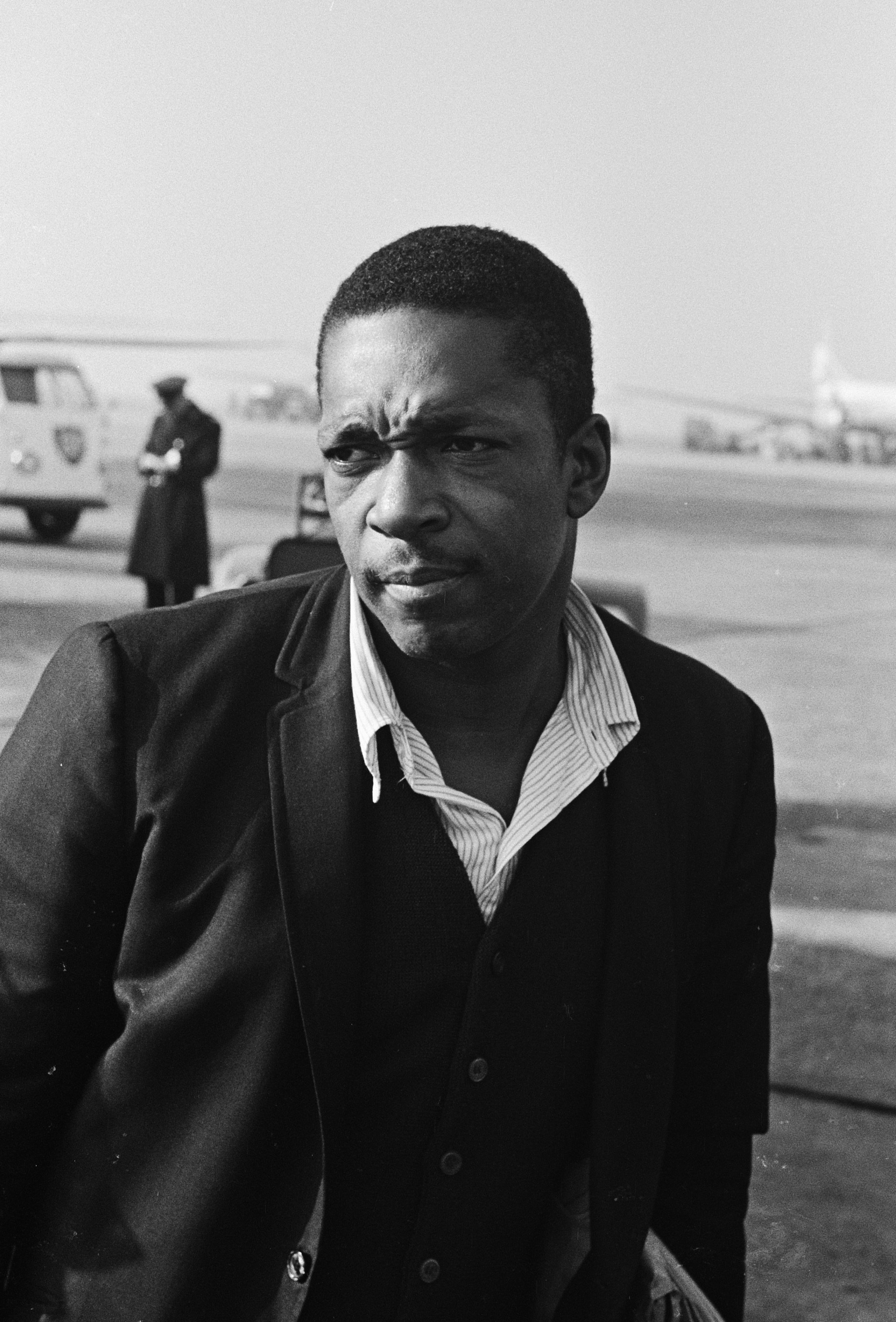
John Coltrane

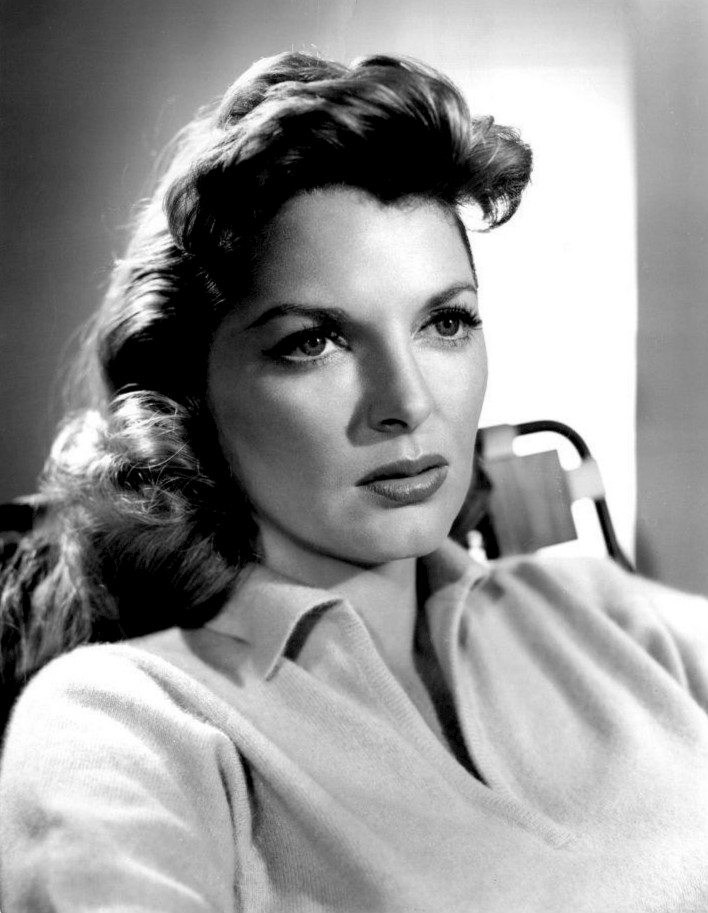
Julie London

- September 1
  - Stanley Cavell, American philosopher (d. 2018)
  - Abdur Rahman Biswas, 11th President of Bangladesh (d. 2017)
- September 2 – Ibrahim Nasir, Maldivian president (d. 2008)
- September 3
  - Uttam Kumar, Bengali actor (d. 1980)
  - Alison Lurie, American author and academic (d. 2020)
- September 4
  - Elias Hrawi, 14th President of Lebanon (d. 2006)
  - Ivan Illich, Austrian philosopher and Catholic priest who founded the Centro Intercultural de Documentación in Cuernavaca, Mexico (d. 2002)
- September 5
  - Mishaal bin Abdulaziz Al Saud, Saudi prince (d. 2017)
  - Carmen Petra Basacopol, Romanian composer, pianist and musicologist (d. 2023)
- September 6 – Claus van Amsberg, German born Prince Consort of the Netherlands (d. 2002)
- September 7 – Ivone Ramos, Cape Verdean writer (d. 2018)
- September 8 – Sergio Pininfarina, Italian automobile designer (d. 2012)
- September 9 – Yusuf al-Qaradawi, Egyptian Islamic theologian (d. 2022)
- September 11 – Gerrit Viljoen, South African government minister (d. 2009)
- September 13 – Emile Francis, Canadian ice hockey player and manager (d. 2022)
- September 14
  - Dick Dale, American singer and musician (d. 2014)
  - Carmen Franco, 1st Duchess of Franco, Spanish noble (d. 2017)
  - John F. Kurtzke, American neurologist (d. 2015)
- September 15 – Jean-Pierre Serre, French mathematician
- September 17
  - Bill Black, American rock and roll musician and bandleader (d. 1965)
  - Andrea Kékesy, Hungarian figure skater (d. 2024)
- September 19
  - Victoria Barbă, Moldovan animated film director (d. 2020)
  - Masatoshi Koshiba, Japanese physicist, Nobel Prize laureate (d. 2020)
  - James Lipton, American television personality and writer (d. 2020)
- September 21
  - Donald A. Glaser, American physicist, Nobel Prize laureate (d. 2013)
  - Noor Jehan, Pakistani singer and actress (d. 2000)
- September 23
  - Aage Birch, Danish competitive sailor and Olympic medalist (d. 2017)
  - John Coltrane, American jazz saxophonist (d. 1967)
  - Heng Freylinger, Luxembourgish wrestler (d. 2017)
- September 25 – John Ericson, German-American actor (d. 2020)
- September 26
  - Tulsi Giri, former Prime Minister of Nepal (d. 2018)
  - Julie London, American actress and singer (d. 2000)
- September 28
  - Bonnie Leman, American art historian, writer, and publisher of Quilter's Newsletter Magazine (d. 2010)
  - Ozzie Van Brabant, Canadian baseball player (d. 2018)
- September 30 – Frank O'Neill, Australian swimmer (d. 2024)

=== October ===
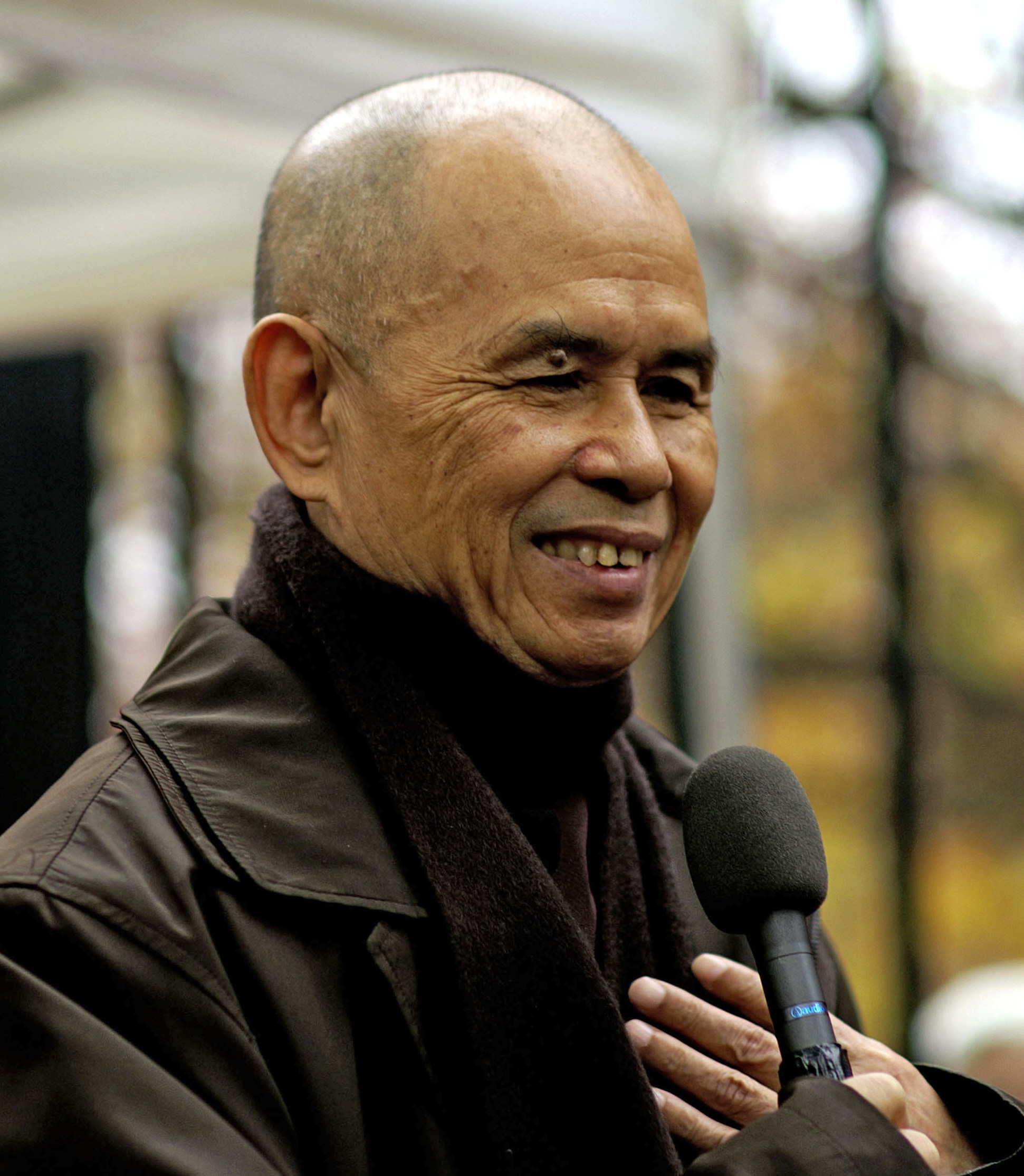
Thích Nhất Hạnh

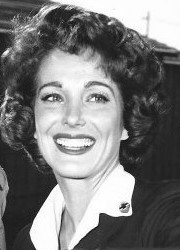
Julie Adams

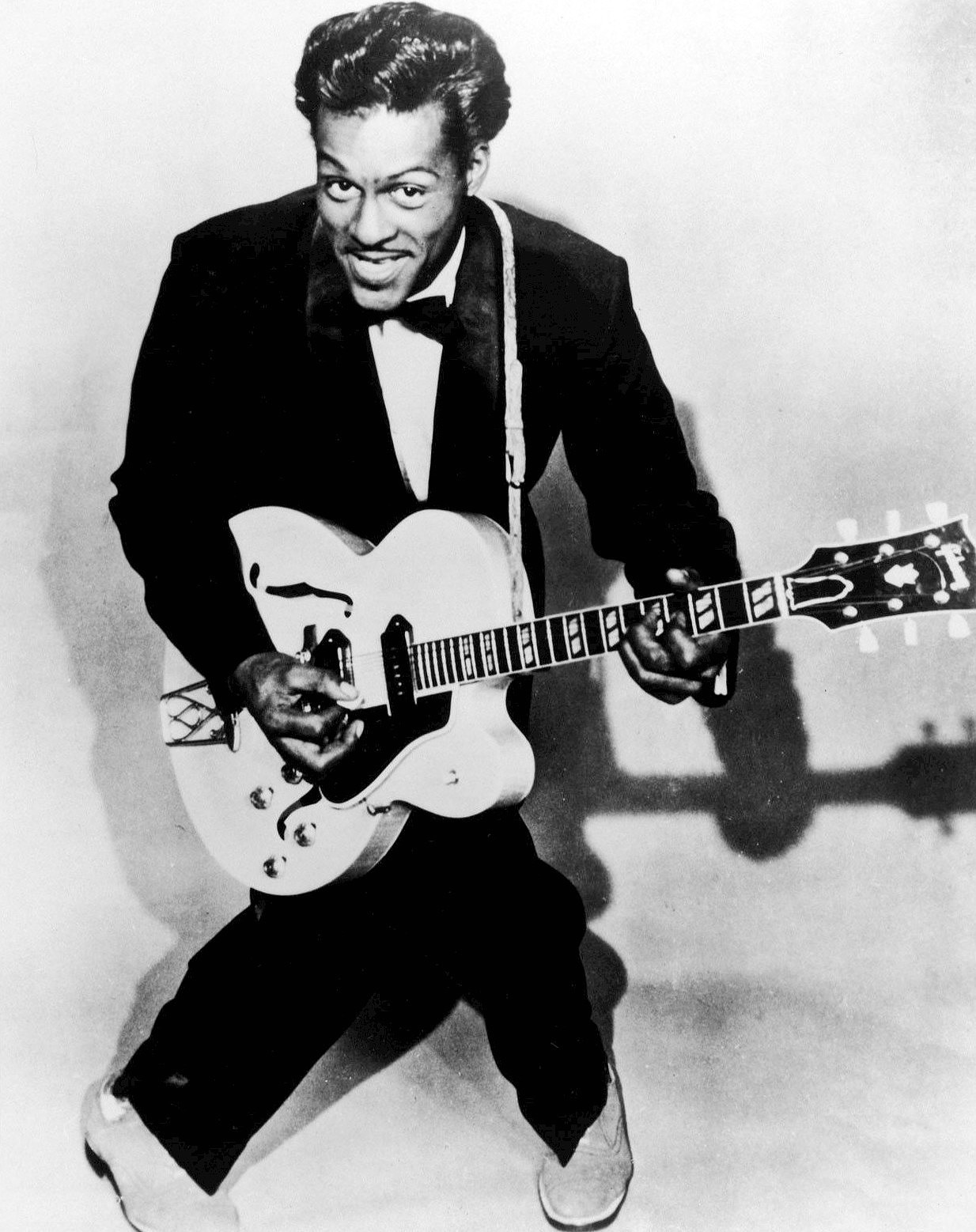
Chuck Berry

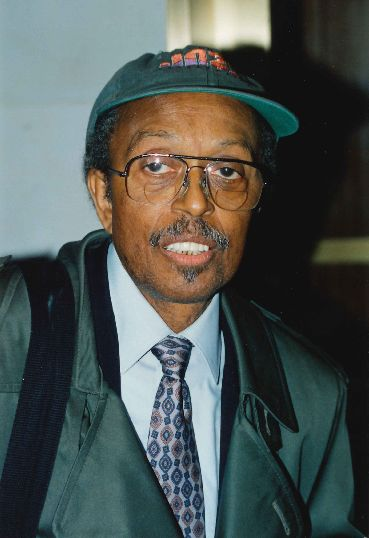
Jimmy Heath

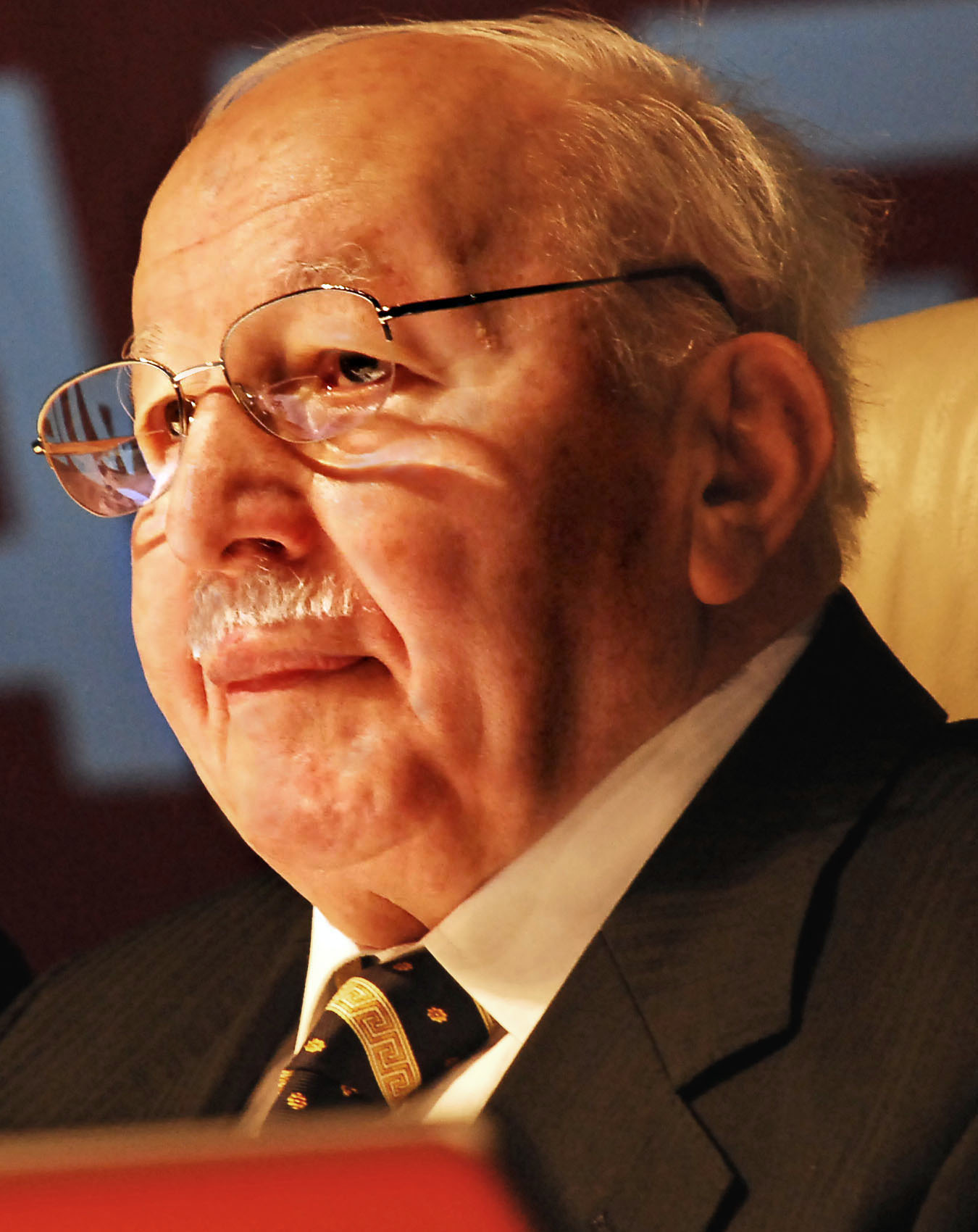
Necmettin Erbakan

- October 2
  - Jan Morris, born James Morris, British travel writer (d. 2020)
  - John Ross, Austrian-born American chemist (d. 2017)
- October 4 – Phar Lap, New Zealand-foaled racehorse (d. 1932)
- October 7
  - Czesław Ryll-Nardzewski, Polish mathematician (d. 2015)
  - Opal Lee, American activist
- October 8 – Carmencita Lara, Peruvian singer (d. 2018)
- October 9 – Ruth Ellis, British murderess (d. 1955)
- October 11
  - Thích Nhất Hạnh, Vietnamese Thiền Buddhist monk and peace activist (d. 2022)
  - Zohurul Hoque, Indian Islamic scholar (d. 2017)
  - Shin Sang-ok, South Korean film producer and director (d. 2006)
- October 12 – César Pelli, Argentine-American architect (d. 2019)
- October 13
  - Jesse L. Brown, first African-American aviator in the United States Navy (d. 1950)
  - Kazuo Nakamura, Japanese-Canadian painter, part of the Painters Eleven (d. 2002)
- October 15
  - Michel Foucault, French philosopher (d. 1984)
  - Jean Peters, American actress (d. 2000)
  - Karl Richter, German conductor (d. 1981)
- October 16 – Charles Dolan, American billionaire (d. 2024)
- October 17
  - Julie Adams, American actress (d. 2019)
  - Beverly Garland, American actress and businesswoman (d. 2008)
- October 18
  - Chuck Berry, American singer-songwriter and guitarist (d. 2017)
  - Klaus Kinski, German actor (d. 1991)
  - John Morris, American composer (d. 2018)
- October 19 – Marjorie Tallchief, American ballerina (d. 2021)
- October 20 – Vsevolod Murakhovsky, Ukrainian-Russian politician (d. 2017)
- October 22 – Chan Sui-kau, Hong Kong industrialist and philanthropist (d. 2018)
- October 25
  - María Concepción César, Argentine actress, singer and vedette (d. 2018)
  - Jimmy Heath, American jazz saxophonist and composer (d. 2020)
  - Galina Vishnevskaya, Russian soprano (d. 2012)
- October 27 – Henri Fertet, French Resistance fighter (d. 1943)
- October 28 – Bowie Kuhn, American Commissioner of Baseball (d. 2007)
- October 29
  - Necmettin Erbakan, 25th Prime Minister of Turkey (d. 2011)
  - Jon Vickers, Canadian operatic tenor (d. 2015)
- October 30 – Richard Hu – Singaporean politician, Minister for Finance (d. 2023)
- October 31 – Jimmy Savile, English media personality and registered sex offender (d. 2011)

=== November ===
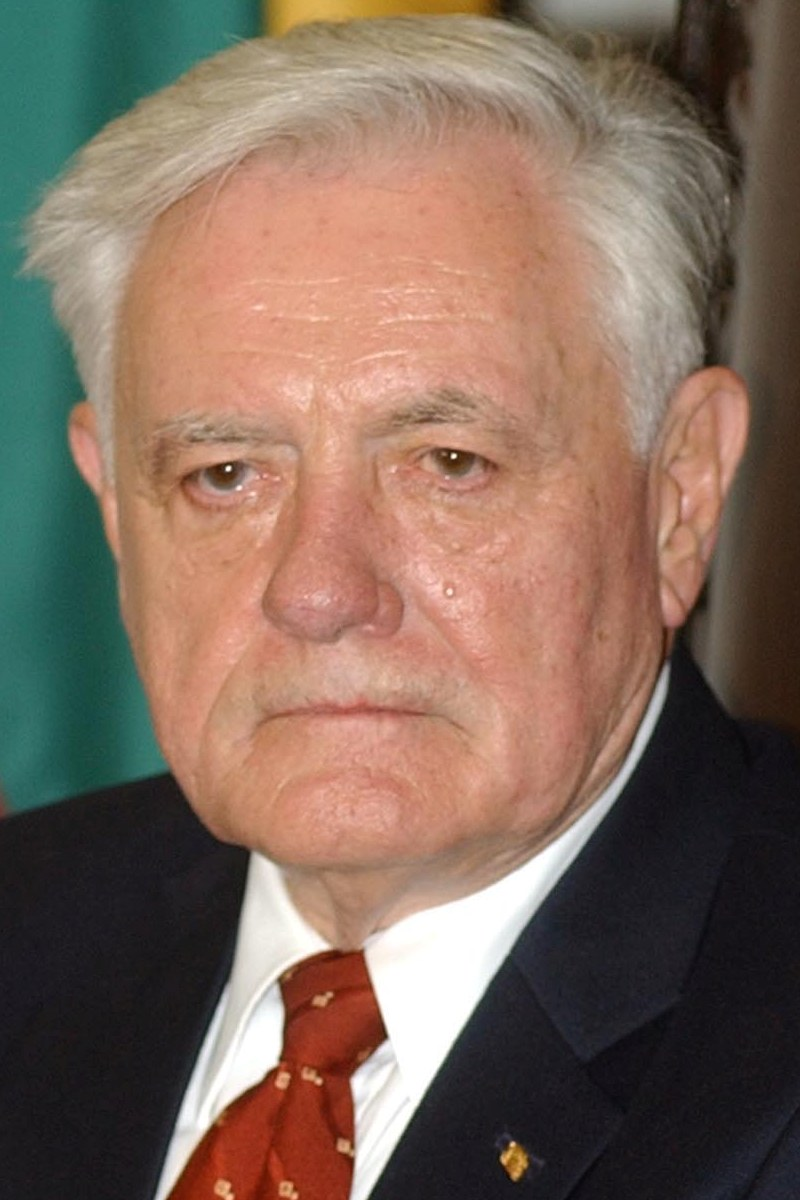
Valdas Adamkus

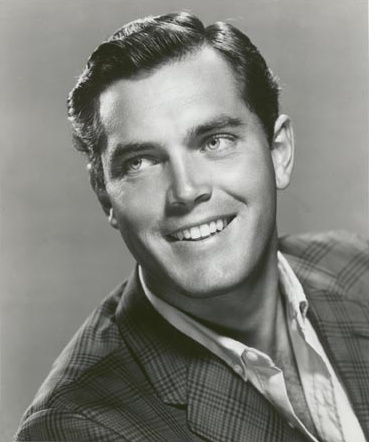
Jeffrey Hunter

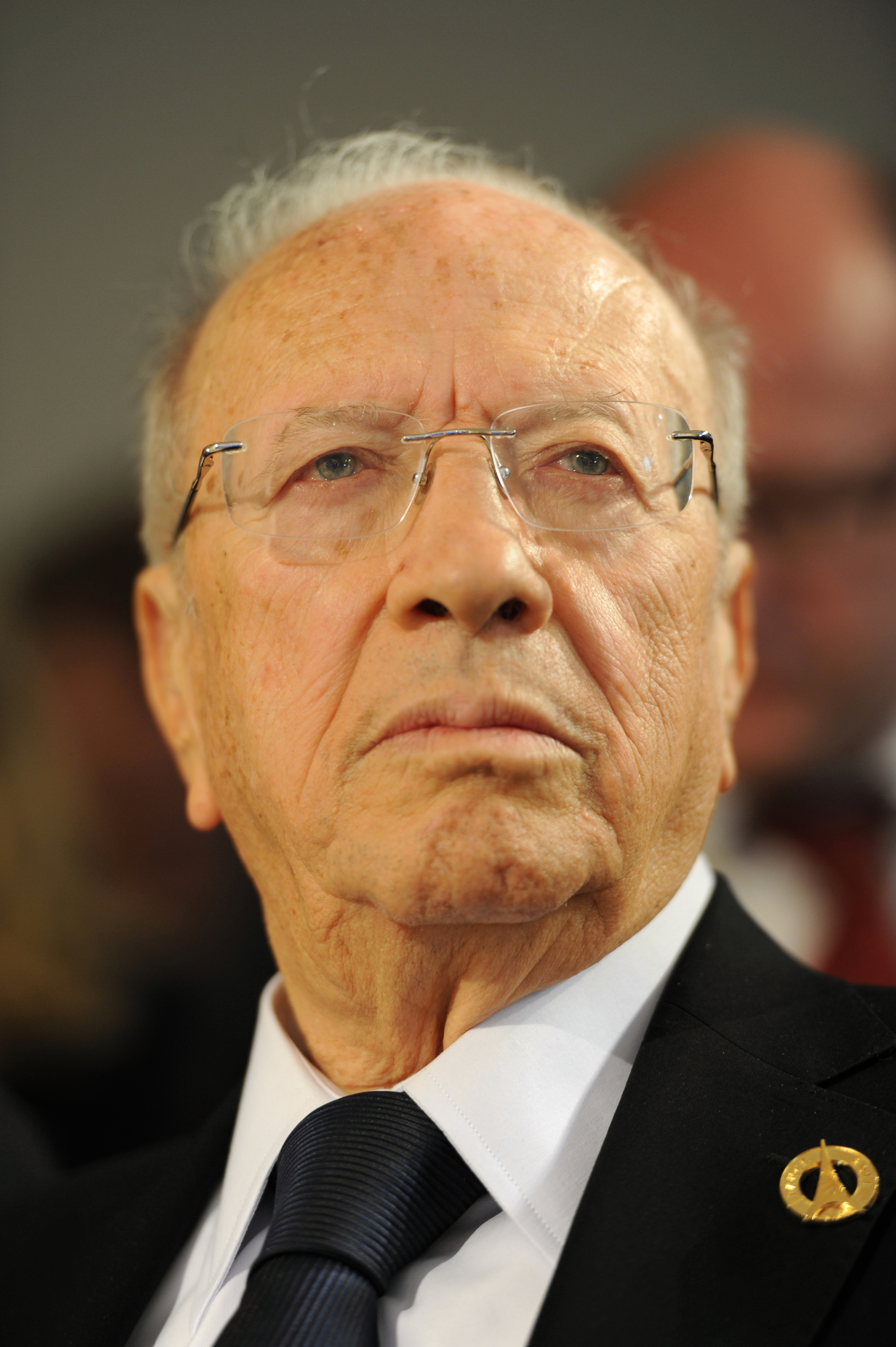
Beji Caid Essebsi

- November 1 – Betsy Palmer, American actress (d. 2015)
- November 2
  - Myer Skoog, American basketball player (d. 2019)
  - Charlie Walker, American country music singer-songwriter (d. 2008)
- November 3 – Valdas Adamkus, Lithuanian politician, 3rd President of Lithuania
- November 4 – Laurence Rosenthal, American composer
- November 5
  - John Berger, English art critic, novelist and painter (d. 2017)
  - Kim Jong-gil, South Korean poet (d. 2017)
- November 7 – Dame Joan Sutherland, Australian soprano (d. 2010)
- November 8
  - Sonja Bata, Swiss businesswoman and philanthropist (d. 2018)
  - Darleane C. Hoffman, American nuclear chemist (d. 2025)
  - Jack Mendelsohn, American writer-artist (d. 2017)
- November 9 – Stu Griffing, American Olympic rower (d. 2021)
- November 11
  - Maria Teresa de Filippis, Italian automobile racing driver (d. 2016)
  - Juan Jesús Posadas Ocampo, Mexican Roman Catholic cardinal (d. 1993)
  - José Manuel Caballero, Spanish poet and novelist (d. 2021)
- November 15 – Helmut Fischer, German actor (d. 1997)
- November 16 – Ton de Leeuw, Dutch composer (d. 1996)
- November 17 – Christopher Weeramantry, Sri Lankan lawyer (d. 2017)
- November 19 – Jeane Kirkpatrick, American ambassador (d. 2006)
- November 20
  - Choi Eun-hee, South Korean actress (d. 2018)
  - Judith Magre, French actress
- November 23
  - Sathya Sai Baba, Indian spiritual leader (d. 2011)
  - Vann Molyvann, Cambodian architect (d. 2017)
- November 24 – Tsung-Dao Lee, Chinese physicist, Nobel Prize laureate (d. 2024)
- November 25
  - Jeffrey Hunter, American actor (d. 1969)
  - Poul Anderson, American science fiction author (d. 2001)
- November 28 – Umberto Veronesi, Italian oncologist and politician (d. 2016)
- November 29 – Beji Caid Essebsi, Tunisian politician, 5th President and 18th Prime Minister of Tunisia (d. 2019)
- November 30
  - Richard Crenna, American actor (d. 2003)
  - Teresa Gisbert Carbonell, Bolivian architect and art historian (d. 2018)
  - Andrew Schally, Polish-born American endocrinologist, recipient of the Nobel Prize in Physiology or Medicine (d. 2024)

=== December ===
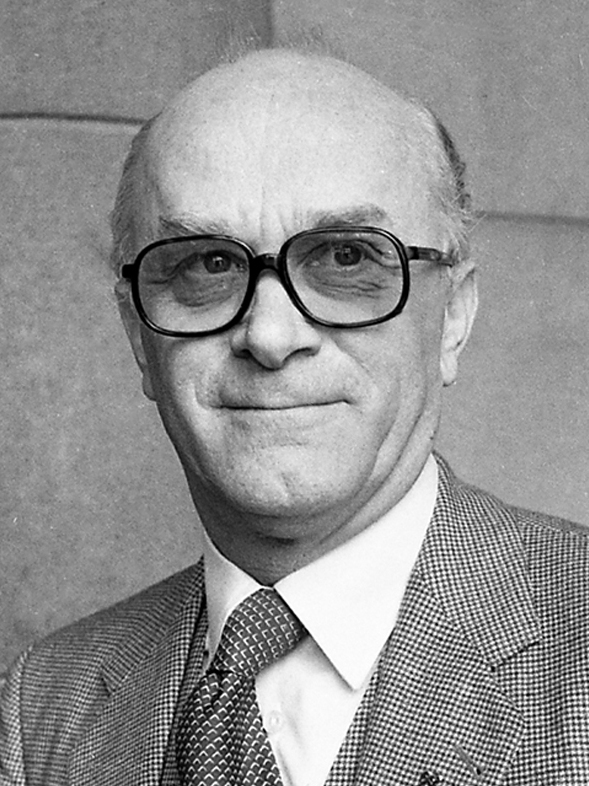
Raif Dizdarević

- December 1
  - Allyn Ann McLerie, Canadian-American actress and dancer (d. 2018)
  - Kitty Hart-Moxon, Polish-English nurse and Holocaust survivor
  - Antonio Lamela, Spanish architect (d. 2017)
- December 5 – Adetoun Ogunsheye, Nigerian academic and educator
- December 9
  - Raif Dizdarević, Bosnian politician (d. 2026)
  - Henry Way Kendall, American physicist, Nobel Prize laureate (d. 1999)
  - Lorenzo Wright, American athlete (d. 1972)
- December 10
  - Guitar Slim, American New Orleans blues guitarist (d. 1959)
  - Giorgos Ioannou, Greek artist (d. 2017)
- December 13 – George Rhoden, Jamaican athlete (d. 2024)
- December 14 – María Elena Marqués, Mexican actress (d. 2008)
- December 15
  - Nikos Koundouros, Greek film director (d. 2017)
  - Emmanuel Wamala, Ugandan cardinal
- December 16 – A. N. R. Robinson, 3rd President and 3rd Prime Minister of Trinidad and Tobago (d. 2014)
- December 17
  - Patrice Wymore, American actress (d. 2014)
  - Mahmud Ali al-Banna, Egyptian Quran reciter (d. 1985)
- December 20
  - Geoffrey Howe, British politician (d. 2015)
  - Otto Graf Lambsdorff, German politician (d. 2009)
  - David Levine, American caricaturist (d. 2009)
- December 21 – Joe Paterno, American football player and coach (d. 2012)
- December 22 – Alcides Ghiggia, Uruguayan footballer (d. 2015)
- December 23
  - Jorge Medina, Chilean cardinal (d. 2021)
  - Metakse, Armenian poet, writer, translator and public activist (d. 2014)
- December 24 – Maria Janion, Polish scholar, critic and politician (d. 2020)
- December 26 – Gina Pellón, Cuban painter (d. 2014)
- December 29 – Amelita Ramos, First Lady of the Philippines
- December 31 – Billy Snedden, Australian politician (d. 1987)

== Deaths ==
=== January–March ===
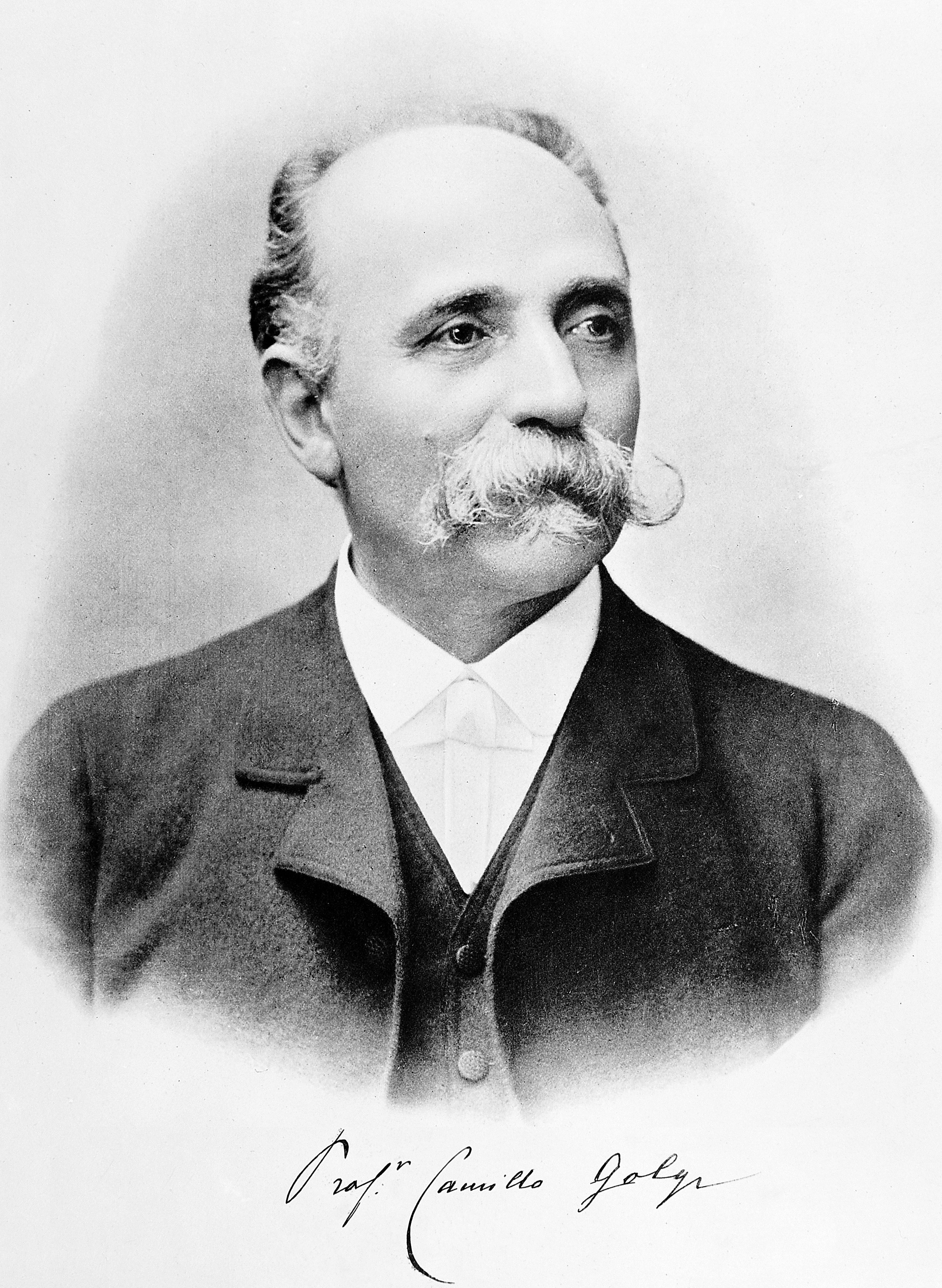
Camillo Golgi

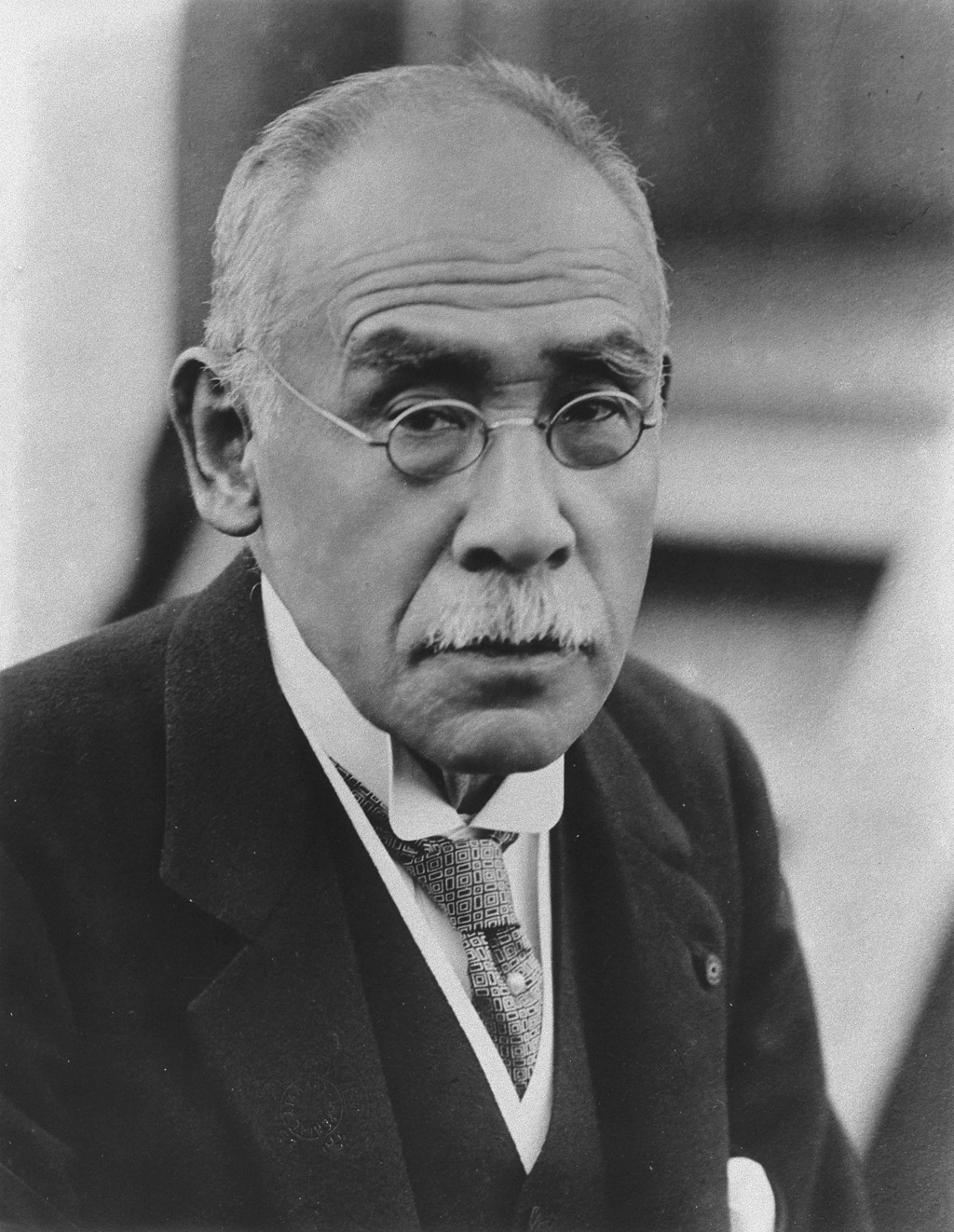
Kato Takaaki

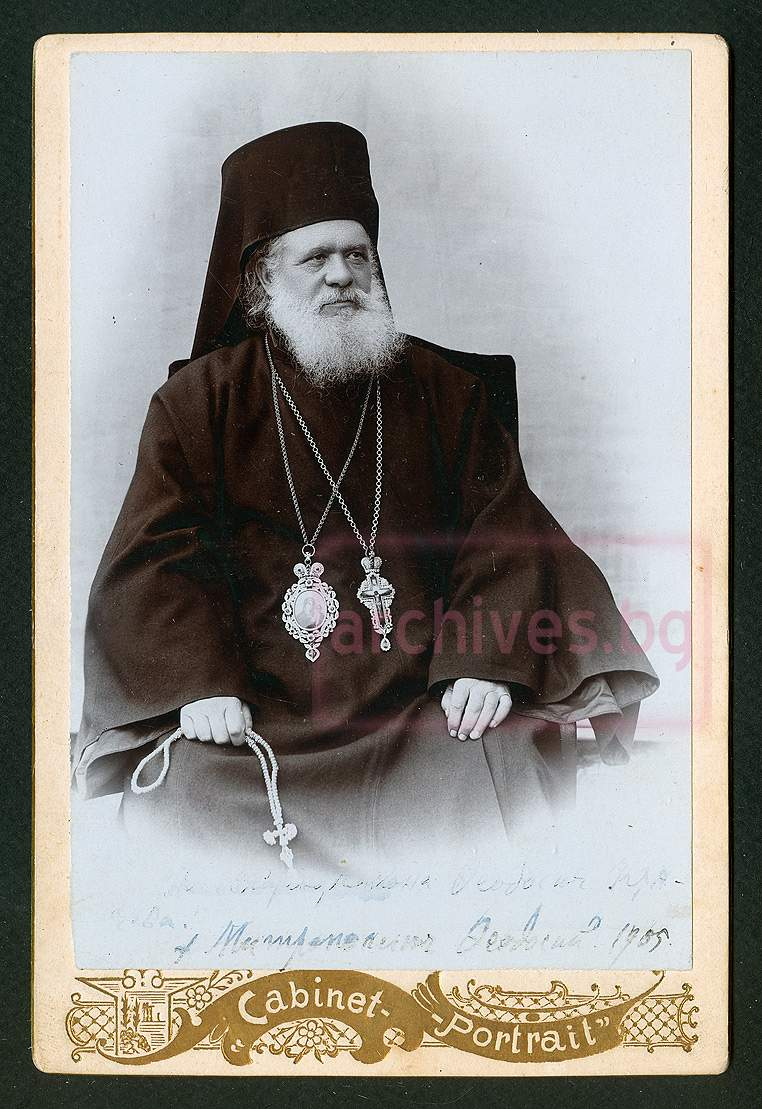
Theodosius of Skopje

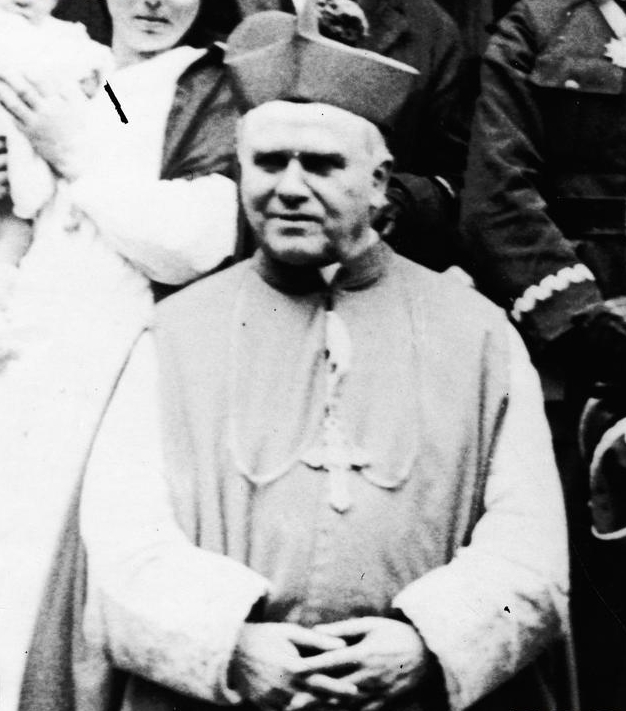
Jan Cieplak

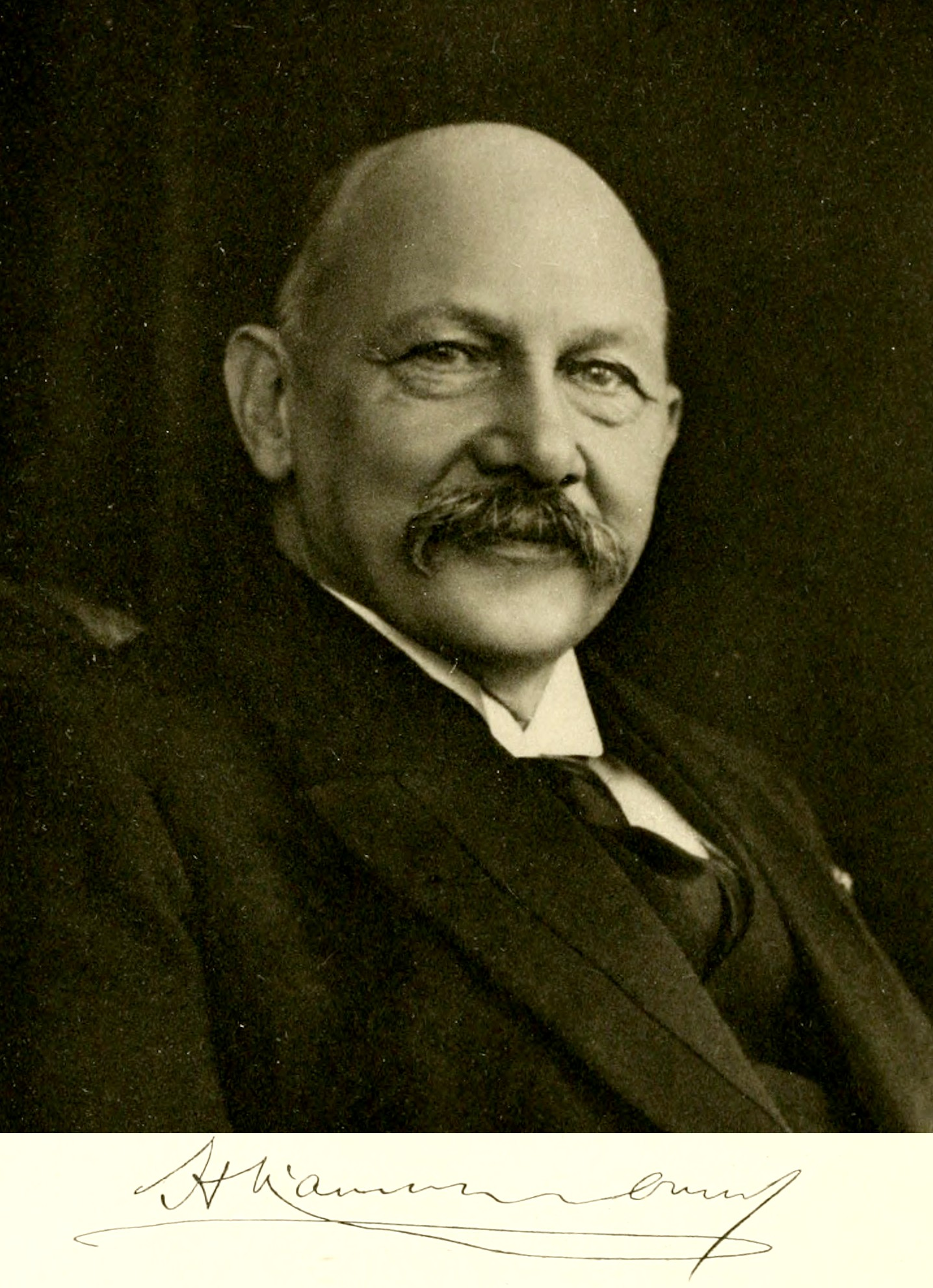
Heike Kamerlingh Onnes

- January 4 – Margherita of Savoy, Queen consort of Italy (b. 1851)
- January 6 – John Bowers, British Anglican bishop (b. 1854)
- January 12 – Sir Austin Chapman, Australian politician (b. 1864)
- January 15
  - Giambattista De Curtis, Italian painter (b. 1860)
  - Louis Majorelle, French furniture designer (b. 1859)
  - Enrico Toselli, Italian pianist and composer (b. 1883)
- January 21
  - Marie C. Brehm, American suffragette (b. 1859)
  - Camillo Golgi, Italian physician, recipient of the Nobel Prize in Physiology or Medicine (b. 1843)
- January 23 – Désiré-Joseph Mercier, Belgian Catholic cardinal and philosopher (b. 1851)
- January 26
  - Bucura Dumbravă, Hungarian-born Romanian novelist, promoter, hiker and Theosophist (b. 1868)
  - Joseph Sarsfield Glass, American Roman Catholic prelate (b. 1874)
- January 28
  - Katō Takaaki, Japanese politician, 24th Prime Minister of Japan (b. 1860)
  - Sir Ernest Troubridge, British admiral (b. 1862)
- January 30 – Barbara La Marr, American film actress (b. 1896)
- February 1 – Theodosius of Skopje, Bulgaria Orthodox religious leader and saint (b. 1846)
- February 5 – Gustav Eberlein, German sculptor, painter and writer (b. 1847)
- February 6 – Carrie Clark Ward, American stage and film character actress (b. 1862)
- February 8 – William Bateson, British geneticist (b. 1861)
- February 10 – Aqif Pasha Elbasani, Albanian political figure (b. 1860)
- February 12 – Art Smith, American pilot (b. 1890)
- February 13 – Francis Ysidro Edgeworth, Anglo-Irish philosopher and political economist (b. 1845)
- February 14 – John Jacob Bausch, German-born American optician, co-founder of Bausch & Lomb (b. 1830)
- February 17 – Jan Cieplak, Polish Roman Catholic priest, bishop and servant of God (b. 1857)
- February 21 – Heike Kamerlingh Onnes, Dutch physicist, Nobel Prize laureate (b. 1853)
- February 24 – Eddie Plank, American baseball player and MLB Hall of Famer (b. 1875)
- February 27 – Bronislav Grombchevsky, Soviet army and explorer (b. 1855)
- March 2 – Patriarch Macarius II (b. 1835)
- March 3 – Eugenia Mantelli, Italian opera singer (b. 1860)
- March 11 – Maibelle Heikes Justice, American novelist and screenwriter (b. 1871)
- March 12 – E. W. Scripps, American newspaper publisher (b. 1854)
- March 16 – Sergeant Stubby, World War I American hero war dog (b. 1916)
- March 17 – Aleksei Brusilov, Russian general (b. 1853)
- March 19 – Friedrich Brodersen, German opera singer (b. 1873)
- March 20
  - Krishna Govinda Gupta, Indian statesman, member of Indian Civil Service (b. 1851)
  - Louise of Sweden, Queen consort of Denmark (b. 1851)
- March 24 – Sizzo, Prince of Schwarzburg (b. 1860)
- March 26 – Constantin Fehrenbach, German politician and 13th Chancellor of Germany (b. 1852)
- March 28 – Prince Philippe, Duke of Orléans, claimant to the French throne (b. 1869)
- March 29 – Charles Williamson Crook, British teacher, trade unionist and politician (b. 1862)
- March 30 – Melvin Edwards, American abstract sculptor, printmaker, and arts educator (b. 1937)
- March 31 – Jacob Pavlovich Adler, Russian actor (b. 1855)

=== April–June ===
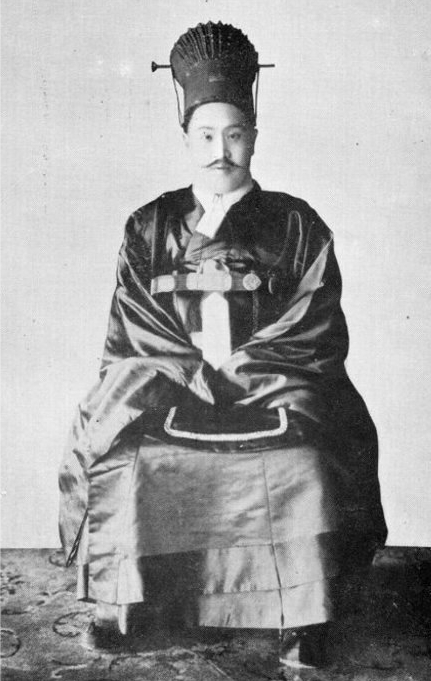
Emperor Sunjong

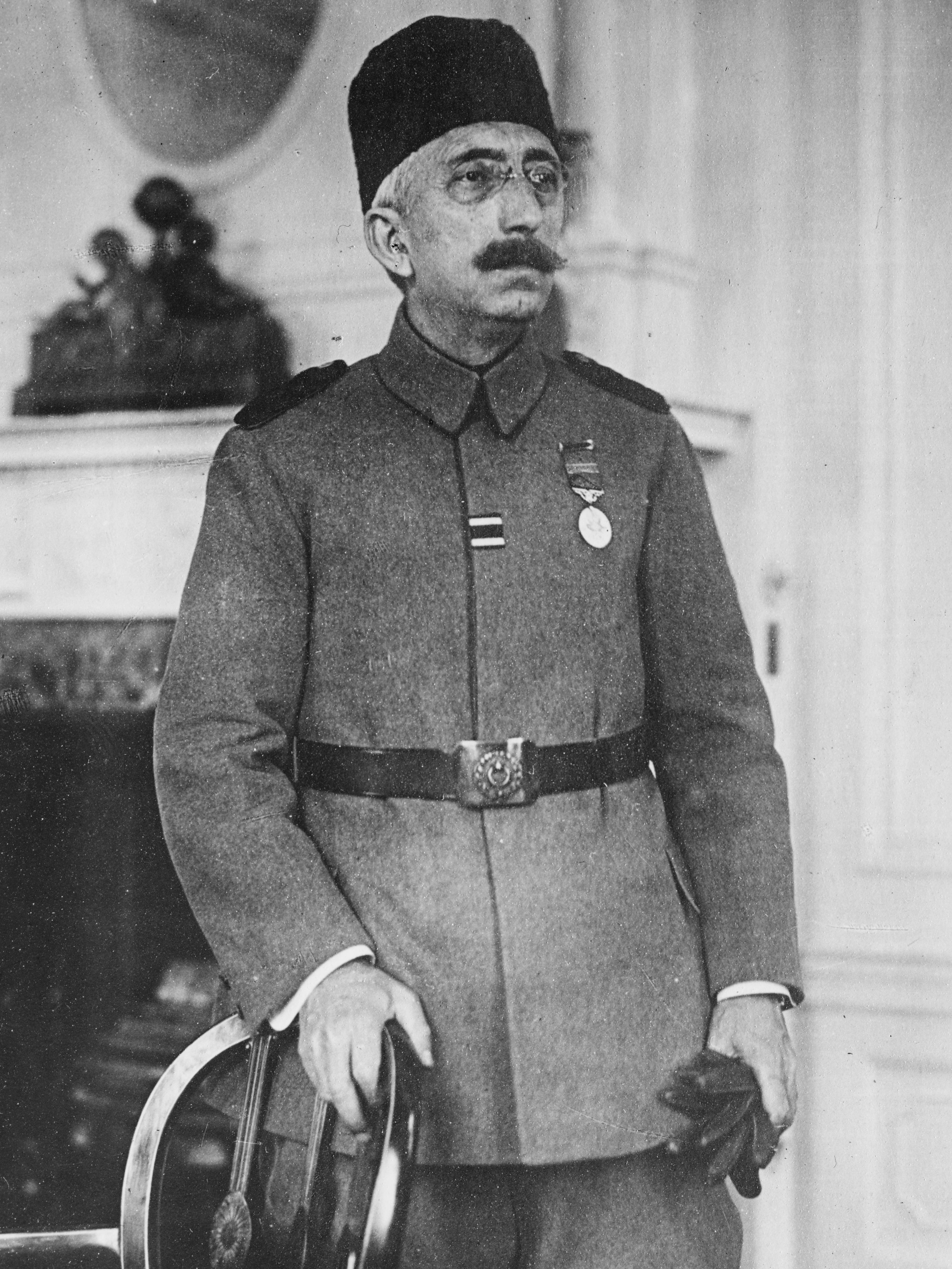
Sultan Mehmed VI

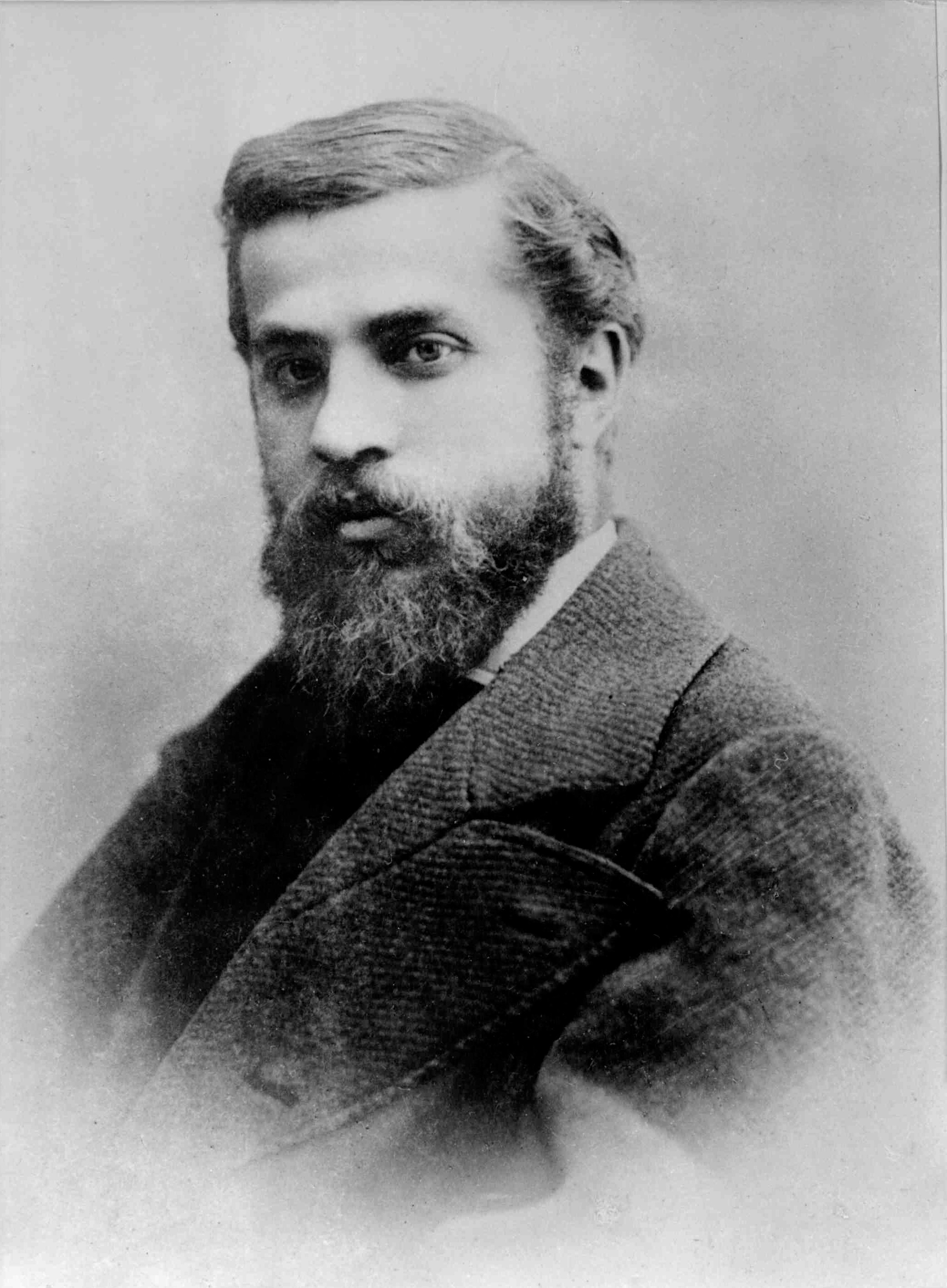
Antoni Gaudí

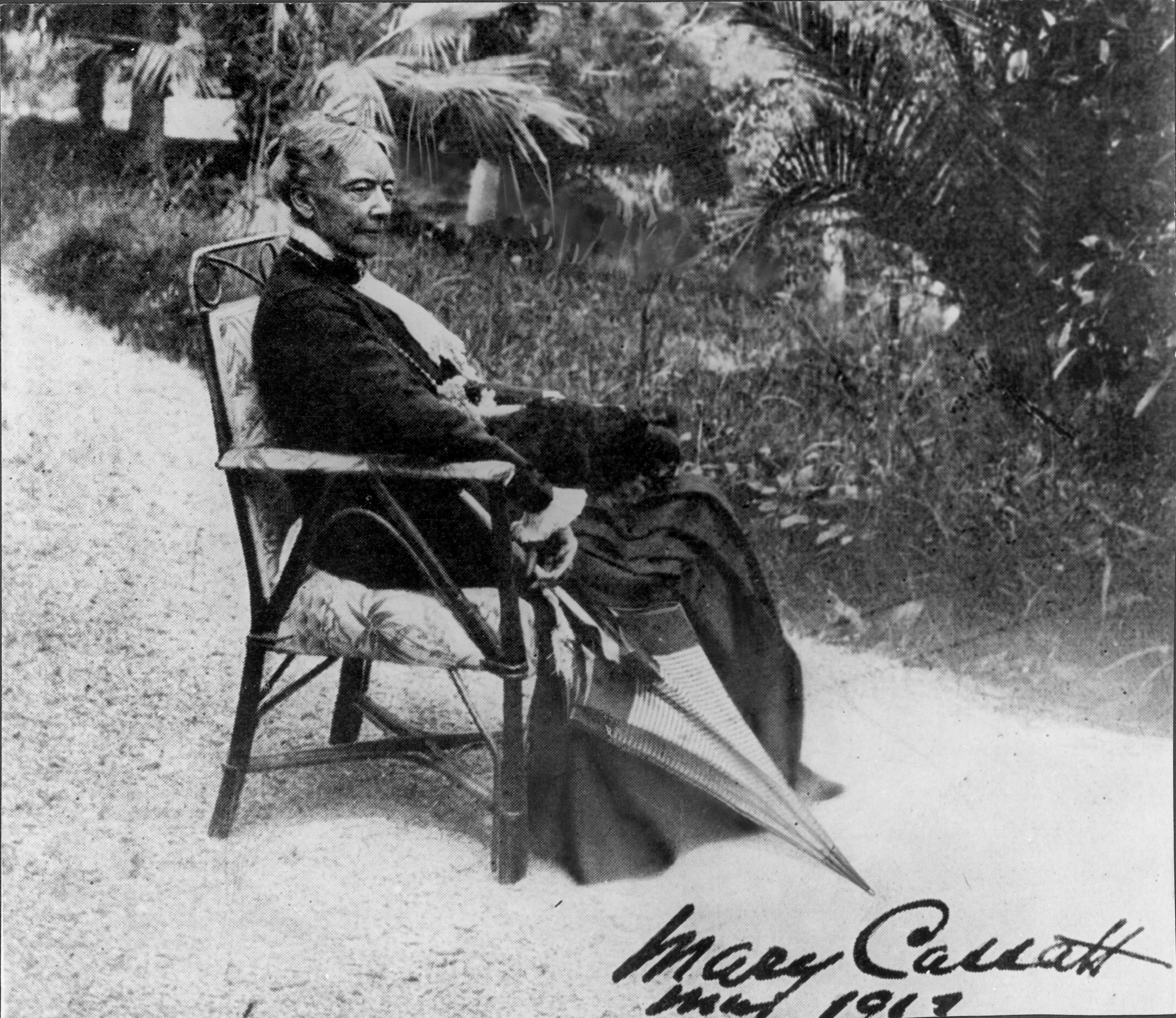
Mary Cassatt

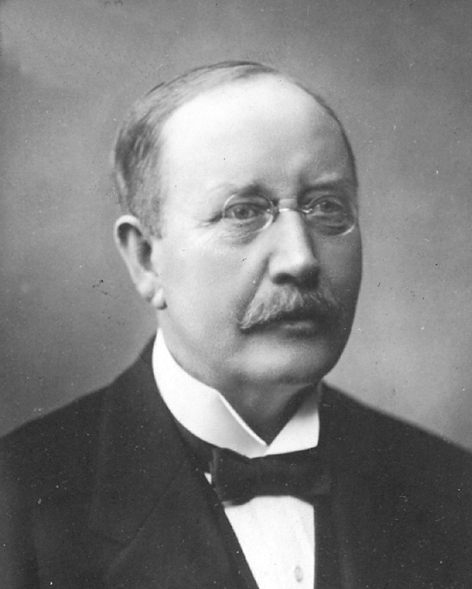
Jón Magnússon

- April 4 – Thomas Burberry, English businessman and inventor (b. 1835)
- April 7 – Giovanni Amendola, Italian journalist and politician (b. 1882)
- April 9 – Henry Miller, British-born American stage actor and producer (b. 1859)
- April 10 – Ōshima Yoshimasa, Japanese general (b. 1850)
- April 11 – Luther Burbank, American biologist, botanist and agricultural scientist (b. 1849)
- April 14 – Otto Stark, American painter (b. 1859)
- April 17 – Antonio Adolfo Pérez y Aguilar, Salvadorian Roman Catholic archbishop (b. 1839)
- April 19 – Alexander Alexandrovich Chuprov, Soviet statistician (b. 1874)
- April 20 – Billy Quirk, American actor (b. 1873)
- April 22 – Federico Gana, Chilean writer and diplomat (b. 1867)
- April 25
  - Sunjong, last Emperor of Korea (b. 1874)
  - Ellen Key, Swedish feminist writer (b. 1849)
  - Jeffreys Lewis, English-born stage actress (b. 1852)
- April 28 – Kawamura Kageaki, Japanese field marshal (b. 1850)
- April 30 – Bessie Coleman, American pilot (b. 1892)
- May 3 – Victor, Prince Napoleon (b. 1862)
- May 7 – Lillian Lawrence, American actress (b. 1868)
- May 9 – J. M. Dent, British publisher (b. 1849)
- May 10
  - Alton B. Parker, American judge and political candidate (b. 1852)
  - Giacinto Menotti Serrati, Italian politician (b. 1874)
- May 16 – Mehmed VI, Ottoman Sultan (b. 1861)
- May 18 – Count Nikolaus Szécsen von Temerin (b. 1857)
- May 22 – Tomás Arejola, Filipino lawyer, legislator, diplomat and writer (b. 1865)
- May 25 – Symon Petliura, Ukrainian independence fighter (b. 1879)
- May 26 – Frank Nelson Cole, American mathematician (b. 1861)
- May 27 – Michele Comella, Italian painter (b. 1856)
- June 4 – Fred Spofforth, Australian cricketer (b. 1853)
- June 8
  - Emily Hobhouse, British welfare campaigner (b. 1860)
  - Mariam Thresia Chiramel, Indian Catholic professed religious and stigmatist (b. 1876)
- June 9 – Sanford B. Dole, President of Hawaii and 1st Territorial Governor of Hawaii (b. 1844)
- June 10 – Antoni Gaudí, Spanish architect (b. 1852)
- June 13 – Nikolay Chkheidze, Soviet politician (b. 1864)
- June 14
  - Mary Cassatt, American painter and printmaker (b. 1844)
  - Windham Wyndham-Quin, 4th Earl of Dunraven and Mount-Earl, Anglo-Irish politician (b. 1841)
- June 18 – Olga Constantinovna of Russia, Queen consort of Greece (b. 1851)
- June 23 – Jón Magnússon, Icelandic politician, 1st Prime Minister of Iceland (b. 1857)

=== July–September ===
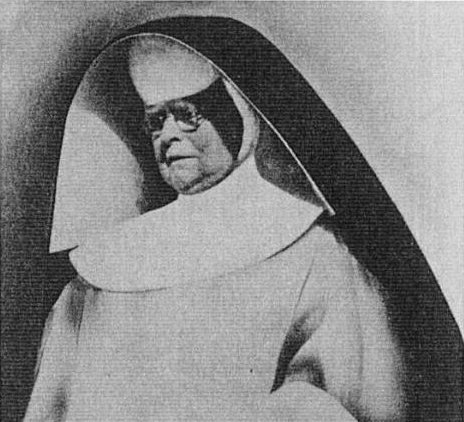
Mother Mary Alphonsa

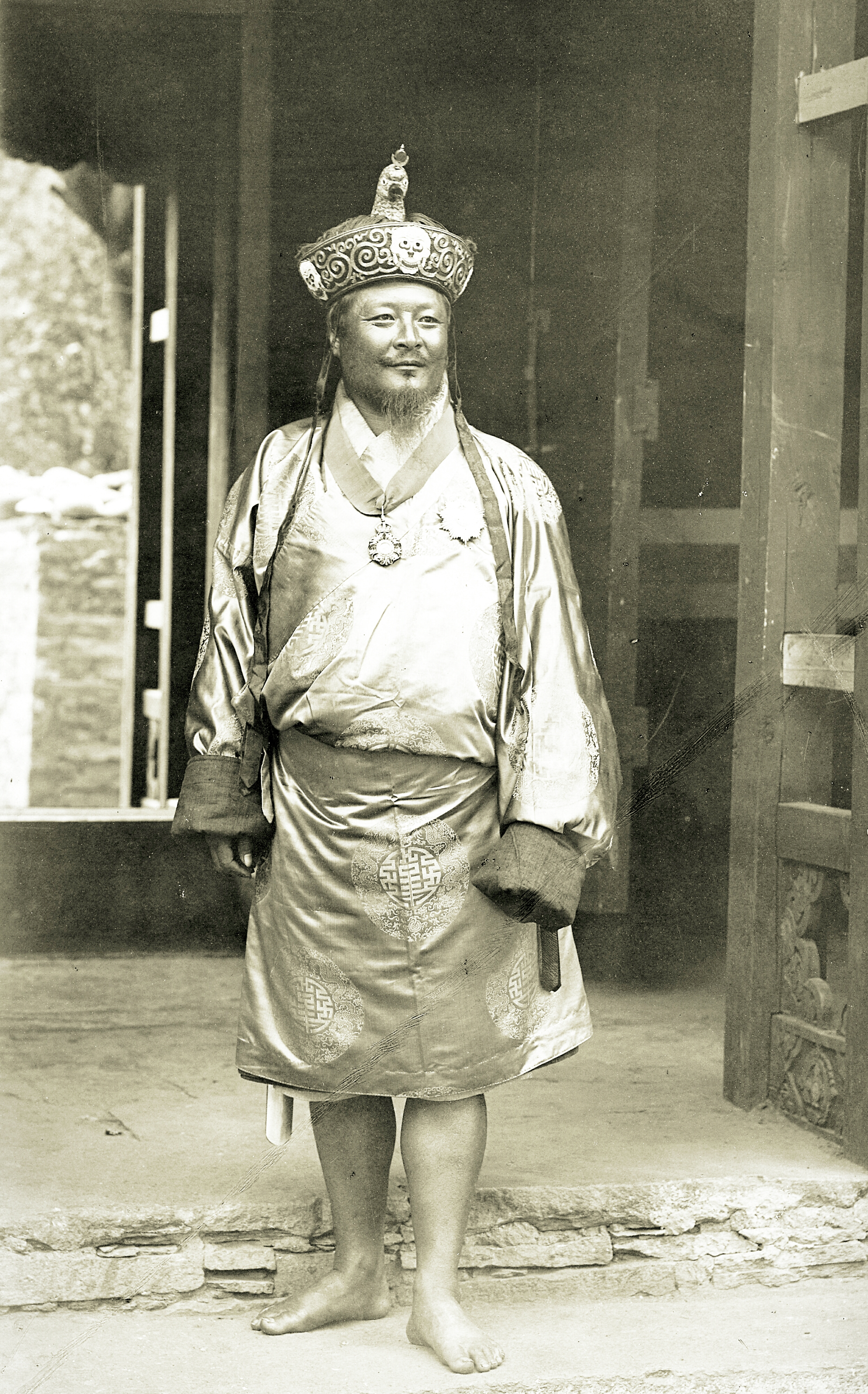
King Ugyen Wangchuck

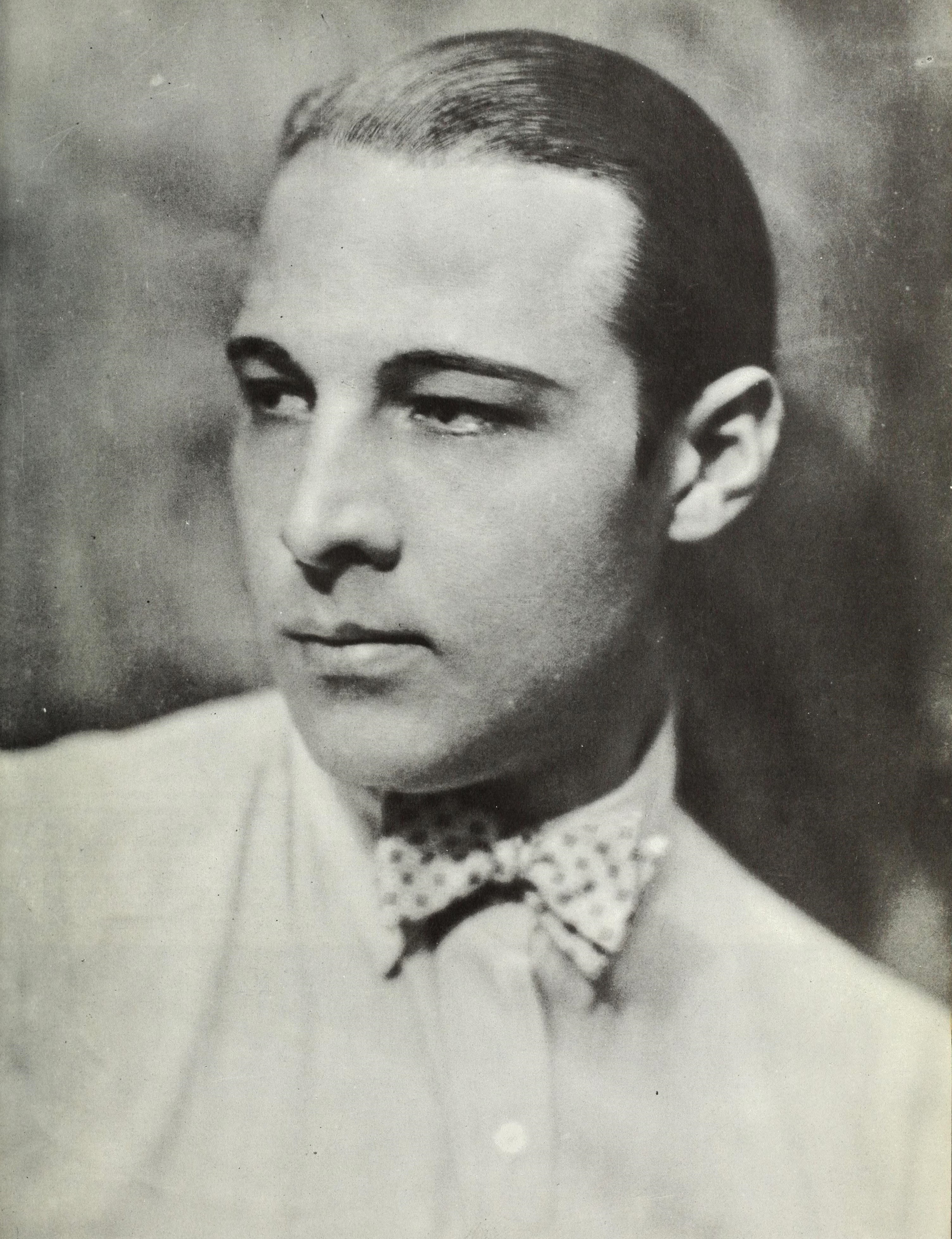
Rudolph Valentino

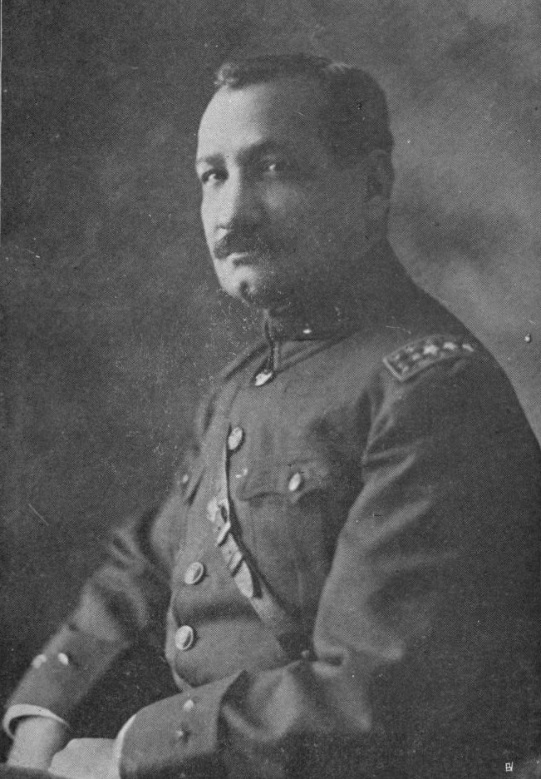
José María Orellana

- July 1 – Carlo Luigi Spegazzini, Italian-born Argentine botanist and mycologist (b. 1858)
- July 2
  - Émile Coué, French psychologist (b. 1857)
  - Kristján Jónsson, Minister for Iceland (b. 1852)
- July 9 – Mother Mary Alphonsa, American Roman Catholic religious sister, social worker, foundress and venerable (b. 1851)
- July 12
  - Gertrude Bell, British archaeologist, writer, spy and administrator; known as the "Uncrowned Queen of Iraq" (b. 1868)
  - John W. Weeks, American politician in the Republican Party (b. 1860)
- July 14 – Roshanara, Anglo-Indian dancer (b. 1894)
- July 17 – Bernard Coyne, Irish Roman Catholic clergyman (b. 1854)
- July 18 – Tiburcio Arnáiz Muñoz, Spanish Roman Catholic priest and venerable (b. 1865)
- July 22
  - Willard Louis, American actor (b. 1882)
  - Friedrich von Wieser, Austrian economist (b. 1851)
- July 23
  - Charles Avery, American actor, director and screenwriter (b. 1873)
  - Fumiko Kaneko, Japanese anarchist and nihilist (b. 1903)
- July 26
  - Ella Adayevskaya, Soviet composer (b. 1846)
  - Philippe Sudré Dartiguenave, Haitian political figure, 25th President of Haiti (b. 1863)
  - Robert Todd Lincoln, American statesman and businessman, son of 16th President Abraham Lincoln (b. 1843)
- July 30 – Albert B. Cummins, American lawyer and politician (b. 1850)
- August 1 – Israel Zangwill, British novelist and playwright (b. 1864)
- August 6 – Constantin Climescu, Romanian mathematician and politician (b. 1844)
- August 14 – John H. Moffitt, American politician (b. 1843)
- August 22
  - Charles W. Eliot, President of Harvard University (b. 1834)
  - Joe Moore, American actor (b. 1894)
- August 23 – Rudolph Valentino, Italian actor (b. 1895)
- August 26 – Ugyen Wangchuck, King of Bhutan (b. 1861)
- August 27 – John Rodgers, American naval officer and naval aviation pioneer (b. 1881)
- August 30 – Eddie Lyons, American actor (b. 1886)
- September 15
  - Alexander Boyter, American stonemason (b. 1848)
  - Rudolf Christoph Eucken, German writer, Nobel Prize laureate (b. 1846)
- September 17 – Rashid Tali’a, 1st Prime Minister of Transjordan (b. 1877)
- September 21 – Léon Charles Thévenin, French telegraph engineer (b. 1857)
- September 25 – Herbert Booth, English Salvationist, third son of William and Catherine Booth (b. 1862)
- September 26 – José María Orellana, Guatemalan political and military leader, 14th President of Guatemala (b. 1872)

=== October–December ===
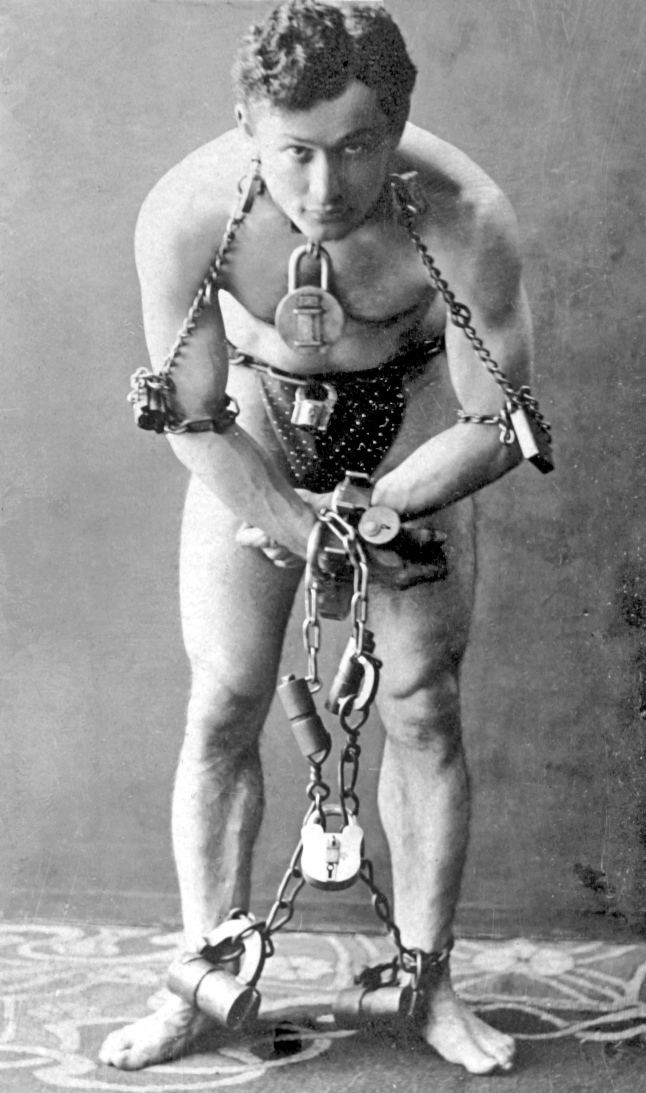
Harry Houdini

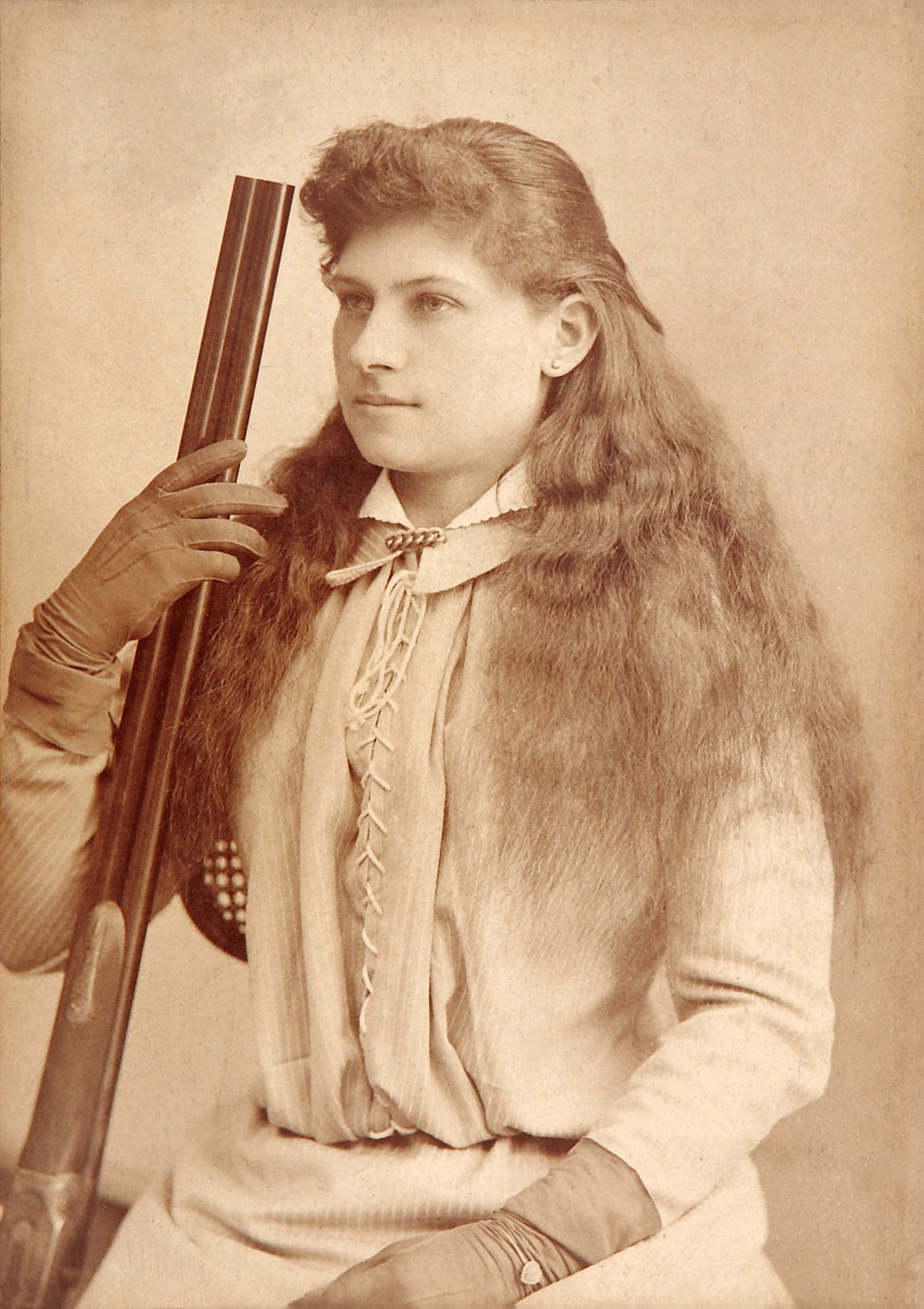
Annie Oakley

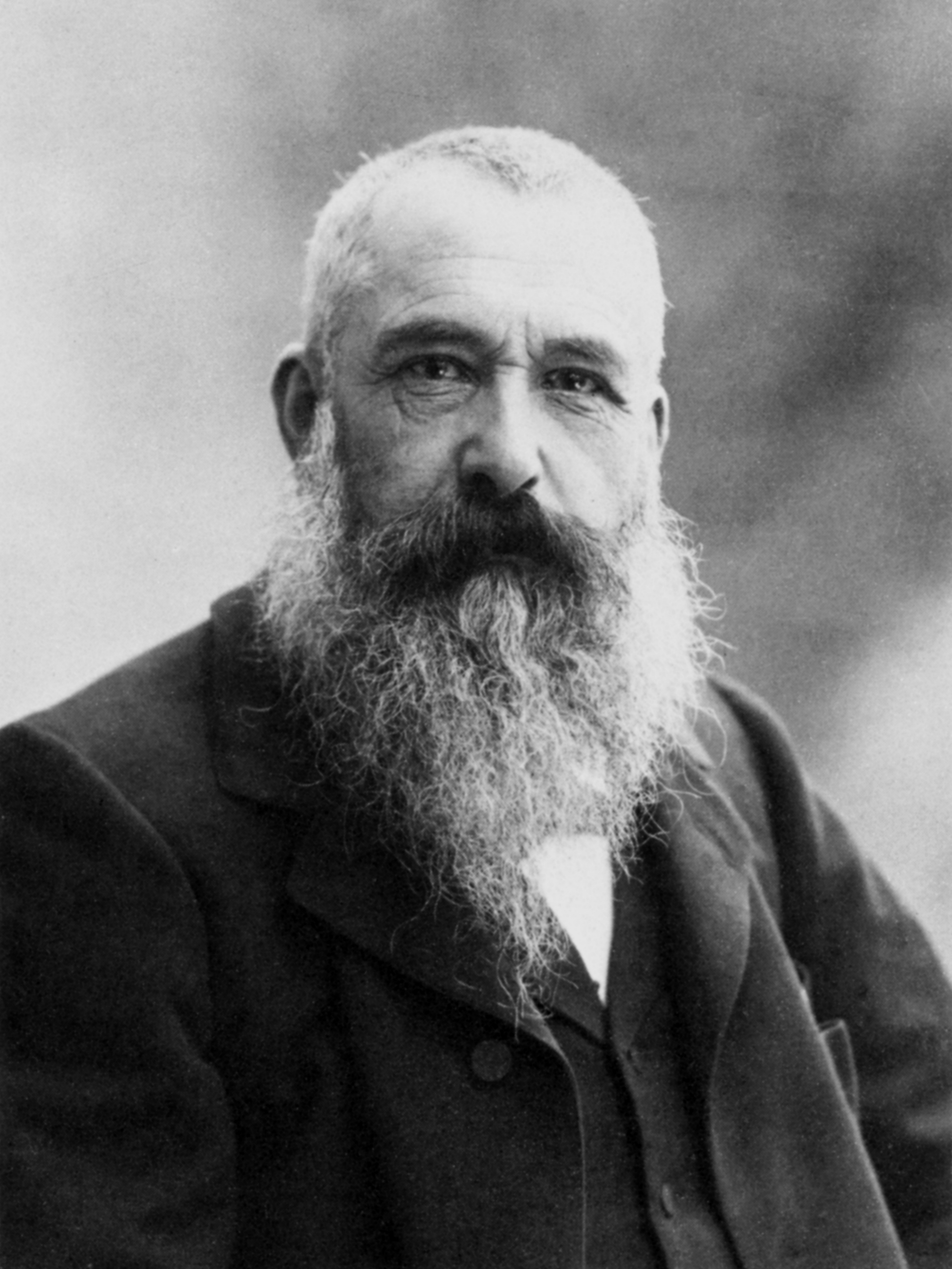
Claude Monet

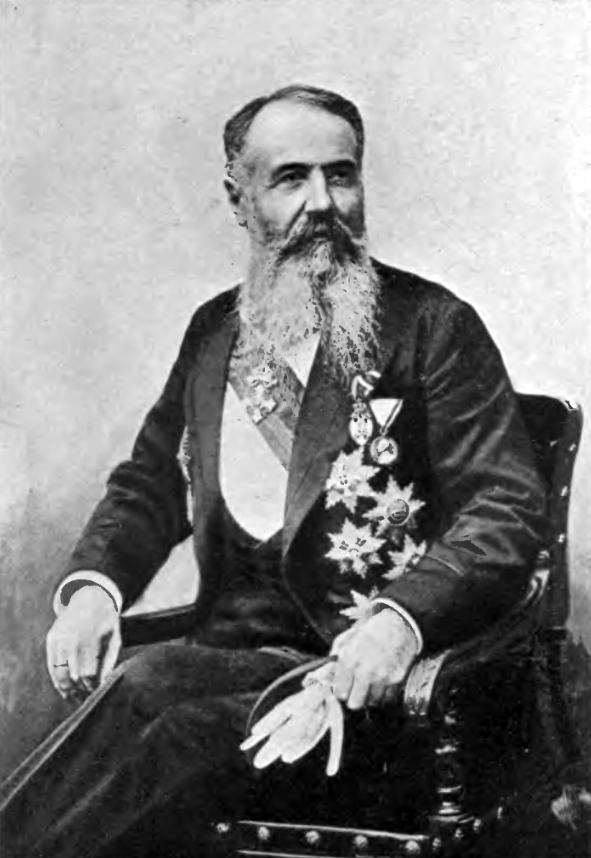
Nikola Pašić

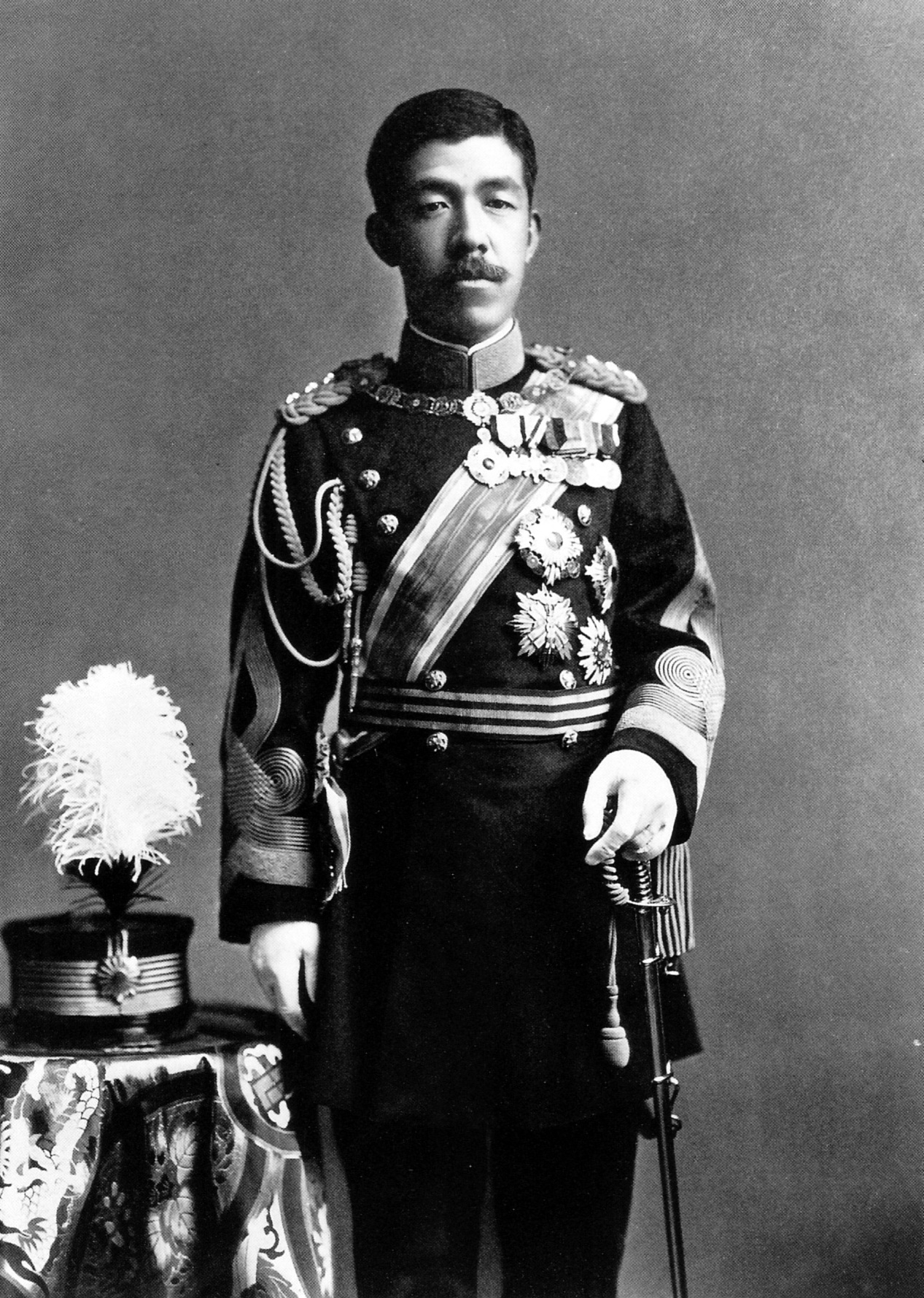
Emperor Taishō

- October 7 – Emil Kraepelin, German psychiatrist (b. 1856)
- October 9
  - Vaso Abashidze, Georgian actor (b. 1854)
  - Josias von Heeringen, German general (b. 1850)
  - Evald Relander, Finnish teacher, agronomist and banker (b. 1856)
- October 11
  - Hymie Weiss, American gangster (b. 1898)
- October 12
  - Edwin Abbott Abbott, English author and theologian (b. 1838)
  - Paul Puhallo von Brlog, Croatian Austro-Hungarian general (b. 1856)
- October 16 – Princess Frederica of Hanover (b. 1848)
- October 18 – José Maria Mora Cuban born portrait photographer (b. 1847)
- October 19
  - Victor Babeș, Romanian bacteriologist (b. 1854)
  - Ludvig Karsten, German painter (b. 1876)
- October 20 – Eugene V. Debs, American labor and political leader (b. 1855)
- October 24 – Salomon Ehrmann, Czech-born Austrian dermatologist and histologist (b. 1854)
- October 31
  - Harry Houdini, Hungarian-born American escapologist (b. 1874)
  - Charles Vance Millar, Canadian businessman (b. 1853)
- November 3 – Annie Oakley, American sharpshooter and entertainer (b. 1860)
- November 6 – Carl Swartz, Swedish politician, 14th Prime Minister of Sweden (b. 1858)
- November 7 – Tom Forman, American actor and director (b. 1893)
- November 10 – Lyubov Dostoyevskaya, Russian writer (b. 1869)
- November 19 – Thomas Cusack, American entrepreneur, pioneer and politician (b. 1858)
- November 21 – Joseph McKenna, American politician and Associate Justice of the Supreme Court (b. 1843)
- December 2 – Gérard Cooreman, Belgian politician, 21st Prime Minister of Belgium (b. 1852)
- December 3 – Siegfried Jacobsohn, German writer and critic (b. 1881)
- December 4 – Ivana Kobilca, Slovenian painter (b. 1861)
- December 5 – Claude Monet, French painter (b. 1840)
- December 10 – Nikola Pašić, Serbian and Yugoslav statesman, 33rd Prime Minister of Serbia and 4th Prime Minister of Yugoslavia (b. 1845)
- December 16 – William Larned, American tennis champion (b. 1872)
- December 17 – Lars Magnus Ericsson, Swedish inventor and founder of Ericsson (b. 1846)
- December 20 – Narcisa Freixas, Spanish painter and sculptor (b. 1859)
- December 22 – Mina Arndt, New Zealand painter (b. 1885)
- December 24 – Johan Castberg, Norwegian Radical politician (b. 1862)
- December 25
  - Oleksander Barvinsky, Ukrainian politician (b. 1847)
  - Emperor Taishō, Emperor of Japan, one of the leaders of World War I (b. 1879)
- December 27 – Amalia Riégo, Swedish opera singer (b. 1850)
- December 28 – Robert William Felkin, British-born medical missionary, explorer, anthropologist and occultist (b. 1853)
- December 29 – Rainer Maria Rilke, Austrian poet (b. 1875)
- December 30 – Felice Napoleone Canevaro, Italian admiral (b. 1838)

== Nobel Prizes ==

- Physics – Jean Baptiste Perrin
- Chemistry – Theodor Svedberg
- Physiology or Medicine – Johannes Andreas Grib Fibiger
- Literature – Grazia Deledda
- Peace – Aristide Briand, Gustav Stresemann
