= Kayastha =

Community of India

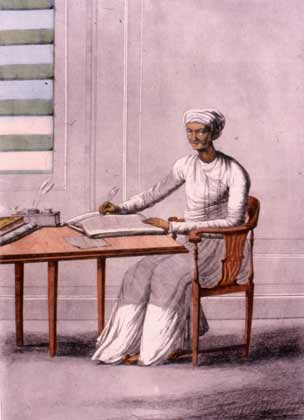
- "Calcutta Kayastha", a late 18th-century depiction by Frans Balthazar Solvyns
- Religions: Majority: Hinduism; Minority: Islam
- Country: India, Nepal, Pakistan, Bangladesh
- Region: Assam, Bihar, Chhattisgarh, Delhi, Jharkhand, Madhya Pradesh, Maharashtra, Orissa, Uttar Pradesh, West Bengal
- Subdivisions: Bengali Kayastha, Chandraseniya Kayastha Prabhu, Chitraguptavanshi Kayastha, Karan Kayastha

Kayastha (or Kayasth, IPA: [kaːjəst̪ʰ]) denotes a cluster of disparate Indian communities broadly categorised by the regions of the Indian subcontinent in which they were traditionally located—the Chitraguptavanshi Kayasthas of northern India, the Chandraseniya Kayastha Prabhus of Maharashtra, the Bengali Kayasthas of Bengal and Karanas of Odisha. All of them were traditionally considered "writing castes", who had historically served the ruling powers as administrators, ministers and record-keepers.

The earliest known reference to the term Kayastha dates back to the Kushan Empire, when it evolved into a common name for a writer or scribe. In the Sanskrit literature and inscriptions, it was used to denote the holders of a particular category of offices in the government service. In this context, the term possibly derived from kaya- ('principal, capital, treasury') and -stha ('to stay') and perhaps originally stood for an officer of the royal treasury, or revenue department.

Over the centuries, the occupational histories of Kayastha communities largely revolved around scribal services. However, these scribes did not simply take dictation but acted in the range of capacities better indicated by the term "secretary". They used their training in law, literature, court language, accounting, litigation and many other areas to fulfill responsibilities in all these venues. Kayasthas, along with Brahmins, had access to formal education as well as their own system of teaching administration, including accountancy, in the early-medieval India.

Modern scholars list them among Indian communities that were traditionally described as "urban-oriented", "upper caste" and part of the "well-educated" pan-Indian elite, alongside Punjabi Khatris, Kashmiri Pandits, Parsis, Nagar Brahmins of Gujarat, Bengali Bhadraloks, Chitpawans and Chandraseniya Kayastha Prabhus (CKPs) of Maharashtra, South-Indian Brahmins including Deshastha Brahmins from Southern parts of India and upper echelons of the Muslim as well as Christian communities that made up the middle class at the time of Indian independence in 1947.

== Origins ==
=== Etymology ===
According to Merriam-Webster, the word Kāyastha is probably formed from the Sanskrit kāya (body or group), and the suffix -stha (standing, being in).

=== As a class of administrators ===
As evidenced by literary and epigraphical texts, Kayasthas had emerged as a 'class of administrators' between late-ancient and early-mediaeval period of Indian history. Their emergence is explained by modern scholars as a result of growth of state machinery, complication of taxation system and the "rapid expansion of land-grant practice that required professional documenting fixation". The term also finds mention in an inscription of the Gupta emperor Kumaragupta I, dated to 442 CE, in which prathama-kāyastha (transl. 'chief officer') is used as an administrative designation. The Yājñavalkya Smṛti, also from the Gupta era, and the Vishnu Smriti describe kayasthas as record-keepers and accountants, but not as jāti (caste or clan). Similarly, the term Kayastha is used in the works of Kshemendra, Kalhana and Bilhana to refer to members of bureaucracy varying from Gṛhakṛtyamahattama (transl. 'the chief secretary in the charge of home affairs') to the Aśvaghāsa-kāyastha (transl. 'officer in charge of the fodder for horses').

According to Romila Thapar, the offices that demanded formal education including that of a kayastha were generally occupied by the "Brahmins, revenue collectors, treasurers and those concerned with legal matters".

=== In Buddhist association ===
According to Chitrarekha Gupta, it is possible that Buddhists, in their effort to create an educated non-Brahmin class, strove to popularise the utility of education and fostered those vocations that required a knowledge of writing. This is corroborated in Udāna, where the lekha-sippa ('craft of writing'), was regarded as the highest of all the crafts. It is also backed by the fact that the earliest epigraphical records mentioning lekhaka ('writer') or kayastha have been made in association with Buddhism.

=== As an independent guild of professionals ===
It is possible that kayasthas may have started out as a separate profession, similar to bankers, merchants, and artisans. As suggested in certain epigraphs, they had a representative in the district-level administration, along with those of bankers and merchants. This is also implied in Mudrarakshasa, where a kayastha would work for any man who paid his wages on time. Possibly secular knowledge, like writing, administration, and jurisprudence, was monopolised by a non-Brahmin professional elite that later came be referred as kayasthas.

== History ==
=== From classical to early-medieval India ===
The Kayasthas, at least as an office, played an important role in administering the Northern India from the Gupta period. The earliest evidence comes from a Mathura inscription of Vasudeva I, composed by a Kayastha Śramaṇa. From this point we find, the term kayastha occurring in the inscription of the Gupta Emperor Kumaragupta I as prathama-kāyastha, as karaṇa-kāyastha in Vainayagupta’s inscription, and as gauḍa-kāyastha in an Apshadha inscription dated 672 CE. The occasional references to individuals of the Karaṇa caste occupying high government offices are made in inscriptions and literary works too. Razia Banu has suggested that Brahmin and Kayastha migrants were brought to Bengal during the reign of the Gupta Empire to help manage the state affairs. According to a legend, a Bengali King named Adisur had invited Brahmins accompanied by Kayasthas from Kannauj who became an elite sub-group described as Kulin. However, such claims are disputable and even rejected by some scholars.

From the ninth-century and perhaps even earlier, Kayasthas had started to consolidate into a distinct caste. The Kayastha appears as a figure in Act IX of the Mṛcchakatika, a kāyastha is shown accompanying a judge (adhikaraṇika) and assisting him. In Act V there is mention that:

Moreover, O friend, a courtesan, an elephant, a Kayastha, a mendicant, a spy and a donkey—where these dwell, there not even villains can flourish.

In Mudrarakshasa, a Kayastha named Śakaṭadāsa is a crucial character and one of the trusted men of the Prime Minister of the Nanda King. According to Chitrarekha Gupta, the title Ārya added to the name of Śakaṭadāsa implies that he was a member of the nobility. Another Kayastha called Acala is the scribe of Chanakya.

In early-mediaeval Kashmir too, the term kayastha denoted an occupational class whose principal duty, besides carrying on the general administration of the state, consisted in the collection of revenue and taxes. Kshemendra’s Narmamālā composed during the reign of Ananta (1028-1063 CE) gives a list of contemporary Kayastha officers that included Gṛhakṛtyadhipati, Paripālaka, Mārgapati, Gañja-divira, Āsthāna-divira, Nagara-divira, Lekhakopādhya and Niyogi. Kalhana’s Rājataraṃgiṇī ('The River of Kings') and Bilhana's Vikramāṅkadevacarita ('Life of King Vikramaditya') also mention Kayasthas. It is also mentioned that father of Lalitaditya Muktapida of the Karkota Dynasty, Durlabhavardhan, had held the post of Aśvaghāsa-kāyastha.

Kayasthas have been authors of several Sanskrit texts too.

Table 1. Some important Sanskrit works authored by the Kayasthas
| Work(s) | Genre(s) | Author | Author's lineage | Date |
|---|---|---|---|---|
| Rāmacarita | Biography | Sandhyākaranandin | Karana | 12th c. |
| Udayasundarī Kathā | Champu | Soḍḍhala | Vālabhya | 11th c. |
| Rasa Saṅketa Kalikā, Varṇanighaṇṭu | Medicine, Tantra | Kāyastha Cāmuṇḍa | Naigama | 15th c. |
| Kṛtyakalpataru | Administration | Lakṣmīdhara | Vāstavya | 12th c. |

==== In Brahmanical literature ====
Kayasthas have been recorded as a separate caste responsible for writing secular documents and maintaining records in Brahmanical religious writings dating back to the seventh-century. In these texts, some described Kayasthas as Kshatriyas, while others often described them as a 'mixed-origin' caste with Brahmin and Shudra components. This was probably an attempt by the Brahmins to rationalise their rank in the traditional caste hierarchy and perhaps a later invention rather than a historical fact.

=== Late medieval India ===
After the Muslim conquest of India, they mastered Persian, which became the official language of the Mughal courts. Some converted to Islam and formed the Muslim Kayasth community in northern India.

Bengali Kayasthas had been the dominant landholding caste prior to the Muslim conquest, and continued this role under Muslim rule. Indeed, Muslim rulers had from a very early time confirmed the Kayasthas in their ancient role as landholders and political intermediaries.

Bengali Kayasthas served as treasury officials and wazirs (government ministers) under Mughal rule. Political scientist U. A. B. Razia Akter Banu writes that, partly because of Muslim sultans' satisfaction with them as technocrats, many Bengali Kayasthas in the administration became zamindars and jagirdars. According to Abu al-Fazl, most of the Hindu zamindars in Bengal were Kayasthas.

Maharaja Pratapaditya, the king of Jessore who declared independence from Mughal rule in the early 17th century, was a Bengali Kayastha.

=== British India ===
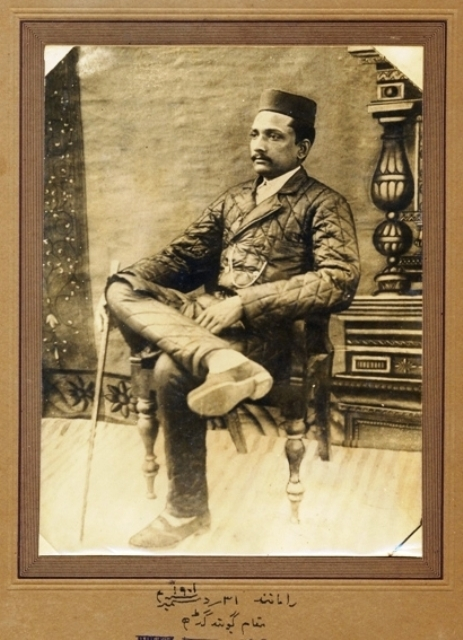
A Kayastha employee of the political agent of the Bagelkhand Agency 1901.

During the British Raj, Kayasthas continued to proliferate in public administration, qualifying for the highest executive and judicial offices open to Indians.

Bengali Kayasthas took on the role occupied by merchant castes in other parts of India and profited from business contacts with the British. In 1911, for example, Bengali Kayasthas and Bengali Brahmins owned 40% of all the Indian-owned mills, mines and factories in Bengal.

=== Modern India ===
The Chitraguptavanshi Kayasthas, Bengali Kayasthas and CKPs were among the Indian communities in 1947, at the time of Indian independence, that constituted the middle class and were traditionally "urban and professional" (following professions like doctors, lawyers, teachers, engineers, etc.) According to P. K. Varma, "education was a common thread that bound together this pan Indian elite" and almost all the members of these communities could read and write English and were educated beyond school.

The Kayasthas today mostly inhabit central, eastern, northern India, and particularly Bengal. They are considered a Forward Caste, as they do not qualify for any of the reservation benefits allotted to Scheduled Castes and Scheduled Tribes and Other Backward Classes that are administered by the Government of India. This classification has increasingly led to feelings of unease and resentment among the Kayasthas, who believe that the communities that benefit from reservation are gaining political power and employment opportunities at their expense. Thus, particularly since the 1990 report of the Mandal Commission on reservation, Kayastha organisations have been active in areas such as Bihar, Madhya Pradesh, Bengal and Orissa. These groups are aligning themselves with various political parties to gain political and economic advantages; by 2009 they were demanding 33 per cent reservation in government jobs.

== Sub-groups ==
=== Chitraguptavanshi Kayasthas ===
The Chitraguptavanshi Kayasthas of Northern India are named thus because they have a myth of origin that says they descend from the 12 sons of the Hindu god Chitragupta, the product of his marriages to Devi Shobhavati and Devi Nandini. The suffix -vanshi is Sanskrit and translates as belonging to a particular family dynasty.

At least some Chitraguptavanshi subcastes seem to have formed by the 11th or 12th century, evidenced by various names being used to describe them in inscriptions. Although at that time, prior to the Muslim conquests in the Indian subcontinent, they were generally outnumbered by Brahmins in the Hindu royal courts of northern India, some among these Kayasthas wrote eulogies for the kings. Of the various regional Kayastha communities it was those of north India who remained most aligned to their role of scribes, whereas in other areas there became more emphasis on commerce.

The group of Bhatnagar, Srivastava, Ambashtha and Saxena of Doab were classified by various Indian, British and missionary observers to be the most learned and dominant of the "service castes".

=== Bengali Kayasthas ===
In eastern India, Bengali Kayasthas are believed to have evolved from a class of officials into a caste between the 5th-6th centuries and 11th-12th centuries, its component elements being putative Kshatriyas and mostly Brahmins. They most likely gained the characteristics of a caste under the Sena dynasty. According to Tej Ram Sharma, an Indian historian, the Kayasthas of Bengal had not yet developed into a distinct caste during the reign of the Gupta Empire, although the office of the Kayastha (scribe) had been instituted before the beginning of the period, as evidenced from the contemporary Smritis. Sharma further states:

Noticing brahmanic names with a large number of modern Bengali Kayastha cognomens in several early epigraphs discovered in Bengal, some scholars have suggested that there is a considerable brahmana element in the present day Kayastha community of Bengal. Originally the professions of Kayastha (scribe) and Vaidya (physician) were not restricted and could be followed by people of different varnas including the brahmanas. So there is every probability that a number of brahmana families were mixed up with members of other varnas in forming the present Kayastha and Vaidya communities of Bengal.

=== Chandraseniya Prabhu Kayasthas ===
In Maharashtra, Chandraseniya Kayastha Prabhus (CKP) claim descent from the warrior Chandrasen. Historically they produced prominent warriors and also held positions such as Deshpandes and Gadkaris (fort holder, an office similar to that of a castellan. The CKPs have the upanayana (thread ceremony) and have been granted the rights to study the vedas and perform vedic rituals along with the Brahmins.

=== Karanas ===
Karana is a community found predominantly in Odisha and Andhrapradesh. They are a prosperous and influential caste in Odisha and rank next to the Brahmins. They exclusively served the ruling powers as their ministers, advisors, governors, military commanders, record keepers and diwans. They have the highest literacy caste-wise and are highly prosperous. Karanas owned most Zamindaris in Odisha and were extremely rich. They also received large amounts of land grants in Khurda administration of Khurda Kingdom. They represent around 5% of Odia people. The Karanas are a forward caste of Odisha.

== Varna status ==
As the Kayasthas are a non-cohesive group with regional differences rather than a single caste, their position in the Hindu varna system of ritual classification has not been uniform.

This was reflected in Raj era court rulings. Hayden Bellenoit gives details of various Raj era law cases and concludes the varna Kayastha was resolved in those cases by taking into account regional differences and customs followed by the specific community under consideration. Bellenoit disagrees with Rowe, showing that Risley's theories were in fact used ultimately to classify them as Kshatriyas by the British courts. The first case began in 1860 in Jaunpur, Uttar Pradesh with a property dispute where the plaintiff was considered an "illegitimate child" by the defendants, a north-Indian Kayastha family. The British court denied inheritance to the child, citing that Kayasthas are Dvija, "twice-born" or "upper-caste" and that the illegitimate children of Dwijas have no rights to inheritance. In the next case in 1875 in the Allahabad High Court, a north Indian Kayastha widow was denied adoption rights as she was an upper-caste i.e. Dwija woman. However, the aforementioned 1884 adoption case and the 1916 property dispute saw the Calcutta High Court rule that the Bengali Kayasthas were shudras. The Allahabad High Court ruled in 1890 that Kayasthas were Kshatriyas. Hayden Bellenoit concludes from an analysis of those that

in the suits originating in the Bihari and Doabi heartlands rulings that Kayasthas were of twice-born status were more likely. Closer to Bengal country, though, the legal rulings tended to assign a shudra status.

Even where the shudra designation was adjudged, the Raj courts appear to have sometimes recognised that the Bengali Kayasthas were degraded from an earlier kshatriya status due to intermarrying with both shudras and slaves ('dasa') which resulted in the common Bengali Kayastha surname of 'Das'. The last completed census of the British Raj (1931) classified them as an "upper caste", i.e. Dwija, and the final British Raj law case involving their varna in 1926 determined them to be Kshatriya.

Other than literature by Europeans such as Max Müller and others, several Hindu religious scriptures and Hindu scholars' opinions were also used by the courts to decide the varna as well as make decisions in the specific cases. The Hindu texts referenced were Mitākṣarā, the Padmapurāṇa, “original Vyavashta of the Pundits of Kashmir”, Vishvanath Narayan Mandlik's books, (8th to 5th century BC authored) Yājñavalkya Smṛti, Vīramitrodaya (17th century), Bhaviṣyapurāṇa, Skandapurāṇa, Vivādacintāmaṇi of Vāchaspati Misra, Sanskrit Professor Sarvadhikari's literature, Dattakamīmāṃsā, Shyamcharan Sarkar’s Vyavasthādarpaṇa, etc. Some contemporary Hindu scholars referenced (as witnesses in person or indirectly by their writings) were two Benaras Pandits(Nityananda and Bast Ram Dube), Raja Ram Shastra( a Benares Sanskrit College professor, well versed in Hindu Dharmaśāstras) and Vishvanath Narayan Mandlik.

Earlier, in Bihar, in 1811–1812, botanist and zoologist Francis Buchanan had recorded the Kayastha of that region as "pure shudra" and accordingly kept them at the par with other producer caste groups like goldsmiths, Ahirs, Kurmis and the Koeris. William Pinch, in his study of Ramanandi Sampradaya in the north describes the emergence of the concept of "pure Shudra" in growing need of physical contact with some of the low caste groups who were producer and seller of essential commodities or were the provider of services without which the self sufficiency of rural society couldn't persist. However, many of these adopted Vaishnavism in the aim to become Kshatriya. In 1901 Bihar census, Kayasthas of the area were classified along with Brahmins and Rajputs in Bihar as "other castes of twice-born rank" According to Arun Sinha, there was a strong current since the end of the 19th century among Shudras of Bihar to change their status in caste hierarchy and break the monopoly of bipolar elite of Brahmins and Rajputs of having "dvija" status. The education and economic advancement made by some of the former Shudra castes enabled them to seek the higher prestige and varna status. Sinha further mentions that the Kayasthas of Bihar along with the Bhumihars were first among the shudras to attain the recognition as "upper caste" leaving the other aspirational castes to aspire for the same.

The Raj era rulings were based largely upon the theories of Herbert Hope Risley, who had conducted extensive studies on castes and tribes of the Bengal Presidency. According to William Rowe, the Kayasthas of Bengal, Bombay and the United Provinces repeatedly challenged this classification by producing a flood of books, pamphlets, family histories and journals to pressurise the government to recognise them as kshatriya and to reform the caste practices in the directions of sanskritisation and westernisation. Rowe's opinion has been challenged, with arguments that it is based on "factual and interpretative errors", and criticised for making "unquestioned assumptions" about the Kayastha Sanskritisation and westernisation movement.

In post-Raj assessments, the Bengali Kayasthas, alongside Bengali Brahmins, have been described as the "highest Hindu castes". After the Muslim conquest of India, they absorbed remnants of Bengal's old Hindu ruling dynasties—including the Sena, Pala, Chandra, and Varman—and, in this way, became the region's surrogate kshatriya or "warrior" class. During British rule, the Bengali Kayasthas, the Bengali Brahmins and the Baidyas considered themselves to be Bhadralok, a term coined in Bengal for the gentry or respectable people. This was based on their perceived refined culture, prestige and education.

Modern scholars like John Henry Hutton and Ronald Inden (Note: According to Lloyd Rudolph and Susanne Rudolph) consider the present varna status of Bengali Kayasthas as 'twice-born', while Julius J. Lipner considers their varna as disputed.

According to Christian Novetzke, in medieval India, Kayastha in certain parts were considered either as Brahmins or equal to Brahmins. Several religious councils and institutions have subsequently stated the varna status of CKPs as Kshatriya.

== Socio-economic condition ==
In 2023, Government of Bihar published the data of 2022 Bihar caste-based survey. It showed that amongst the Forward castes of Bihar, Kayastha was the most prosperous one with lowest poverty. Out of total families of Kayasthas residing in the state, only 13.38% were poor. The community totally numbered 1,70,985 families, out of which 23,639 families were poor.

== Kayasthas in Nepal ==
The Central Bureau of Statistics of Nepal classifies the Kayastha as a subgroup within the broader social group of Madheshi Brahmin/Chhetri (together with Terai Brahmins and Rajputs). At the time of the 2011 Nepal census, 44,304 people (0.2% of the population of Nepal) were Kayastha. The frequency of Kayasthas by province was as follows:

- Madhesh Province (0.5%)
- Lumbini Province (0.2%)
- Bagmati Province (0.1%)
- Koshi Province (0.1%)
- Gandaki Province (0.0%)
- Karnali Province (0.0%)
- Sudurpashchim Province (0.0%)

The frequency of Kayasthas was higher than national average (0.2%) in the following districts:

- Parsa (1.0%)
- Dhanusha (0.8%)
- Banke (0.6%)
- Mahottari (0.4%)
- Morang (0.4%)
- Rautahat (0.4%)
- Sarlahi (0.4%)
- Kapilvastu (0.3%)
- Saptari (0.3%)
- Siraha (0.3%)

== Notable people ==
This is a list of notable people from all the subgroups of Kayasthas.

=== President of India ===
- Rajendra Prasad

=== Prime Minister of India ===
- Lal Bahadur Shastri

=== Chief Ministers ===
- Jyoti Basu
- Nabakrushna Choudhuri
- Biplab Kumar Deb
- Shiv Charan Mathur
- Biren Mitra
- Biju Patnaik
- Janaki Ballabh Patnaik
- Naveen Patnaik
- Bidhan Chandra Roy
- Krishna Ballabh Sahay
- Sampurnanand
- Manik Sarkar
- Mahamaya Prasad Sinha
- Uddhav Thackeray

=== Others ===
- Sri Aurobindo, Indian philosopher, yogi and nationalist
- Nagendranath Basu, historian and editor
- Shankar Abaji Bhise (1867–1935), scientist and inventor with 200 inventions and 40 patents. The American scientific community referred to him as the "Indian Edison".
- Jagadish Chandra Bose, Indian scientist
- Satyendra Nath Bose Known for his work on quantum mechanics, for developing the foundation of Bose statistics and the theory of the Bose condensate. The class of particles that obey Bose statistics, bosons, was named after Bose by Paul Dirac.
- Subhas Chandra Bose
- Mahadev Bhaskar Chaubal (1857–1933), Indian origin British era Chief Justice of the Bombay High Court. Member of Executive Council of Governor of Bombay in 1912 and Member of Royal Commission on Public Services in India.
- Har Dayal, Indian revolutionary and intellectual of the Ghadar party in the USA
- C. D. Deshmukh (1896–1982), first recipient of the Jagannath Shankarseth Sanskrit Scholarship, topper of ICS Examination, first Indian Governor of RBI, first finance Minister of independent India and tenth vice-chancellor of the University of Delhi
- Baji Prabhu Deshpande (1615–1660), commander of Shivaji Maharaj's forces who along with his brother died defending Vishalgad in 1660
- Murarbaji Deshpande (?–1665), commander of Shivaji Maharaj's forces who died defending the fort of Purandar against the Mughals in 1665
- Gayadhara (11th century), 11th century Indian Buddhist master and scholar from Vaishali in modern-day Bihar
- Jayaprakash Narayan (1902 -1979) - freedom fighter, social reformer and anti-corruption campaigner
- Bipin Chandra Pal, Indian nationalist, writer, orator, social reformer and Indian independence movement activist of Lal Bal Pal triumvirate
- Vithal Sakharam Parasnis (17xx-18xx)- Sanskrit, Vedic and Persian scholar; consultant to British Historian James Grant Duff; author of the Sanskrit "karma kalpadrum"(manual for Hindu rituals); first head of the school opened by Pratapsimha to teach Sanskrit to the boys of the Maratha caste
- Devdutt Pattanaik
- Premchand (1880–1936) – author in Hindi language
- Chandipat Sahay, Indian nobleman and politician
- Sachchidananda Sinha, lawyer prominent in the movement for establishing the state of Bihar
- Mahadevi Varma
- Bhagwati Charan Verma
- Swami Vivekananda
- Paramahansa Yogananda, author of Autobiography of a Yogi

== See also ==
- Muslim Kayasths
