= Bhatnagar =

Bhatnagar is a surname native to India, prevalent mainly among the Hindu Kayasthas.

== Notable people with the surname ==
- Arun Bhatnagar (born 1944), former Indian Administrative Service officer
- Arvind Bhatnagar (1936–2006), Indian astronomer; founder-director of the Udaipur Solar Observatory and the Nehru Planetarium of Bombay
- Deepti Bhatnagar (born 1967), Indian model and actor.
- Divya Bhatnagar (1986–2020), Indian television actress
- Gopal Bhatnagar, Canadian surgeon
- Jitendra Bhatnagar, Indian cricketer
- Kanta Kumari Bhatnagar (c. 1930–2011), Indian judge and human rights activist
- Mahendra Bhatnagar (1926–2020), Indian poet
- Prabhu Lal Bhatnagar (1912–1976), Indian mathematician known for Bhatnagar–Gross–Krook operator
- Rahul Bhatnagar (born 1959), Indian Administrative Service officer
- Ram Ratan Bhatnagar (1914–1992), Indian Hindi-language scholar and professor at University of Sagar
- S. K. Bhatnagar (1930–2001), former defence secretary of India
- Samiksha Bhatnagar (born 1988), Indian actress
- Seema Bhatnagar, Indian Women Scientist, working in the field of anticancer drug discovery.
- Shanti Swarup Bhatnagar (1894–1955), Indian scientist
- Shinjini Bhatnagar, Indian pediatric gastroenterologist
- Shivani Bhatnagar (died 1999), Indian Express journalist
- Shriya Saran Bhatnagar (born 1982), a.k.a. Shriya Indian model and actress
- Veena Bhatnagar, Fijian politician
- Vikram Bhatnagar (born 1970), Indian shooter
