= Saxena =

Saxena is an Indian surname primarily found in northern and Central India. It is a common surname found amongst the Chitraguptavanshi Kayastha (also known as North-Indian Kayastha) community of upper caste Hindus particularly in the Hindi-speaking regions of India. Saxena, in origin, is derived from the Sanskrit word sakhisena meaning “friend of the army”.

== Notables ==
- Abha Saxena (c. 1986–), bioethicist, global health specialist, and Coordinator of the Global Health Ethics Unit of the WHO in Geneva; wife of Shekhar
- Abhishek Saxena (born 1988), Indian Bollywood and Punjabi film director
- Akash Saxena (born 1975), Indian MLA for Uttar Pradesh
- Anuraag Saxena (c. 2016–), Indian activist, author, commentator and founder of the India Pride Project
- Anuj Saxena (born 1967), Indian actor, film producer and businessman
- Arvind Saxena (born 1955), Indian civil servant and former chairman of the Union Public Service Commission
- Arun Kumar Saxena (born 1948) Indian politician and physician who serves as the MLA for Bareilly and Minister of Environment, Forest & Climate Change
- Ashutosh Saxena (c. 2009–), Indian-American computer scientist, researcher, and entrepreneur
- Avadh Saxena (c. 1986–), American physicist and Group Leader of Physics of Condensed Matter and Complex Systems Group (T-4) at Los Alamos National Laboratory
- Banarsi Prasad Saxena (c. 1931; deceased), Indian historian associated with Allahabad University
- Girish Chandra Saxena (1928–2017), governor of Jammu and Kashmir
- Gopaldas Neeraj (1925–2018), Indian poet, author, and songwriter
- Gunjan Saxena (born 1975), Indian Air Force officer and helicopter pilot
- Harshit Saxena (born 1985), Indian singer and composer
- Harshita Saxena (c. 2008–), Indian model and beauty pageant titleholder
- Iresh Saxena (born 1984), Bengal cricketer
- Jalaj Saxena (born 1986), Indian cricketer
- Jatin Saxena (born 1982), Indian first-class cricketer
- K. P. Saxena (1932–2013), Hindi satirist and writer
- Krishna Gopal Saxena (1912–2003), Indian homoeopathic physician
- Manisha Saxena (born 1993), Indian model, actress, and television presenter
- N. C. Saxena (c. 1982–), Indian bureaucrat and member of the Planning Commission of India and the National Advisory Council
- Neelam Saxena Chandra (born 1969), Indian poet, author, and bureaucrat
- Neha Saxena (film actress) (c. 2012–), film and television actress
- Neha Saxena (TV actress) (c. 2009–), Indian television actress
- Nitin Saxena (born 1981), Indian mathematics and theoretical computer scientist
- Parag Saxena (born 1955), Indian-American investment manager, co-founder and general partner of Vedanta Capital, and CEO of New Silk Route
- PN Saxena (1925–1999), Indian academic, Founder Professor and Chairman of the Department of Pharmacology at Jawaharlal Nehru Medical College
- Poonam Kishore Saxena (born 1953), Indian Revenue Service officer and Chairperson of the Secretary of the Central Board of Direct Taxes
- Prem Behari Narain Raizada (1901–1966), Indian calligrapher who wrote the Constitution of India
- Rajan Saxena (management academic) (c. 1996–), Indian management expert, academic & writer
- Rajan Saxena (physician) (c. 2004–), Indian doctor and Dean and Head of Surgical Gastroenterology at Sanjay Gandhi Postgraduate Institute of Medical Sciences
- Rakesh Saxena (born 1952), Indian convicted criminal, financier and trader
- Ramesh Saxena (1944–2011), Indian cricketer
- Sapan Saxena (born 1985), Indian author and software engineer
- Sarveshwar Dayal Saxena (1927–1983), Indian writer, poet, columnist and playwright
- Saumitra Saxena (born 1976), Indian American poet
- Sharat Saxena (born 1950), Indian actor
- Shekhar Saxena (c. 1998–), Director of the Department of Mental Health and Substance Abuse at the World Health Organization; husband of Abha
- Shibban Lal Saxena (1906–1984), Indian politician and freedom fighter
- Sushil Kumar Saxena (c. 1988–), Indian musicologist, academic, scholar, and author
- Vijay Saxena (1968–1994), Indian actor
- Vinai Kumar Saxena (born 1958), Indian business executive, 4th Lieutenant Governor of Ladakh (2026–), and 22nd Lieutenant Governor of Delhi (2022–2026)
- Vineet Saxena (born 1980), Indian cricketer
- Veerendra Saxena (born 1960), Indian theatre, film, and television actor
- W. Hansraj Saxena (c. 1993–), CEO of the News J Channel and the former Deputy Managing Director of Sun Pictures
