= Anurag (disambiguation) =

Anurag is a common Indian given name.

Anurag may also refer to:

- Anuraag (1973 film), a Hindi film starring Rajesh Khanna and Nutan
- Advanced Numerical Research and Analysis Group, an Indian national defense laboratory in Hyderabad
- Anurag, Bangladesh

== See also ==
- Anuraag (disambiguation)
- Anuragam (disambiguation)
- Anuragi, a 1981 Indian film
