= Prem Behari Narain Raizada =

Writer of the poeter (1901-1966)

Prem Behari
- Born: 17 December 1901
- Died: 1966 (aged 64–65)
- Occupations: Calligrapher & Writer
- Known for: Hand-writing the Constitution of India

Prem Behari Narain Raizada (1901–1966) was an Indian calligrapher. He is notable for being the calligrapher who hand-wrote the Constitution of India.

== Biography ==
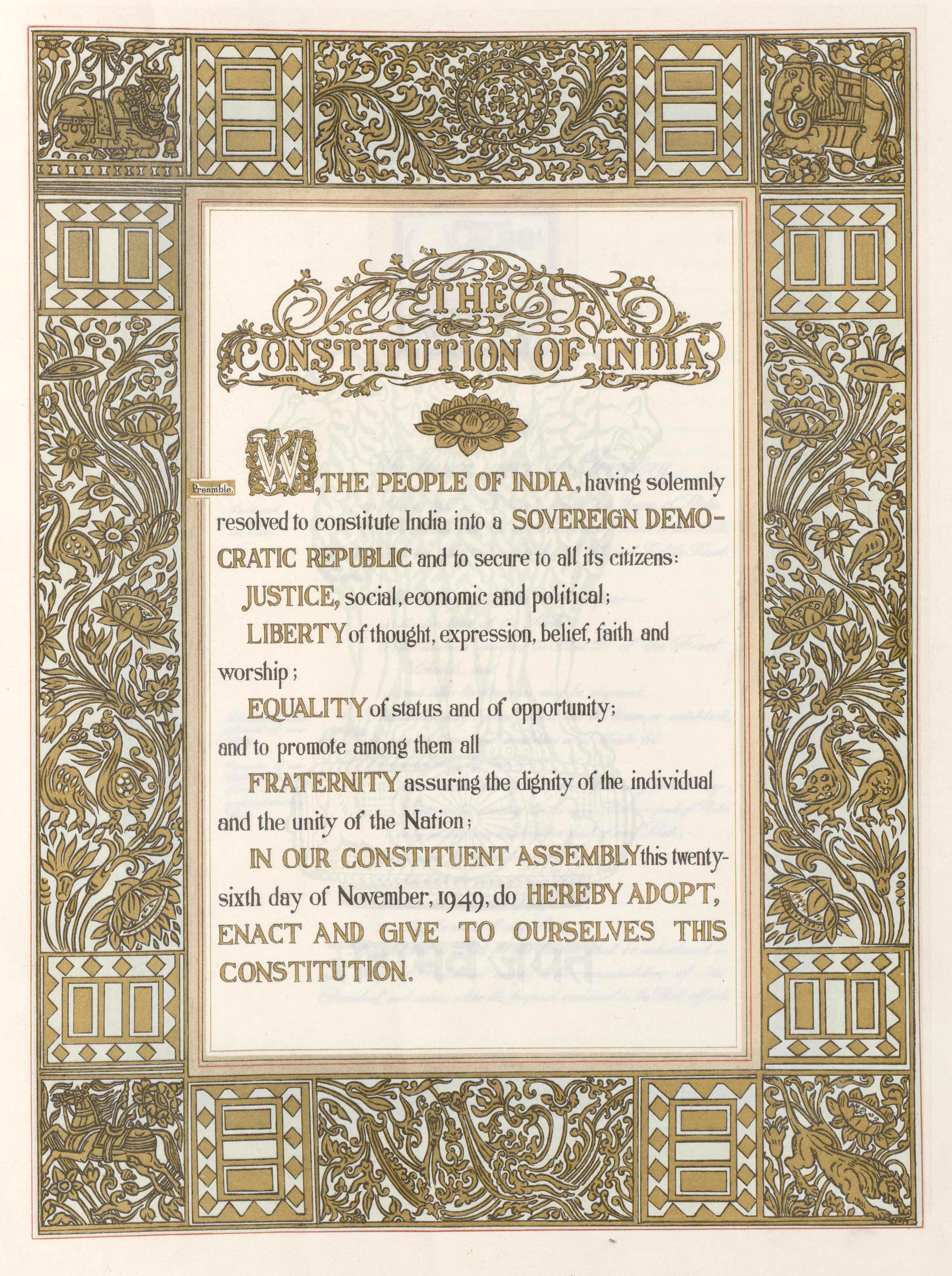
Preamble of the Constitution calligraphed by Prem Behari Narain Raizada

Prem Behari Narain Raizada was born in December 1901 to a Saxena Kayastha family of calligraphers. His mother and father both died when he was young and so Raizada was raised by his grandfather - himself a scholar of English and Persian - who would teach Raizada the art of Indian calligraphy. Raizada would go on to study at St. Stephen's College in Delhi, where he continued to refine his calligraphic skills.

When the Indian Constitution was being drafted by the Constituent Assembly of India in the late 1940s, Raizada was asked by Jawaharlal Nehru to write out the first copy of the seminal document. Asked what he would charge for hand-writing the constitution, Raizada replied,

“Not a single penny. By the grace of God I have all the things, and am quite happy with my life,”

“But I have one reservation—that on every page of Constitution I will write my name and on the last page I will write my name along with my grandfather’s name.”

Prem Behari Narain Raizada was the calligrapher of the Indian Constitution. The original constitution was written by him in a flowing italic style. The Calligraphy of the Hindi version of the Original Constitution was done by Vasant Krishan Vaidya. Working in a room in Constitution Hall (now known as the Constitution Club of India), Prem Behari Narain Raizada rendered the document - consisting of 395 articles, 8 schedules, and a preamble - over the course of six months. He incorporated his flowing style of calligraphy into the document, using hundreds of pen nibs in the course of his writing. The stipulation that he and his grandfather's names be added to the document was honored, and both names can be seen in the document. When it was completed, the manuscript was 251 pages and weighed 3.75 kg (8.26 lbs).

The manuscript was completed on 26 November 1949, and was signed on 26 January 1950.
