= Chitraguptavanshi Kayastha =

North Indian branch of Kayastha caste

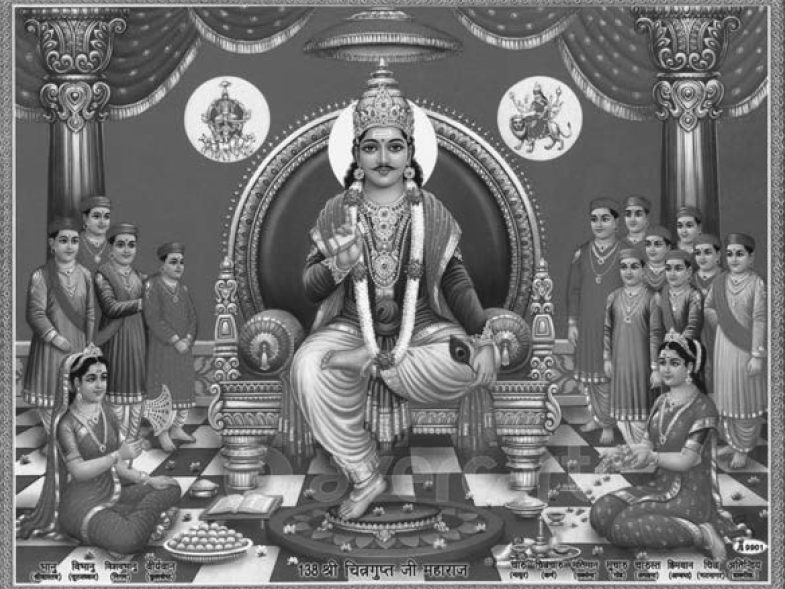
- King Chitragupta (Sri Chitragupta Ji Maharaj) and his 12 sons.
- Religions: Hinduism
- Languages: Hindi, Maithili, Angika
- Region: Hindi Belt and Nepal
- Subdivisions: Srivastava, Mathur, Saxena, Nigam, Kulshreshtha, Bhatnagar, Ambashtha, Asthana, Suryadhwaj, Gaur, Karna, Valmik

Chitraguptavanshi Kayastha, also referred to as North-Indian Kayastha, is a subgroup of Hindus of the Kayastha community that are mainly concentrated in the Hindi Belt of North India.

In Hindu texts and traditions, they are described to have descended from the Hindu god Chitragupta who is usually depicted carrying "a flowing notebook, a pen and an inkpot" engaged in writing down human deeds. They are further divided into twelve § Subgroups, each of which is claimed to be the progeny of Chitragupta's two consorts.

The earliest recorded history of these groups goes to the early medieval period of Indian history, while the word "Kayastha" itself dates to the third-century CE. The North Indian Kayasthas were powerful components of the upper-bureaucracy and made highly influential urban elites under Hindu kings. They are mentioned in several Sanskrit literary, religious and epigraphical texts.

Following Islamic invasions of India, they became some of the first Indian groups to learn Persian regularly and eventually became integrated into an Indo-Muslim governing community gaining hereditary control over the position of Qanungo (transl. "Registrar") but rarely converting to Islam.

Under the colonial rule, many Kayastha families became early beneficiaries of the British power and success in the subcontinent. In 1919, Kayasthas accounted for two-thirds of all Indian Government law members across north India, with most of them in the United Provinces.

== Etymology ==
According to Merriam-Webster, the word Kāyastha is probably formed from the Sanskrit kāya (body), and the suffix -stha (standing, being in). The suffix vanshi is derived from the Sanskrit word vansh (वंश) which translates to belonging to a particular family dynasty.

== History ==
=== Early North India ===
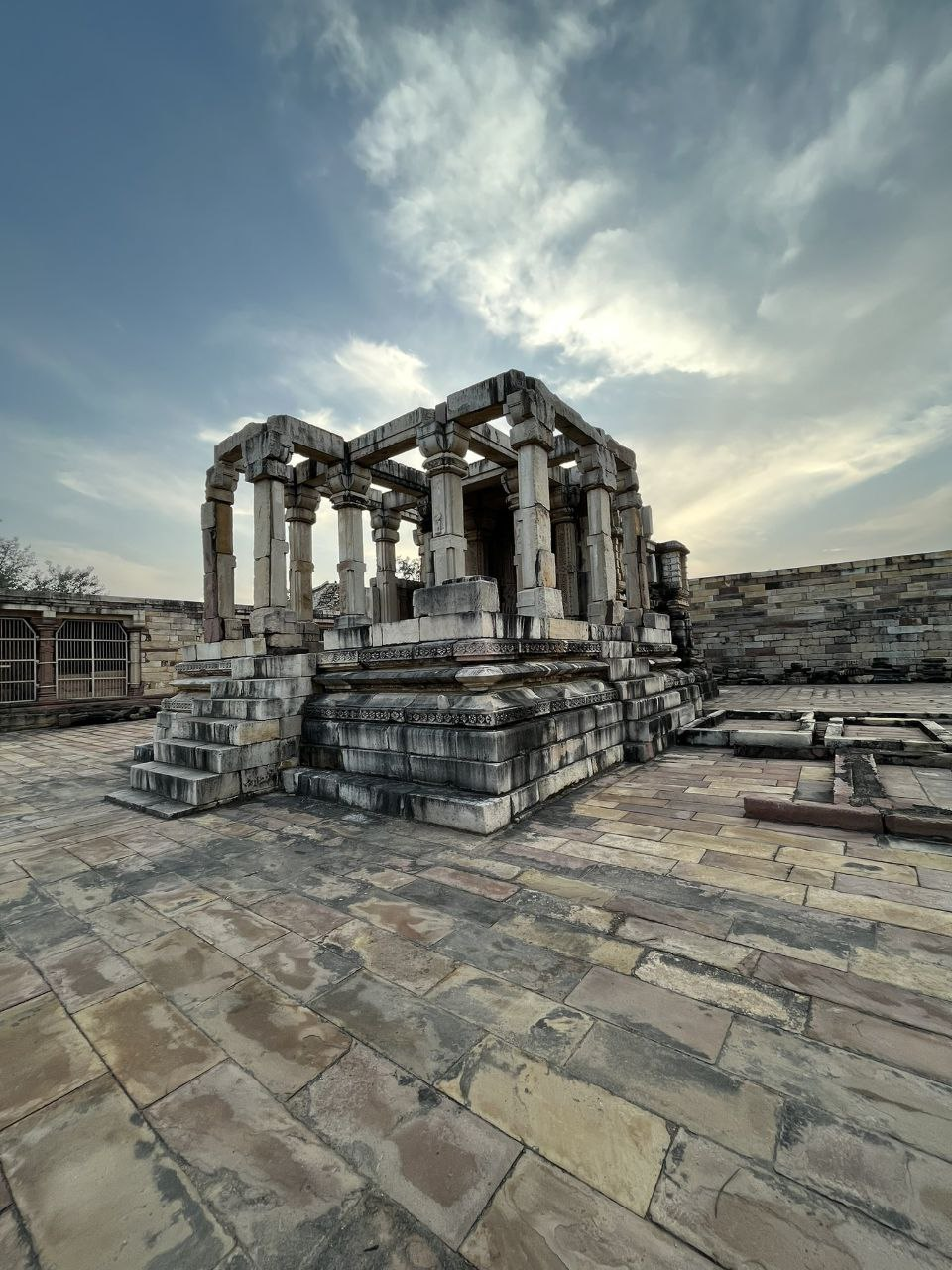
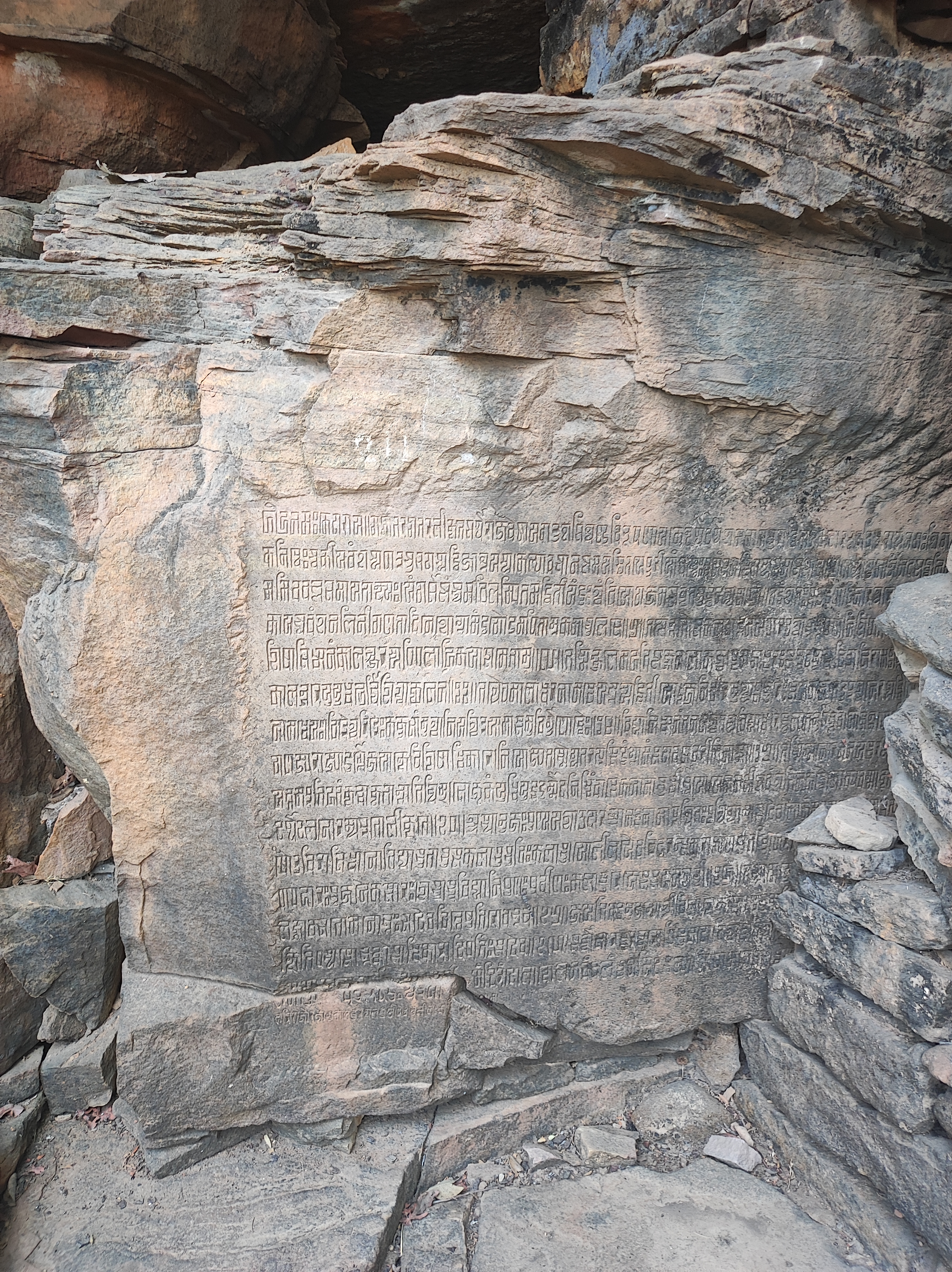
(Top): A temple in the Garhwa Fort complex at Prayagraj commissioned by a Vastavya-Kayastha Thakkura in 1142 CE.
(Bottom): Ajaygarh inscription of Chandelas of Jejakabhukti, recording the genealogy of Vastavya-Kayastha family that served in their kingdom as administrators.

From the eleventh-century onwards, epigraphical texts mention various regional lineages belonging to the North Indian branch of the Kayasthas, which were identified with their common occupational specialisation and whose members had become particularly influential in the administration of mediaeval kingdoms. Some Kayasthas even had feudatory status; some had received the title of Pandita for their extensive knowledge, while others, who were financially well-off, commissioned construction of temples. The earliest epigraphic mention of Chitragupta having any connection with the Chitraguptavanshi Kayasthas appears around the same period from a royal charter (dated 1115 CE) written by a Srivastava feudatory of Govindachandra of Kannauj. Similar epigraphic records mention Mathur feudatory of Udayasimha, and members of other Kayastha branches holding important administrative positions under different mediaeval kingdoms.

Kayasthas, according to Romila Thapar, had become a "powerful component of the upper-bureaucracy" and were on occasion "highly respected as royal biographers" and composers of inscriptions. Inviting them as professional scribes was considered an indicator of an established kingdom. Thapar also notes that "as recipients of office and holders of grants of land, brahmanas, kayasthas, and sreshtins (wealthy merchants)" were moving into a cultural circle which "attempted to diffuse a Sanskritic culture"

According to Chitrarekha Gupta, Kayasthas became "king-makers and the most influential urban elites".

=== Indo-Islamic Era ===
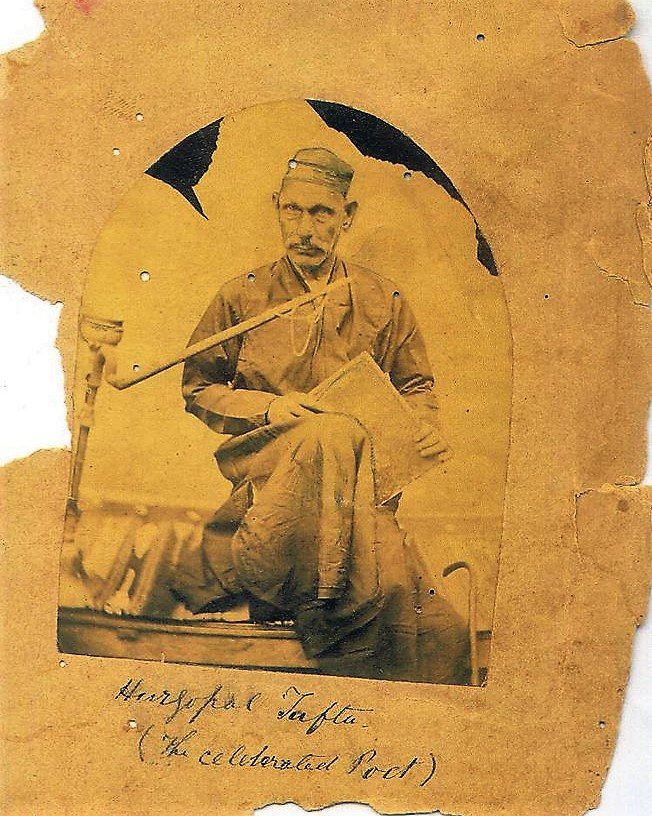
Munshi Hargopal Tafta (d. 1879) – the chief shagird (disciple) of Mirza Ghalib came from a Bhatnagar Kayastha family.

The rise of Timuri political power after the sixteenth century had the effect of opening new roles for Kayasthas. The North-Indian Kayasthas were some of the first groups to learn Persian regularly even before it became the court language. Kayasthas were a major demographic block in maktabs (equivalent of primary school) where they acquired skills of copying and writing, which were necessary for working in various Mughal departments. Thus, Kayasthas became conversant with and literate in wider Perso-Arabic fiscal lexicon and started to fulfil requirements of the Mughal administration as qanungos (transl. "Registrar") and patwaris (transl. "Accountant"). Kayasthas, according to Irfan Habib, were the "second layer" of revenue management in Mughal India, dealing with rudiments of revenue collection, land records, and paper management, where their basic Persian literacy and copying skills were put to use.

By the eighteenth century, Kayasthas' control of the qanungo position had essentially become hereditary.

Some Kayasthas were elevated to high ranking positions, such as Raghunath Ray Kayastha (d. 1664)—the Mughal Empire's "acting wazir" (transl. "Prime Minister") and finance minister, whom Emperor Aurangzeb regarded as the greatest administrator he had ever met, and Chandar Bhan Brahman referred to as the "frontispiece in the book of the men of the pen of Hindustan". Emperor Akbar's finance minister, Raja Todar Mal (born in Sitapur, Uttar Pradesh), is often referred to as a Kayastha. In fact, it was under Akbar's reign and Todar Mal's encouragement that most Kayasthas learnt Persian and were appointed as qanungos in the first place.

As their participation in Indo-Persian cultural forms grew, so did their interactions with Muslims, and the Kayasthas gradually became loosely integrated into an Indo-Muslim governing community. The North Indian Kayasthas, in contrast to CKPs and Bengali Kayasthas, became known for adopting an Indo-Muslim lifestyle, which was reflected in their attire, mannerism, and a common affinity for sharab (transl. wine) with Muslim aristocracy. To navigate the Indo-Muslim circle of service and literacy, many adopted Perso-Arabic pennames.

Table 1. Some Perso-Arabic pennames and titles adopted by North Indian Kayasthas
Name	Meaning
Raizada	Son of a king (Rais), or boss
Malik	Chief
Bakshi	Paymaster
Inamdar	The rewarded one
Qanungo	Of the law/custom/registrar
Daftri	Office-person
Daulatzada	Son of authority
Umid	Hope
Gulab	Rosewater
Daulat	Wealth
Fateh	Victory
Farhad	Happiness

The ulama, Muslim aristocracy, and Persian poets, on the other hand, looked down on Kayasthas for wielding influence, labelling them "disloyal, cruel, cheats, and extortionists". According to Ayesha Jalal, unless it was a full-fledged conversion some Muslims kept Hindus 'at a figurative and literal arm's length'. One Muslim commentator noted that the Hindu pensman who spoke Persian was a 'neo-Muslim, but still retained [sic] the smell of kufr [infidelity] and discord in his heart'. The Muslim reformer Shah Waliullah once complained that 'all [of India's] accountants and clerks [are] Hindus...they control [sic] the country's wealth'. Kayasthas had to try and convince Muslims that they did not represent infidelity in Islam, as ulama claimed. Many Kayasthas left their sacred thread (suta) at home when Emperor Aurangzeb made it illegal to wear it at court.

Most Kayasthas remained pragmatic and vocationally oriented towards their Persian language skills, probably with the exception of Munshi Hargopal Tufta (d. 1879), the chief shagird (transl. "disciple") of Mirza Ghalib. They also remained largely reluctant and rarely converted to Islam which, according to H. Bellenoit, limited their "administrative worth". Those who did convert maintained traditions of accountancy and paper-management, and are known as Muslim Kayasthas, a numerically small community of northern India.

==== Under Nawabs of Awadh ====
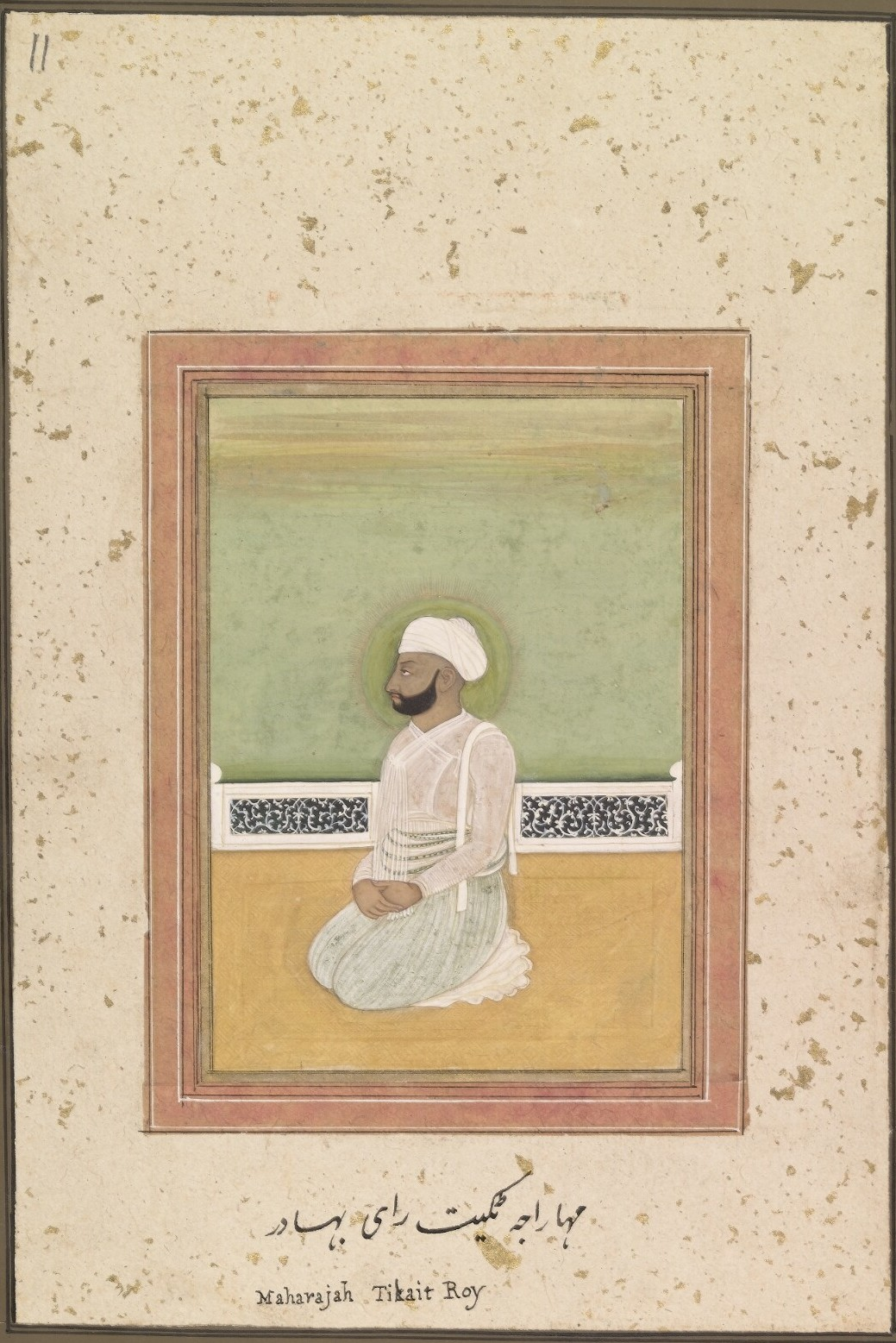
Maharaja Tikait Rai, the Kayastha Diwan of Oudh (d. 1801)

The Kayastha's association with the Nawab's began early with Nawal Ray (d. 1750), a Saxena Kayastha from Etawah. In 1748, Safdar Jang made him deputy governor over Allahabad and he was awarded the title of first Raja and then of Maharaja. Nawal died on the battlefield fighting against Pathans on behalf of Safdar

Under the reign of Asaf-ud-Daula, the Kayastha Raja Tikait Rai who served as a Diwan (transl. "Finance Minister") became an important figure in the region's administration. After him a number of Kayastha administrators such as Raja Jhau Lal, Raja Gulab Rai, Munshi Hardayal, Trilok Chand Bakshi, Raja Jiya Lal and several others made important contributions in administration and cultural activities of Awadh.

In some areas, Kayasthas were more willing to embrace outward signs of a spiritual orientation that was almost Islamic. Many were active members of Sufi shrines and frequently attended in Shia spiritual months of Muharram and Ashura. In 1780s Lucknow, thousands of Kayastha worked as calligraphers who had mastered the Persian works of Hafez and Sadi.

Shiva Dasa 'Lakhnavi', a Kayastha from Awadh, authored his monumental work Shahnama Munawar Kalam in Persian, which provides account of events, political upheavals and factional struggles from the time of Emperor Farrukhsiyar (1712 CE) to Emperor Muhammad Shah's fourth regnal year (1723 CE).

==== Bhakti movement ====
The Kayasthas also became a part of the larger Bhakti movement in northern India.

Dhruvadasa (d. 1643), a Kayastha from Deoband (Uttar Pradesh), whose family served as government servants, is considered one of the Radhavallabh sect's foremost poets. Another Kayastha Ghanananda (d. 1739), who served as the Mughal Emperor Muhammad Shah's Mir Munshi (transl. "Chief Scribe"), renounced his worldly life and remained in Vrindavan until he was killed by soldiers of Ahmad Shah Abdali. He is regarded as one of the finest Braj Bhasha poets. The most important contribution came from Lalach Kavi, a Kayastha from Raebareli, who in 1530 CE wrote the first ever Hindi vernacular adaptation of the Sanskrit text Bhagavata Purana's "Dasam Skandha".

=== British Raj ===
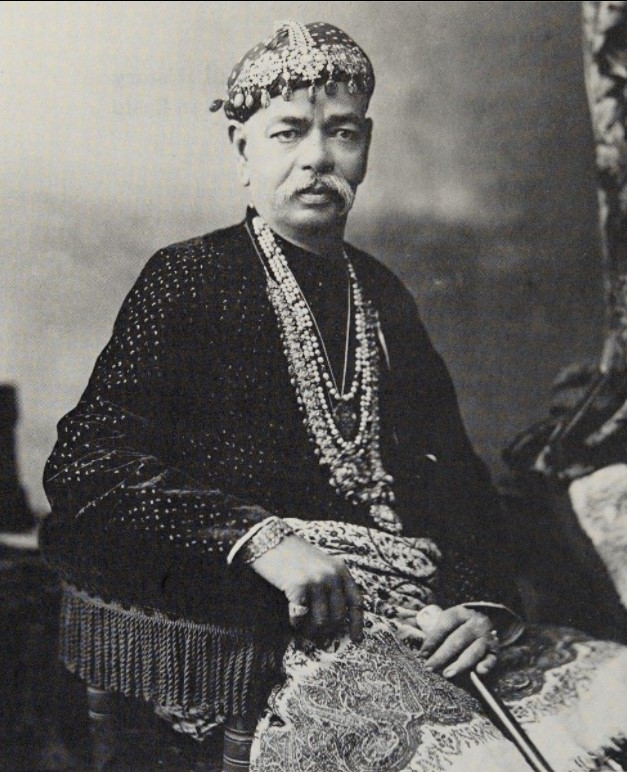
Raja Girdhari Pershad c. 1890: A Kayastha who supervised household and military units for Nizam of Hyderabad

By the 1820s, the East India company's agrarian taxation had built upon a network of paper-managers that reached back into the Late Mughal era. The registrars and accountants provided important information on "rents, assessments and methods of negotiating rent rates". In the Great rebellion triggered by the annexation of Awadh in 1856, many old Nawabi fiscal records were destroyed in Lucknow and Faizabad. Kayastha qanungos and scribes proved to be of great help in achieving fiscal consolidation and integration of the region into north Indian administration. And in this sense, Kayasthas became well-known in the colonial officialdom and it was observed that:

Hindoos of the Kyut [Kayastha] caste are always to be preferred for this duty...generally speaking [they] are respectable, well-dressed and intelligent, and carry much weight with them on entering a village, assuming great consequence, and summoning the village authorities to attend with a great deal of parade and show...he never appears without a bearer holding a chattah (umbrella) over his head.

The early colonial administration, thus, came to be shaped by influential Kayastha families who became early beneficiaries of the British power and success. In 1919, at the cusp of Congress's launch of Civil Disobedience, Kayasthas accounted for two-thirds of all Indian Government law members across north India, with most of them in the United Provinces. One famous Gaur Kayastha, Brij Bhukhan Lal, became the first Indian to hold the post of Registrar Judicial in Oudh.

==== Kayastha Samachar ====
Munshi Kali Prasad, who also founded the Kayastha Pathshala, commenced the publication of an Urdu journal – the Kayastha Samachar. It gained recognition among Indian periodicals and was invited to the Delhi Darbar in 1903. Its language was subsequently changed to English whereas name to Hindustan Review and Kayastha Samachar and later Hindustan Review. By 1904, the circulation of the Hindustan Review and Kayastha Samachar was the largest of any Indian monthly.

==== Controversies ====
In the 1880s, Allan Octavian Hume called for the colonial government to:

tax the... Kayasths... who, while growing rich by the pen, oust their betters from their ancestral holdings, and then are too great cowards to wield a sword either to protect their own acquisitions or to aid the Government which has fostered their success.

As part of the British divide and rule strategy, in 1901, the Principal of Queens College received a directive from the Commissioner of Benares and its District Collector that candidates for the Collector's office should "belong to castes other than Kayasthas." Thus, making room for Brahmins and other castes.

==== Census of India (1931) ====
According to census of India of 1931, Chitraguptavanshi Kayasthas were the most literate caste group in United Provinces of Agra and Oudh. Around 70% of Kayastha males aged 7 years and over and 19% females were literate.

Table 2. Approximate literacy rates of different caste groups according to 1931 census of India in the United Provinces, British India.
Caste	Male literacy (%)	Female literacy (%)
Kayastha	70	19
Vaishya	38	6
Sayyid	38	9
Bhumihar	31	3
Brahmin	29	3
Mughal	26	5
Pathan	15	2

=== Modern India ===
Modern scholars categorise them among Indian communities that were traditionally described as "urban-oriented", "upper caste" and part of the "well-educated" pan-Indian elite, alongside Khatris, Kashmiri Pandits, Parsis, Nagar Brahmins of Gujarat, South-Indian Brahmins, Deshastha Brahmins, Chitpavan Brahmin, Prabhu Kayasthas, Bhadralok Bengalis and upper echelons of the Muslim and Christian communities that made up the middle class at the time of Indian independence in 1947.

== Varna status ==
The functionality of the Kayasthas, who identified themselves with "Chitragupta and paper-oriented service", was more significant before the 1870s, and historically, their caste status have been ambiguous. Kayasthas of northern India regard themselves as a de facto varna that arose to keep records of the four varnas that came before them. Traditions and occupations associated with them, and their belief in the mythical roles assigned to Chitragupta, their progenitor, partly support this claim.

== Social status ==
By 1900, the Kayasthas became so dominant as a 'service caste' that "their ability to mould north India's governance led to numerous calls from British officialdom to cut their numbers down". The late-nineteenth-century ethnographers and observers unanimously agreed on the Kayastha's high social status in the Hindu society.

They are recognised as a Forward Caste, as they do not qualify for any of the reservation benefits allotted to Scheduled Castes and Scheduled Tribes and Other Backward Classes that are administered by the Government of India.

== Society and culture ==
Chitraguptavanshi Kayasthas are primarily divided into twelve subgroups. These subgroups have traditionally practised endogamy within their subgroup. H. Bellenoit has shown that these subgroups tended to reside in certain geographic areas of Hindustan.

=== Subgroups ===
				Chitragupta progenitor
	Nandini wife						Shobhavati wife
Bhanu; Srivastava	Vibhanu; Suryadhwaj	Vishavbhanu; Nigam	Viryavan; Kulshrestha	Charu; Mathur	Chitracharu; Karna	Chitraksha; Bhatnagar	Sucharu; Gaur	Charusta; Ashthana	Himvan; Ambashtha	Matiman; Saxena	Atindaya; Valmik

=== Writing system ===
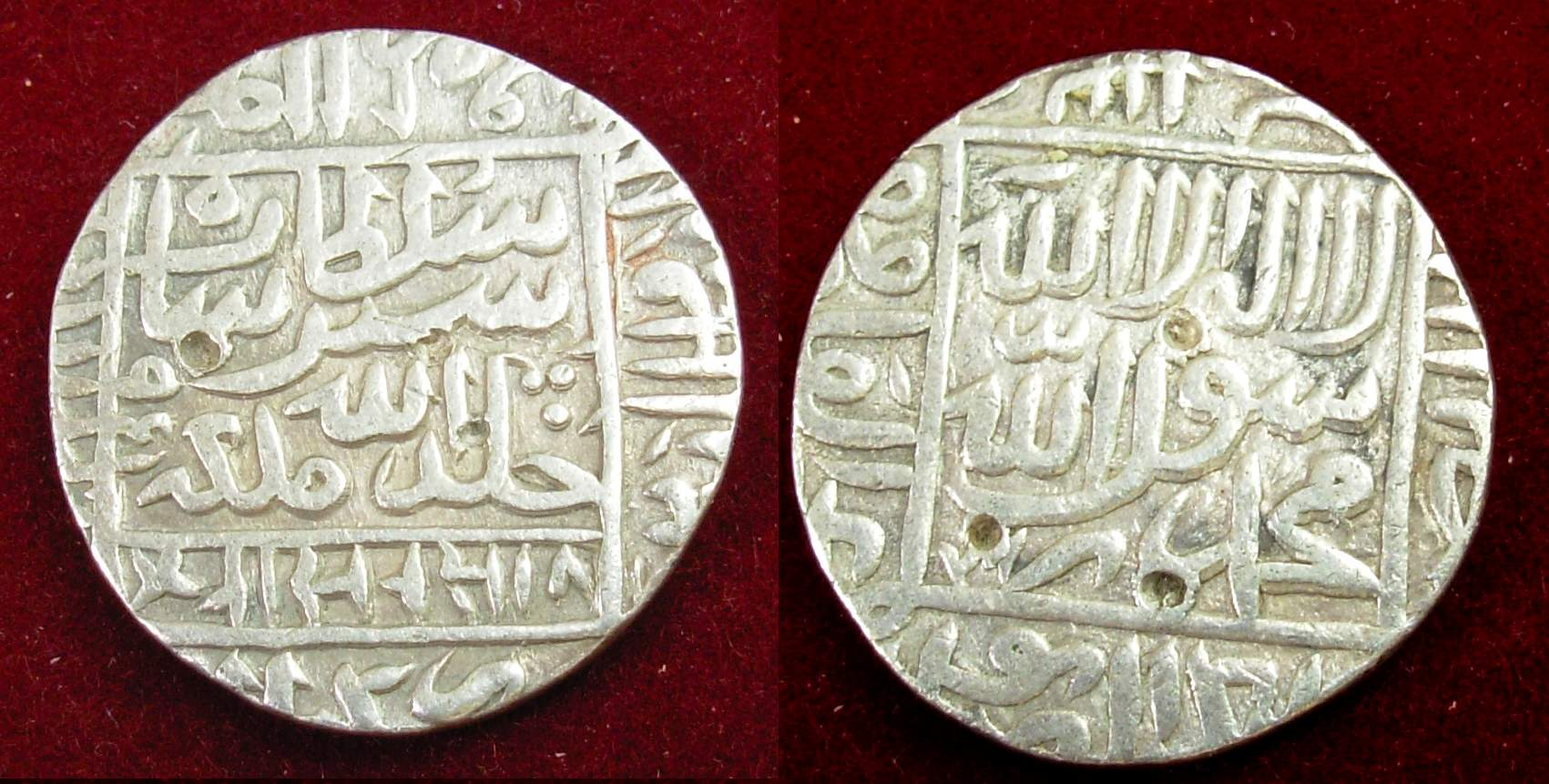
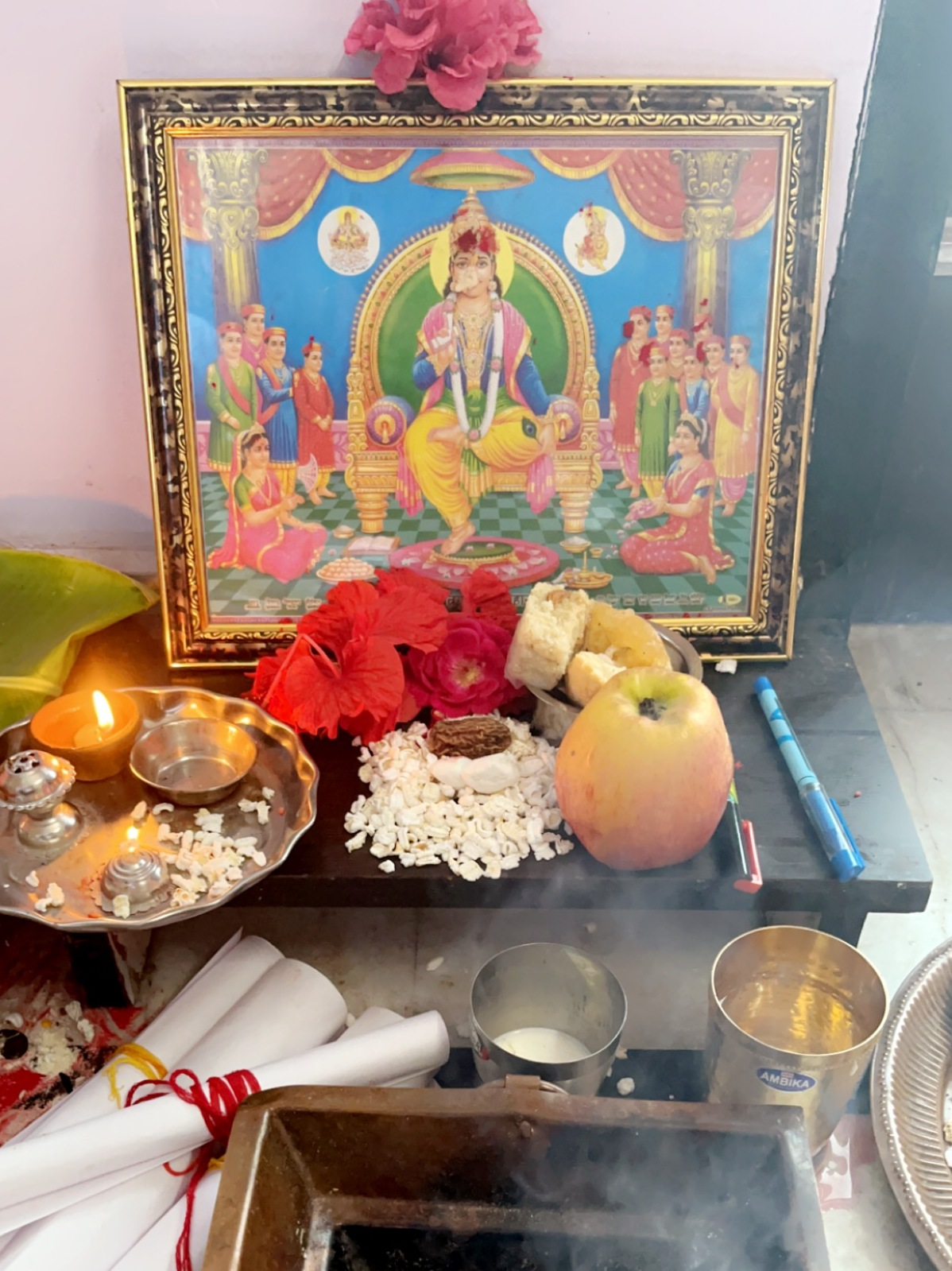
Top: Kaithi script (left side bottom most line) on the coins of Sher Shah Suri; Bottom: Chitragupta Puja rituals that involve venerating the pen and paper.

Kaithi is a historical Brahmic script that was used widely in parts of Northern India especially Awadh and Bihar. The script derives its name from the word "Kayastha". Documents in Kaithi are traceable to at least the 16th century. The script was widely used during the Mughal period.

Under the British Raj, the script was recognised as the official script of the law courts in some provinces. John Nesfield in Oudh, George Campbell in Bihar and a committee in Bengal all advocated for the use of the script in education.

=== Women ===
Traditionally, the North Indian Kayastha women were allowed to attend school and receive education, but were kept in "far more seclusion than the Rajput women," according to a Colonial era census report. Some patriarchs of the caste also seemed to have kept concubines.

A 2015 survey at a District Court revealed that the Kayastha caste appeared to have produced the most female lawyers overall. The Kayastha caste, unlike the majority of other castes in Indian society, typically relies on employment rather than land, hence both men and women in this caste marry after obtaining professional qualifications. The Kayastha women consequently marry at an older-than-average age.

=== Festivals ===
Beside celebrating all major Hindu festivals, Kayasthas also celebrate Chitragupta Puja around the festival of Diwali. The rituals symbolise veneration towards the pen, paper, ink-pot and Chitragupta that are considered indispensable part of the Kayastha heritage.

=== Diet and cuisine ===
Kayasth cuisine focuses a great deal on meat – in fact, most vegetables in the Kayastha menu are prepared the same way as meat. Yet traditionally meat eating is often limited to public sphere as Kayasthas tend to consume vegetarian cuisine at home.

=== Education and Literacy ===
According to the last completed census of India of 1931, Chitraguptavanshi Kayasthas were the most literate caste group in United Provinces of Agra and Oudh. Around 70% of Kayastha males aged 7 years and over and 19% females were literate.

Table 2. Approximate literacy rates of different caste groups according to 1931 census of India in the United Provinces, British India.
Caste	Male literacy (%)	Female literacy (%)
Kayastha	70	19
Vaishya	38	6
Sayyid	38	9
Bhumihar	31	3
Brahmin	29	3
Mughal	26	5
Pathan	15	2

== Notables ==
Prominent Kayastha Figures
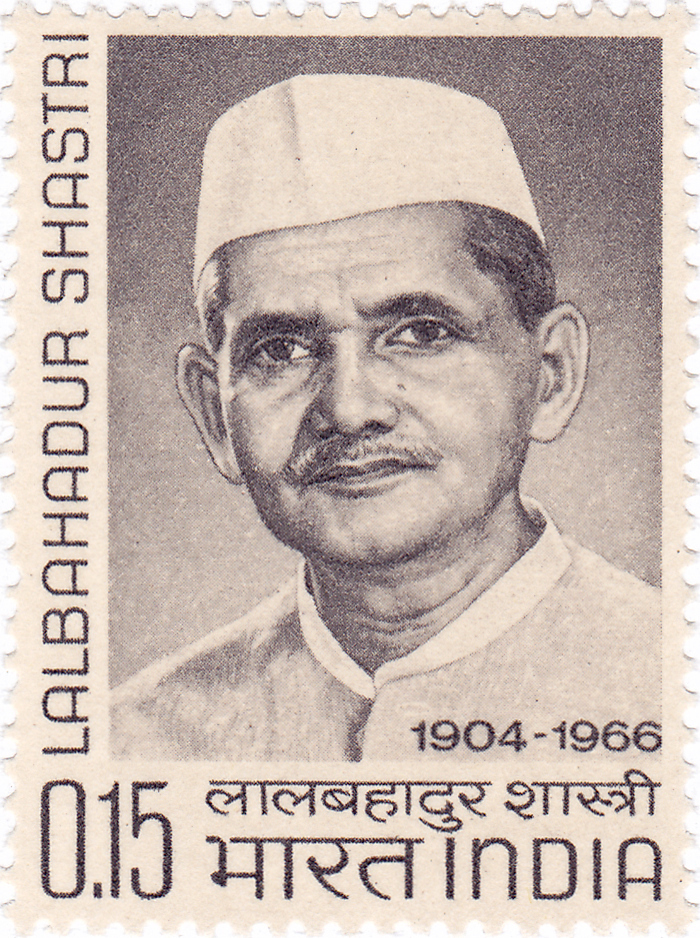
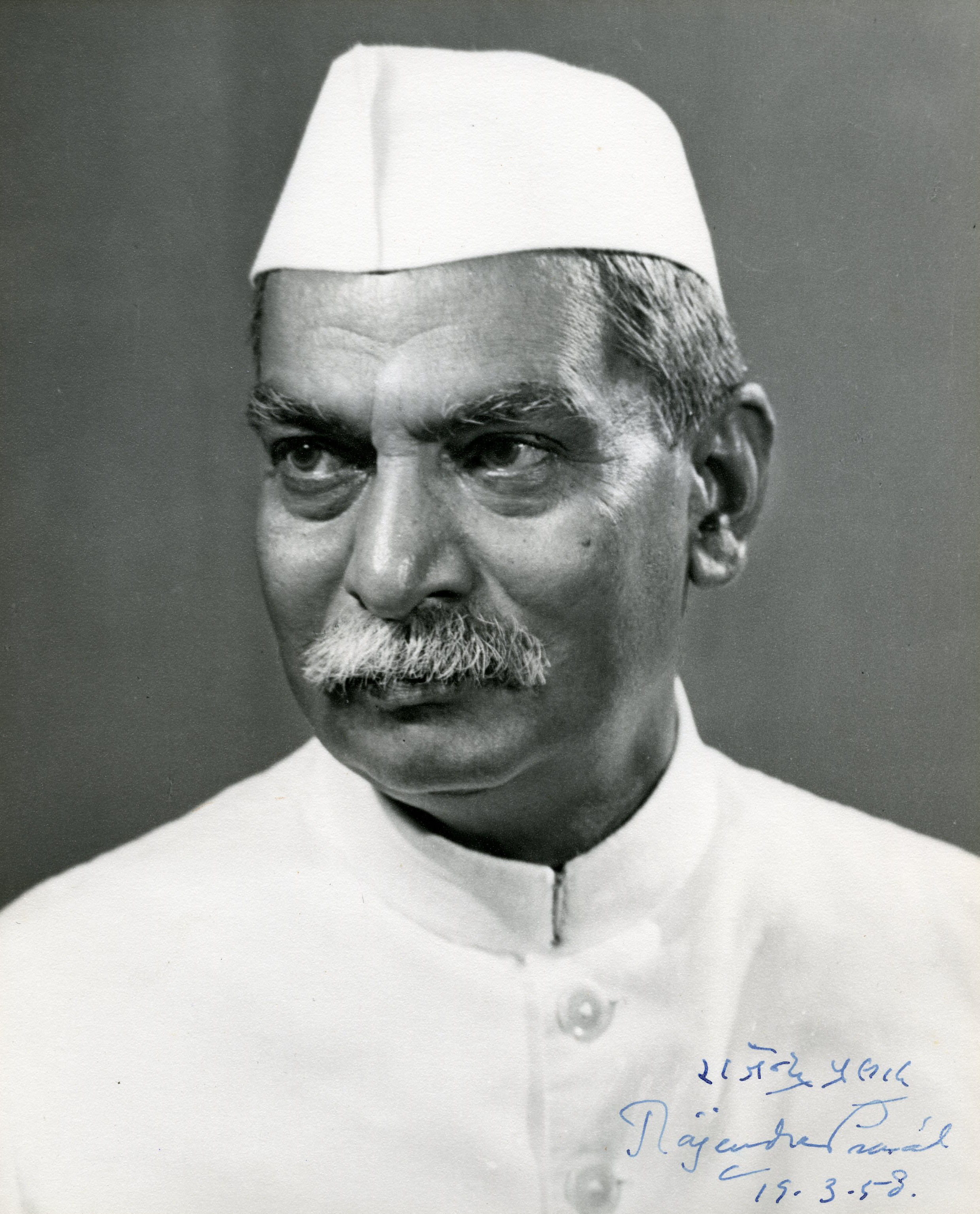
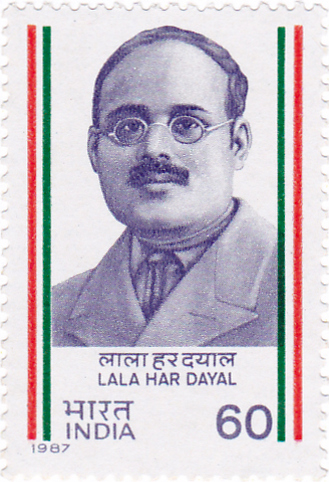
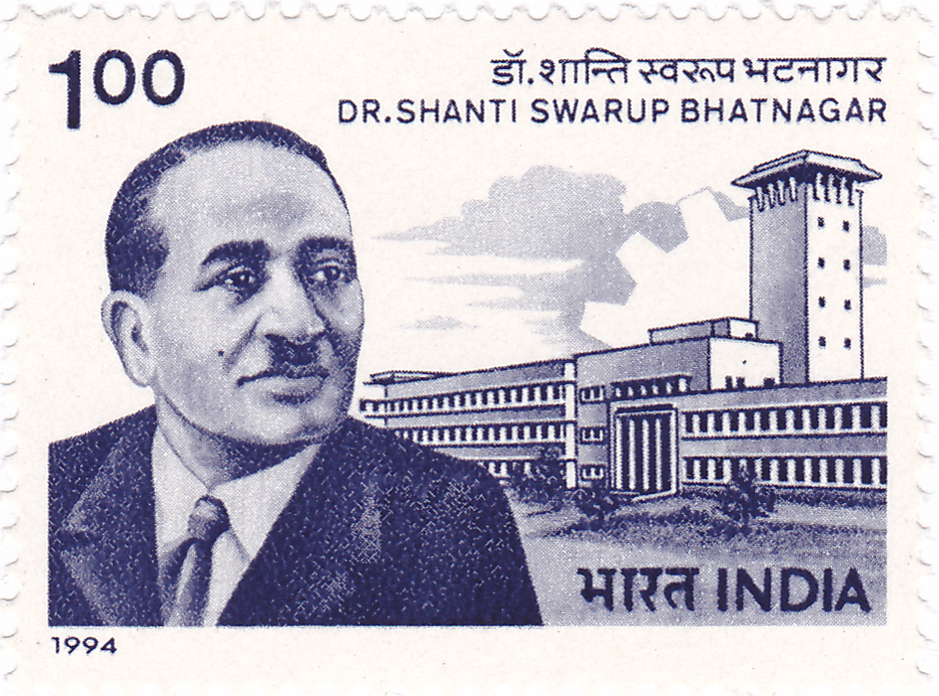
(From Left to Right) Lal Bahadur Shastri, Rajendra Prasad, Premchand, Lala Har Dayal, Shanti Swaroop Bhatnagar

=== Politicians and revolutionaries ===
- Yashwant Sinha
- Krishna Ballabh Sahay
- Chandipat Sahay
- Mahamaya Prasad Sinha
- Sachchidananda Sinha
- Subodh Kant Sahay
- Jayaprakash Narayan
- Rajendra Prasad
- Shyam Nandan Sahay
- Shailendra Nath Shrivastava
- Lal Bahadur Shastri
- Shiv Charan Mathur
- Sampurnanand
- Ravi Shankar Prasad
- Nitin Nabin
- Jayant Sinha
- Har Dayal
- Pandey Ganpat Rai
- Sidharth Nath Singh
- Hari Krishna Shastri
- Sunil Shastri

=== Literature ===
- Premchand
- Harivansh Rai Bachchan
- Firaq Gorakhpuri
- Mahadevi Varma
- Bhagwati Charan Verma
- Dharamvir Bharati
- Ramkumar Verma
- Saumitra Saxena
- Parichay Das (Professor, Nava Nalanda Mahavihar University, Nalanda)

=== Science and Technology ===
- Shanti Swaroop Bhatnagar
- Vinod Dham
- Harish Chandra Verma
- Ganesh Prasad

=== Actors and artists ===
- Mukesh
- Raju Srivastav
- Amitabh Bachchan
- Mini Mathur
- Sonu Nigam
- Aadesh Shrivastava

== See also ==
- Chandraseniya Kayastha Prabhu
- Karan Kayastha
- Bengali Kayastha

== Bibliography ==
1. Sinha, Ranjit K. (2014). The Kayastha Caste of India: Antiquity, Tradition and Modernity. Patna, Bihar: Indo books. ISBN 9789350741139.
2. Prasad, K.; LLC, Books (2018). The Kayastha Ethnology, an Enquiry Into the Origin of the Chitraguptavansi and Chandrasenavansi Kayasthas. Creative Media Partners. pp. 34–69, 75–78. ISBN 9780343919894.
