= Anuraag =

Anuraag may refer to:

Indian cinema

- Anuraag (1956 film), see Bollywood films of 1956
- Anuraag (1971 film), see Bollywood films of 1971
- Anuraag (1972 film)

People

- Anuraag Saxena, Indian activist, author and commentator
- Anuraag Singhal, Indian-American judge

== See also ==
- Anurag (disambiguation)
- Anuragam (disambiguation)
- Anuraagi, a 1988 Indian film
