= Nilima =

Nilima is an Indian female given name and may refer to:

- Nilima Arun Kshirsagar, Indian clinical pharmacologist
- Nilima Ghose, Indian athlete
- Nilima Ibrahim, Bangladeshi educationist, littérateur and social worker
- Nilima Jogalekar, Indian cricketer
- Nilima Nigam, Indian and Canadian mathematician and mathematical physiologist
- Nilima Sen, Rabindrasangeet singer
- Nilima Sheikh, Indian artist

== See also ==
- Neelima, alternative form of the name
- Neeloo, Nilima, Nilofar, a 2000 Hindi novel by Indian writer Bhisham Sahni
