= Raja Tikait Rai =

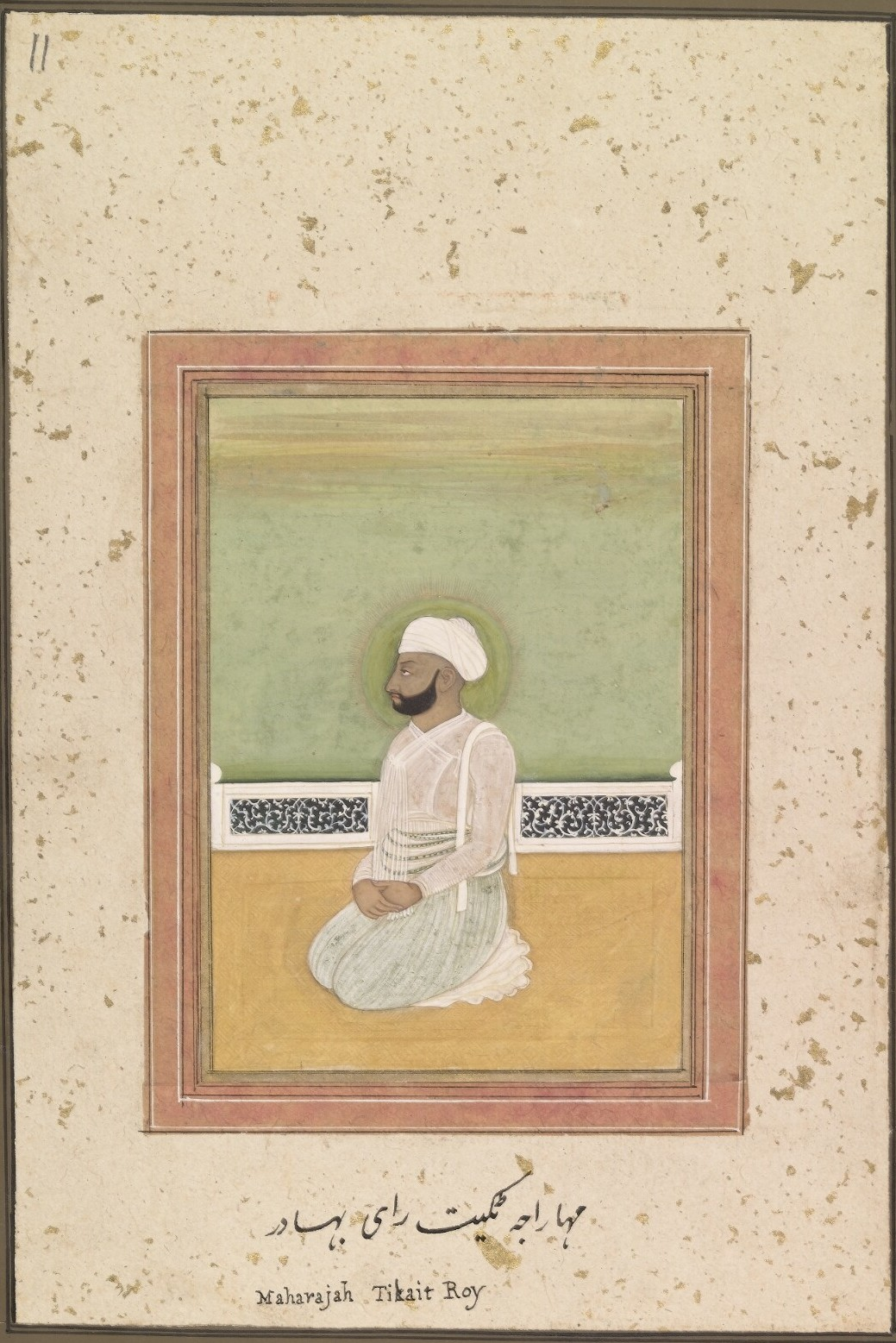
Portrait dated to the 18th century

Raja Tikait Rai Srivastava" (c. 1760–1808) was the Diwan (transl. "Finance Minister") of Awadh from 1791 - 1796 CE in the regime of Asaf-ud-Daula. He belonged to North Indian Kayastha community of India.

== Famine of 1784-85 ==
Nawab Asif-ud-daula along with his prime minister Mirza Hasan Raza Khan and deewan Raja Tikait Rai, established a charitable institution (Rifah-e-Aam) which provided relief to thousands. Asif-ud-daula distributed salaries to the people with finance minister Raja Jhau Lal and deewan Raja Tikait Rai .

== Welfare construction ==
He also constructed many temples, mosques, bridges and dug tanks all over the state, which can still be seen. He also built imambaras to house alams. In Tehsil Bithur, Kanpur there is a Baradari and a bathing quay built of red stone on the banks of Ganges known as Patthar ghat, built by Raja Tikait Rai.

Raja Tikait was also named the royal yajmān (patron) of Hanuman Garhi in Ayodhya as a result of his donations.

== In memory ==
Raja Tikait Rai Ka Talab - This was built by the Nawabs. It is a pucca talab/tank with a separate bathing ghat for women. It also has the Sitala Mata temple where an annual fair is organized.

== Notes ==
- Repertoire On Wajid Ali Shah & Monuments of Avadh, Avadh Cultural Club, Lucknow, 1974
