= Anuragam =

Anuragam or Anuraagam may refer to:

== Film ==
- Anuragam, a 1963 Telugu film produced by D. Ramanaidu
- Anuragam, a 1978 Sri Lankan Tamil film directed by Yasapalitha Nanayakkara
- Anuraagam, a 2002 Malayalam film written by P. A. Thomas, and starring Sathaar
- Anuragam (film), a 2023 Malayalam film starring Aswin Jose and Gouri Kishan

== Music ==
- "Anuraagam", by K. J. Yesudas, from the film Kalpana, 1970
- "Anuragam", by V. Ramakrishna and S. Janaki, from the film Maa Iddari Katha, 1977
- "Anuragam", by Surmukhi Raman and K. K. Nishad, from the film Vaadamalli, 2011
- "Anuragam", by Rahul Subrahmanian, from the film Thattathin Marayathu, 2012
- "Anuragam", by Manjari, 2015

== Television ==
- Anuragam, a 2020 series that aired on Mazhavil Manorama

== See also ==
- Anuraag (disambiguation)
- Anurag (disambiguation)
- "Anuragam Anuragam", song by Hariharan and Sujatha from the film Bava Nachadu, 2001
- "Anuraagam Anuraagam", song by K. J. Yesudas from the film Missi, 1976
