= Nigam =

Nigam is a subcaste of Chitraguptavanshi Kayastha.

== Notable people ==
- Abhishek Nigam (Actor)
- Nilima Nigam, Indian-Canadian mathematician
- Satish Nigam (Politician)
- Shraddha Nigam (Actor)
- Siddharth Nigam (Actor)
- Sonu Nigam (Singer)
- Teesha Nigam (Singer)
- Vipraj Nigam (Cricketer)
