= Avadh Saxena =

American physicist

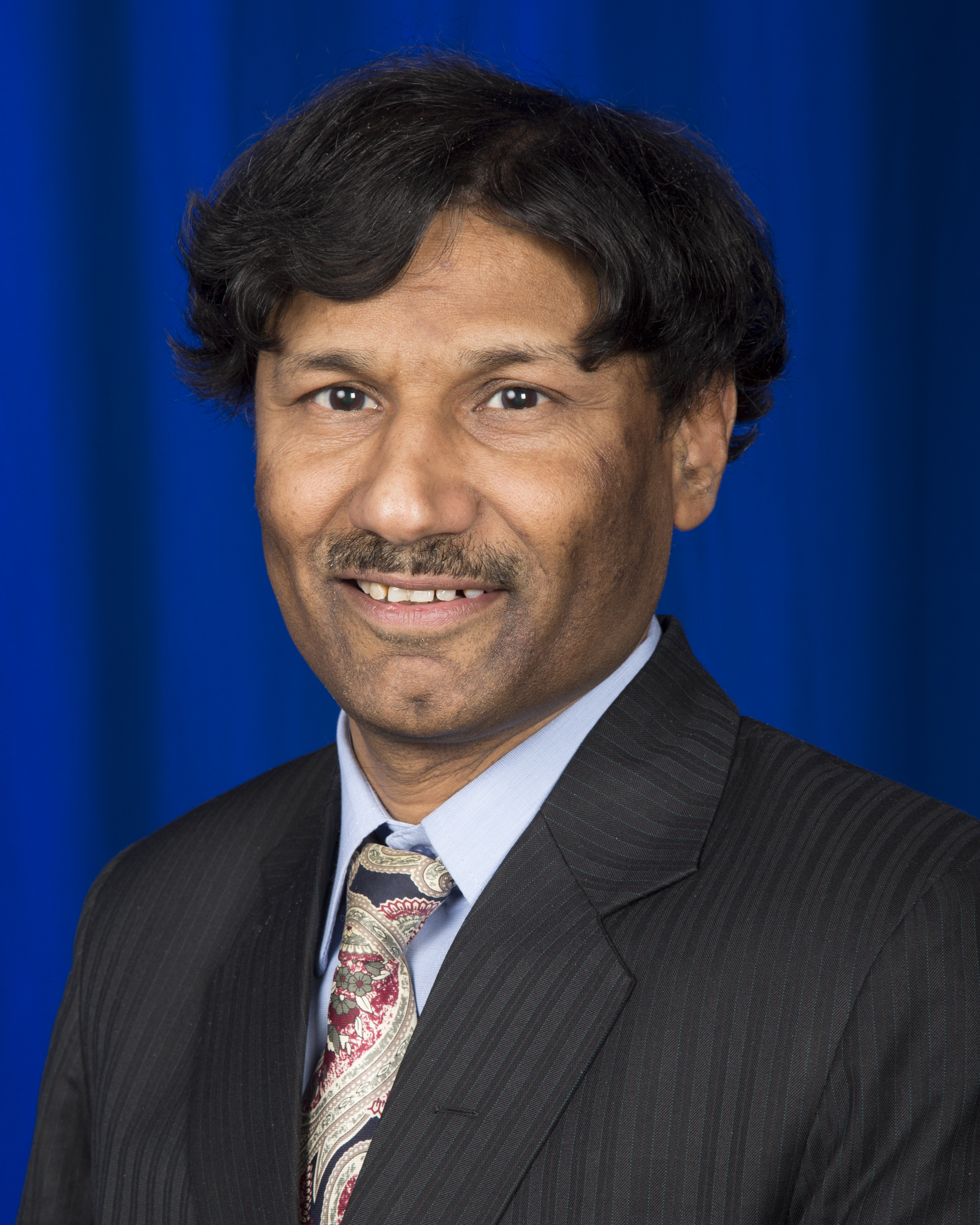
- Born: India
- Scientific career
- Fields: Condensed matter physics/material physics, quantum physics, nonlinear science
- Institutions: Los Alamos National Laboratory; KTH Royal Institute of Technology, Stockholm; University of Barcelona
- Doctoral advisor: James D. Gunton

Avadh B. Saxena is an American physicist and the former Group Leader of Physics of Condensed Matter and Complex Systems Group (T-4) at Los Alamos National Laboratory, New Mexico, United States. His contributions cover a range of topics including phase transitions, functional materials, topological defects such as solitons and skyrmions, and Non-Hermitian quantum mechanics. Saxena completed his PhD at Temple University in 1986 (advisor: James D. Gunton). Subsequently, he held a joint postdoc position at the Materials Research Lab at Penn State (with Gerhard R. Barsch) and Cornell University (with James A. Krumhansl). In 1990 he came to Los Alamos National Laboratory as a visiting scientist/consultant to the Theoretical Division (with Alan R. Bishop), and in 1993 became a Technical Staff Member. In January 2006 he assumed the Deputy Group Leader position of the Condensed Matter and Statistical Physics Group (formerly T-11) and from 2009 to 2024, he was the Group Leader of T-4. He is currently also an affiliate professor at the KTH Royal Institute of Technology, and adjunct professor at the University of Barcelona, University of Crete, Greece, Virginia Tech, and University of Arizona, and scientific advisor at the National Institute for Materials Science at Tsukuba, Japan. He is a Fellow of Los Alamos National Laboratory, a Fellow of the American Physical Society (APS), and a member of the Sigma Xi Scientific Research Society, American Ceramic Society and APS.

== Academic career ==
Avadh has more than 525 publications and has co-edited 6 Springer books in addition to several special journal issues. He has recently written a book on the topic of phase transitions in materials (Cambridge University Press). In addition, he has co-organized about 60 international conferences on various research topics.

His main research interests include phase transitions, optical, electronic, vibrational, transport and magnetic properties of functional materials, device physics, soft condensed matter, geometry, topology and nonlinear phenomena. Recently he has been coordinating theoretical efforts at LANL in the context of Beyond Moore's Law quantum computing.

Saxena completed his PhD at the Temple University in 1986 under the supervision of James D. Gunton. In 1990 he was a visiting scientists at Los Alamos National Laboratory, becoming a Technical Staff Member in 1993. He is an affiliate professor at the KTH Royal Institute of Technology, and adjunct professor at the University of Barcelona, University of Crete, Greece, Virginia Tech, and University of Arizona. Avadh serves on many international advisory committees/boards, e.g., ICOMAT, CIMTEC, Deployable Quantum Computing, etc.

== Most cited publications ==
1. Conformational dynamics of photoexcited conjugated molecules
  By: Tretiak, S; Saxena, A; Martin, RL; et al. Physical Review Letters Volume: 89 Issue: 9 Article Number: 097402 Published: AUG 26 2002
2. 2-Band Model for Halogen-Bridged Mixed-Valence Transition-Metal Complexes. 1. Ground-state and Excitation Spectrum
  By: Gammel, JT; Saxenx, A; Batistic, I; et al. Physical Review B Volume: 45 Issue: 12 Pages: 6408-6434 Published: MAR 15 1992
3. Efficient computation of the structural phase behavior of block copolymers
  By: Tzeremes, G; Rasmussen, KO; Lookman, T; et al. Physical Review E Volume: 65 Issue: 4 Article Number: 041806 Part: 1 Published: APR 2002
4. Real-time observation of nonlinear coherent phonon dynamics in single-walled carbon nanotubes
  By: Gambetta, A.; Manzoni, C.; Menna, E.; et al. NATURE PHYSICS Volume: 2 Issue: 8 Pages: 515-520 Published: AUG 2006
5. Molecular geometry fluctuation model for the mobility of conjugated polymers
  By: Yu, ZG; Smith, DL; Saxena, A; et al. Physical Review Letters Volume: 84 Issue: 4 Pages: 721-724 Published: JAN 24 2000
6. Ferroelastic dynamics and strain compatibility
  By: Lookman, T; Shenoy, SR; Rasmussen, KO; et al. Physical Review B Volume: 67 Issue: 2 Article Number: 024114 Published: JAN 1 2003
7. Particle model for skyrmions in metallic chiral magnets: Dynamics, pinning, and creep
  By: Lin, Shi-Zeng; Reichhardt, Charles; Batista, Cristian D.; et al. Physical Review B Volume: 87 Issue: 21 Article Number: 214419 Published: JUN 17 2013
8. Martensitic textures: Multiscale consequences of elastic compatibility
  By: Shenoy, SR; Lookman, T; Saxena, A; et al. Physical Review B Volume: 60 Issue: 18 Pages: 12537-12541 Published: NOV 1 1999
9. Molecular geometry fluctuations and field-dependent mobility in conjugated polymers
  By: Yu, ZG; Smith, DL; Saxena, A; et al. Physical Review B Volume: 63 Issue: 8 Article Number: 085202 Published: FEB 15 2001
10. Thermally activated avalanches: Jamming and the progression of needle domains
  By: Salje, E. K. H.; Ding, X.; Zhao, Z.; et al. Physical Review B Volume: 83 Issue: 10 Article Number: 104109 Published: MAR 25 2011
