= Ambashtha =

Indian caste

Ambashtha or Ambastha is a caste or sub-caste or a community of Hindus in India. According to Hindu scriptures, the term Ambastha refers to the offspring of a Brahmin father and a Vaishya mother, whose traditional occupation was the practice of medicine.

The term Ambastha is also used to describe a particular sub-caste within the Chitraguptavanshi Kayastha community, found mainly in North-Indian region (Bihar and Jharkhand).

== Origin ==
=== Hindu Scriptures ===
In the ancient Indian epic Mahabharata, a warrior tribe named Ambastha has been mentioned. During Alexander's invasion, they had 60000 infantry, 6000 horsemen and 500 chariots. They have been described as inhabitants of northwestern part of Indian subcontinent (near Lahore), and they were conquered by Nakula and paid tribute to Yudisthira. They fought in the Kurukhetra war (initially for the Pandavas but later for Drona). They took to different professions like priesthood, farming and medicine, and are assumed to have migrated to eastern India later on.

The term Ambastha also gets mentioned in Hindu text Manusmriti as the offspring of a union between Brahmin male and Vaishya female.

== Varna status ==
Ridgeon mentions about the myth related to the origin of the four varnas in the Rigveda, and says that in order to explain "the great number of castes, a theory was developed that unions between men and women of different varnas produced offspring of various castes".

Citing the Hindu text Parasara, Leslie mentions that the Ambastha is supposed to treat the Brahmins only, and hence considered as "a clean caste, definitely below the brahman, but certainly well within the twice-born group". This differentiates the Ambasthas from the average Vaidyas, who were considered "unclean" and were denied the status accorded to the Ambastha.

== Ambashthas of Bihar ==
According to Bindeshwari Prasad Sinha the ancient Ambasthas migrated to Bihar and created a sub-division of the greater Kayastha caste of this region.

== Early medieval Bengal ==
In the Brihaddharma Purana the Ambashthas and the Baidyas/Vaidyas were considered as the same caste in its list of 36 castes but another text, the Brahma Vaivarta Purana considered them as two separate sub-castes. Bharatmallik (17th century), the author of the Chandraprabha and Bhattitika has introduced himself as both Vaidya and Ambashtha, which indicates both the castes may have been considered as one in early medieval Bengal.
