= Anurag, Bangladesh =

- Location in Bangladesh
- Coordinates: 22°39′N 90°18′E
- Country: Bangladesh
- Division: Barisal Division
- District: Jhalokati
- Time zone: UTC+6 (Bangladesh Time)

Anurag, Bangladesh is a village in Jhalokati District in the Barisal Division of southern-central Bangladesh.
