= Ram Ratan Bhatnagar =

Dr. Ram Ratan Bhatnagar
- Born: 14 January 1914; Rampur, British India
- Died: 13 April 1992 (aged 78); Sagar, Madhya Pradesh
- Occupations: Poet, Professor, Scholar
- Writing career
- Notable works: Tandav, Nirala

Dr. Ram Ratan Bhatnagar (1914-1992) was a Hindi scholar, professor in the Hindi Department at the University of Sagar, writer and critic of Hindi literature and poetry.

== Early days ==
Bhatnagar was born on 14 January 1914 in the city of Rampur, British India. After his initial education at Rampur he proceeded to Lucknow to study English literature where he came in close contact of poet ‘Nirala’ and was influenced by his writings.

== Education ==
Later he moved to the University of Allahabad for studies and research in Hindi literature where he came in contact with eminent poets and writers like Sumitranandan Pant, Mahadevi Varma and Ram Kumar Verma. In 1951 he moved to the University of Sagar where Acharya Nand Dulare Bajpai was the head of the Hindi Department.

After further studies, he became a Master of Philosophy (English) at the University of Lucknow (1937), Master of Philosophy (HindI) at the University of Allahabad (1939) and Doctor of Philosophy at the University of Allahabad (1948) where his main focus of research was the rise and growth of Hindi journalism. He was awarded Doctor of literature at the University of Sagar in 1972.

Bhatnagar wrote books on literary criticism and essays on current topics. After joining the Hindi Department of the University of Saugor as Assistant Professor in 1951 he taught there until 1976 when he retired as a Professor. He died on 13 April 1992.

Bhatnagar established himself as independent and enlightened critic of Hindi literature. His critique on the works of the eminent writers of his time is reflected in his published works. Little is known about his capabilities as a poet because many of his works are not yet published, however his ability is reflected in the collections of poems that have been published.

== Published works ==
=== Essays and criticism ===
1. Nibandh Prabodh (1939–1946 – five editions)
2. Sur Sahitya ki Bhumika (co-author – Vachispati Tripathi (1941, 1945, 1964)
1. Premchand (1944, 1948)
2. Tulasi Das (1944, 1946)
3. Prabandh Purnima (1946)
4. Kabir : Ek Adhyayan (1946, 1950)
5. Tulasi Sahitya ki Bhumika (1946, 1958)
6. Kavi Prasad (1946, 1948, 1953)
7. Sur Das (1946, 1948, 1950)
8. Vidyapati: Ek Adhyayan (1947, 1950)
9. Nand Das : Ek Adhyayan (1947, 1949)
10. Bihari: Ek Adhyayan (1947, 1950)
11. Bhartendu: Ek Adhyayan (1947, 1950)
12. Kavi Nirala: Ek Adhyayan (1947, 1950)
13. Chayavad (1947, 1950)
14. Keshava Das : Ek Adhyayan (1947, 1950)
15. Hindi Sahitya : Ek Adhyayan (1948)
16. Malik Muhamad Jayasi (1948, 1950)
17. Kamayani (1948)
18. Rahasyavad (1948, 1951)
19. Hindi kavita (1948)
20. Hindi Gadhya (1948)
21. Hindi Bhakti Kavya (1948)
22. Sahitya Samiksha (1948)
23. Hindi Sahitya : Ek Adhyayan (1948, 1950)
24. Hindi Sagar (1948)
25. Rise and Growth of Hindi Journalism (1948)
26. Sarojani Naidu-The poet of the Nation (1948)
27. Tagore The Poet (1948)
28. Premchand (1948)
29. Maithali Sharan Gupt (1948, 1951)
30. Mahadevi Verma (1950)
31. Prabandh Parichay (1950)
32. Naye Nibandh (1950)
33. Sahitya Nibandh (1950)
34. Hindi Sahitya Ka Sankshipt Parichay (1950)
35. Apathit Gadhya (1950)
36. Kabir Sahitya Ki Bhumika (1950)
37. Prasad Ki Vichardhara (1950)
38. Hindi Kavya Parampara (1950)
39. Prasad Ka Katha Sahitya (1950)
40. Hindi-Bharati (two volumes) (1951)
41. Hindi Ke chah Upanyas (1951)
42. Sumitranandan Pant (1951)
43. Prasad Ke Natak (1951)
44. Hindi Kavita Ki Prasthabhumi (1951)
45. Kalakar Premchand (1951)
46. Prabandh Pradip (1951)
47. Hindi Kavi Parampara (1952)
48. Nirala (1952)
49. Prachin Hindi Kavya (1952)
50. Sur Samiksha (1952)
51. Prabandh Prabhakar (1953)
52. Prasad Ka Jivan aur Sahitya (1953)
53. Adhyayan aur Aalochan (1957)
54. Prasad Sahitya aur SamIksha (1958)
55. Jainendra Sahitya aur Samiksha (1958)
56. Hindi Sahitya ka Sankshipt Itihas (1962, 1964)
57. Mulya aur Mulyankan (1962)
58. Madhyayugin Vaisnav Sanskrati aur Tulasidas (1962)
59. Samayik Jeevan aur Sahitya (1963)
60. Madhyamik Nibandh (1964)
61. Nirala aur Navjagaran (1965)
62. Hindi Sahity ki Ruprekha (1970)
63. Surdas :Nav Mulyankan (1970)
64. Nav Nibandh (1970)
65. Hindi Kavita ‘Sinhavalokan’ (1971)
66. Tulasi : Navmulyankan (1971)
67. Nirala Navmulyankan (1973)
68. Sahity aur Sarjana (1988)
69. Upnyasakar Jainendra

=== Novels ===
1. Ambapali (1939, 1945, 1951)
2. Aakash ki Katha (1942)
3. Jay Vasudev (1959)

=== Poetry ===
1. Tandav (1942)
2. Nirala (1962)
3. Prakash Jahan Bhi Hai (1982)
4. Tulasidas (1983)
5. Venugeet (1984)
6. Geeton ke Amaltas (1985)
7. Jagaran (1991)

=== Sankalan ===
1. Aadhunik Kahaniyan (1957, 1959)
2. Ruparang (1958)
3. Gadyayan (1962)
4. Saptarang (1968)
5. Uttra (1968)
6. Kalantar (1970)
7. Saat Ekanki (1970)
8. Sanchayan (1970)
9. Nav Jatak (1970)
10. Nibandh Nilay (1975)
11. Rupayan (1975)
12. Parampara (1977)
13. Nikash (1980)
14. Antarang (1980)
15. Samvet

=== Other ===
1. Lakadi par Polish (co-writer - Gorakh Prasad) (1940)
