= Aba Parasnis =

Vithal Sakharam Parasnis (17xx–18xx) was a Sanskrit, Vedic and Persian scholar of the early 19th century Maharashtra. Commonly known as "Aba", he is usually referred to as Aba Parasnis by sources. He was a native of the Thane district of Maharashtra.

== Consultant to James Grand Duff ==
Aba was one of the three scholars who were consultants to the British historian James Grant Duff, specifically in Persian sources of the history of Maharashtra — the other two scholars being Balajipant Natu and Balvantrao Chitnis. Duff consistently asked then for more information, and would consult them on interpretations of terms and policies and explanations for events in the materials that he had in his possession. His questions were directed to the origin and justification of specific policies and concepts: taxes such as chauth and sardeshmukhi. Duff could be frustrated by what he deemed "inconsistent answers", while the scholars, on their part, resented "insistent cross examination" by Duff.

== Debate on Vedic scriptures and Hindu Shastras ==
Parasnis is most notable for a unique "Brahmin varna vs Kshatriya varna" debate that took place at Satara. It involved discussions and disputes related to the intricacies of the Hindu Shastras, Vedas and Puranas. The Kshatriya varna was represented by Parasnis and the Brahman varna was represented by Raghvacharya Gajendragadkar. This historic debate took place in the early 19th century Maharashtra. It was attended by hundreds of prominent Brahmins all over Maharashtra. Historians have credited Parasnis for debating effectively and "holding his own".

== Literature ==
Two Sanskrit books "Karmakalapdruma" and "Siddhantavijaya" were authored by Parasnis and published by Pratapsimha. The "Siddhantavijaya" is considered important because it gives details of the Maratha clan system. It is written in Sanskrit with some content in marathi. The other Sanskrit scripture authored by him is "Karmakalpadruma". It is a manual for Hindu rituals and hence called the samskara manual. A translation of Siddhanatavijaya and some commentary was written by Mahadev Ganesh Dongre in the early 20th century.

== Sanskrit School ==
Pratapsimha realized the importance of the knowledge of Sanskrit and decided to open a "pathshala" to teach Sanskrit to boys from the Maratha caste. Parasnis was the first head of this school.
