= Gopal Bhatnagar =

Canadian cardiac surgeon based in Toronto, Canada

- Education: MD, University of Western Ontario; MEd, OISE, University of Toronto
- Employer: Cleveland Clinic Abu Dhabi
- Known for: Heart surgery, electronic cigarettes
- Website: http://trilliumhealthpartners.ca/

Gopal Bhatnagar is a Canadian cardiac surgeon based in Abu Dhabi, United Arab Emirates. Bhatnagar previously headed the cardiovascular surgery unit at Trillium Health Centre and served as Chief of Staff at Trillium Hospital from 2005 to March 2013. He is a practitioner of beating heart surgery and performs minimally invasive cardiac surgery. Today he leads the Heart and Vascular Institute at the Cleveland Clinic Abu Dhabi. In his early life he lived in London, Ontario and joined the Canadian Armed Forces. He has competed in a couple of bodybuilding competitions and won his first, and placing second in his second.

== Honors ==
On March 8, 2013, Trillium Health Partners announced the endowment of the Dr. Gopal Bhatnagar Chair in Cardiac Health System Leadership. He has also been awarded the Queen Elizabeth II Diamond Jubilee Medal as well as numerous other awards for his dedication to cardiovascular surgery.

== E-cigarette company ==
Bhatnagar, along with Boris Giller and Ashutosh Jha, co-founded an electronic cigarette company called 180 Smoke Vape Store. In 2010, Bhatnagar claimed that vaping is safer than smoking. Bhatnagar and his partners later sold 180 Smoke to Origin House, and he currently is pursuing other business opportunities, both in and out of the healthcare space.
