= Shankar Abaji Bhise =

Indian scientist and inventor

Shankar Abaji Bhisey
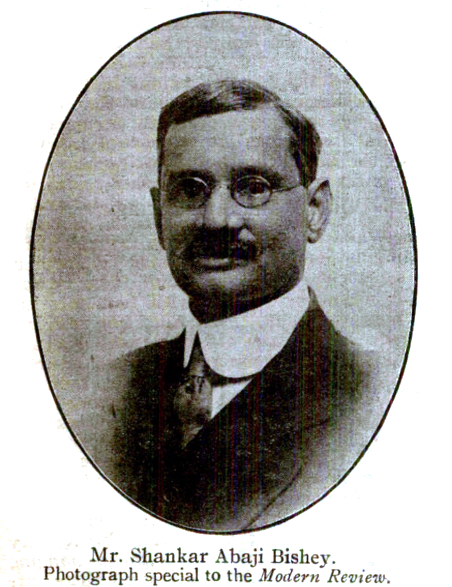
- Born: 29 April 1867
- Died: 7 April 1935 (aged 68)
- Other name: Edison of India
- Occupations: Inventor, academic

Shankar Abaji Bhisey, Sunker Abaji Bhisey, Shanker Abaji Bhise or Sunker Bisey Abaji (he used the form Bisey in the US) (29 April 1867 – 7 April 1935) was a self-taught Indian inventor who was once called by the New York American as the "Edison of India". Sponsored by Indian nationalists, he moved to England where his inventions included a type-setting machine for the printing industry, an advertising innovation and so on. He then moved to the US where he designed a modification of the then popular ouija board where the supposed message of the spirit was printed onto a strip of paper. This spirit typewriter was patented in the US on 27 June 1922. He made no money from it but shortly after that he promoted a form of iodine termed as "atomidine" as a patent medicine, promoted by the American psychic Edgar Cayce, which earned him royalty and fame. He had nearly 200 inventions to his credit with 40 of them patented.

== Life and work ==
Bhisey was born in Bombay. His father Abaji had been a court worker, a Munsif to a Shirestadar before becoming a Sadar Amin at Surat. After his father moved to Jalgaon, Bhisey spent time reading Scientific American and conducting experiments. He had only a high school education but was interested in tinkering with mechanical devices. He began a Scientific Club in Bombay which had meetings each month. He was also involved in other activities including mentalism, magic tricks, and seances - associating also with the theosophists of the period who admired his abilities as a traditional Indian necromancer. After his father died in 1893, he accepted an offer to go to England to show his inventions (of optical illusions and mind reading) with support from Sayajirao Gaikwad of Baroda, and he drew the interests of Dadabhai Naoroji, Ratanji Tata and G.K. Gokhale. He examined paper pulping in England and returned to India to try to obtain a job at the Girgaon Paper Mill in 1896 but failed. During the same year, he volunteered in the plague management efforts in Fanaswadi Ward of Bombay. His caste of Chandraseniya Kayastha Prabhu had ostracised him for undertaking a sea voyage but in 1898 he was honoured for his work during the plague.

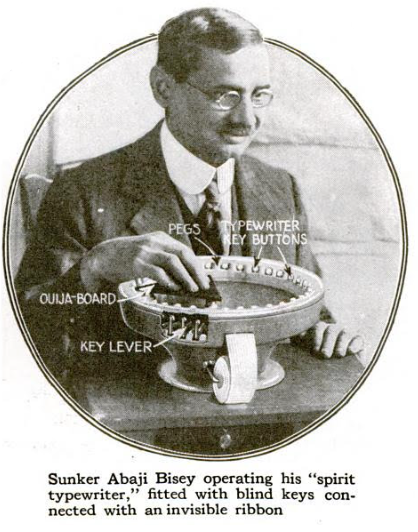

In 1896 he applied for a patent for a station indicator for use in the railways which showed the station of halt, the stations that had been passed and an estimate of the time to reach the next station. His father wished that he had trained in the legal profession, but he instead worked in the Accountant General's office in Bombay (1888-1897), which left him time for his own studies and diversions. He came into the limelight when he won a £10 prize in July 1897 for an invention for an automatic weighing machine in a contest held in England. Several Indian newspapers of the period declared that his work demonstrated Indian talent in science, and he sought sponsorship from Indian princes for him to travel and demonstrate his talents in Europe or America. In 1898 he designed a sliding door, while a patent application for a method for tying Indian turbans and pagries, submitted in 1897, lapsed due to failure of payments. Around this period he moved to England. In 1901 Bhisey invented an illuminated advertising machine called a "Vertoscope" that could show multiple coloured advertisements which changed rapidly at intervals. This was however banned for use in London claiming that it startled horses. When this machine was displayed in the World Trade Exhibition in 1901 several English backers sought to purchase the rights but he was advised against it by Dadabhai Naoroji who helped him instead to found the Bhisey Patent Syndicate. He had the same device exhibited in Paris in 1901 with support from Mancherji Bhavnagari. He patented an automatic toilet flush, an automatic bicycle stand, and the Vertolite Sign Lamp. The most influential invention was a type-setting machine called the Spasotype and later the Bhiso-type which could insert blocks at 1500 to 2000 characters per hour for use in printing. The Hindu Missionary Society and several other Indian nationalist groups promoted Bhisey and his talents. He was invited to several meetings where he was honoured, including the Indian National Trade Congress at Madras on 26 December 1908. He and his wife Sushilabai, as well as others like Govind Kukade and Govind Ray, established an Indian society in London. In 1910 Ratanji Tata established the Tata Bhisey Invention Syndicate in London. During World War I, Shapurji Saklatwala who managed operations in London for Tata shutdown Bhisey's syndicate and sold off the machinery to manufacture his Bhisotype. Bhisey then joined hands with Charles Slaughter of the Universal Type Casting Company in the US. Bhisey faced significant difficulties with the Tatas and it was not until 1920 that he was able to launch his own corporation in the US, the Bhisey Ideal Type Caster Corporation. In 1917 he also dabbled in chemistry, producing a washing chemical called "Shella". He also developed an iodine based formulation called Baseline that he believed cured his malaria and could make water safe for drinking. It was later bought in 1926 and renamed as Atomidine and was touted as a remedy for blood pressure, pyorrhoea, malaria and influenza. He was labelled in the press as the "Indian Edison" and science journalist Francis Tietsort of the New York American proposed that he be given an honorary doctorate. Bhisey received an honorary doctorate in psychoanalysis from Chicago University. In 1930 he met his childhood inspiration, Edison, in New Jersey. He was sometimes referred to as "professor" and used the DSc as a postnominal along with F.S.Sc. (Fellow of the Society of Science, Letters and Arts of London).

Bhisey also wrote in Marathi, a family history of Raghunatha Viththala, also called Bapuji Viththala Satpute in 1896 and wrote a script for a drama called Garden of Agra or Diplomatic Doorga which featured Jack, an English boy falling in love with an Indian girl Doorga. Bhisey was politically a moderate, a supporter of the Indian National Congress and a staunch follower of Dadabhai Naoroji. He sought to build a Lotus Philosophy Centre for the promotion of an inter religious practice. The six petals of the lotus in the plan of the building represented the six major religions.
