= Jitendra Bhatnagar =

Indian cricketer

Cricket information
- Batting: Right-handed
- Source: ESPNcricinfo, 30 November 2016

Jitendra Bhatnagar is an Indian first-class cricketer who represented Rajasthan. He made his first-class debut for Rajasthan in the 1963-64 Ranji Trophy on 9 November 1963.
