= Shinjini Bhatnagar =

Indian pediatric gastroenterologist

- Education: Lady Hardinge Medical College, University of Delhi
- Awards: Hotam Tomar Gold Medal Dr. ST Achar Gold Medal Award for Research in Child Health WHO Temporary Advisor for research in childhood diarrheal diseases Fellow, National Academy of Sciences
- Scientific career
- Fields: Pediatric Gastroenterology
- Workplaces: Translational Health Science and Technology Institute, Faridabad

Shinjini Bhatnagar is an Indian pediatric gastroenterologist. She is elected as Fellow of National Academy of Sciences. Her research was recognised by the World Health Organization (WHO), and at 2nd World Congress of Pediatric Gastroenterology, Hepatology & Nutrition. She was awarded the Dr. ST Achar Gold Medal Award for Research in Child Health, and Hotam Tomar Gold Medal in recognition of her research in Pediatric Gastroenterology.

== Education and career ==
Shinjini Bhatnagar is the professor, and head of the Pediatric Biology Centre, at the Translational Health Science and Technology Institute (THSTI), Faridabad (National Capital Region, India). Projects under her leadership include exploring poor intake of oral vaccines in developing countries, extent of celiac disease in India, etc.

== Research ==
How does an infant's immune system respond to a bacterial infection; what are some of the markers that can be used to track the severity, progression and outcome of infections—these are the broad questions being pursued by the Bhatnagar Lab. Shinjini Bhatnagar and her team developed a test for gluten intolerance Shinjini Bhatnagar and her team reported that zinc supplement improves infant survival from infections.

== Awards and honors ==
- Fellow, National Academy of Sciences, India
- WHO Temporary Advisor for research in childhood diarrheal diseases
- Recognition for research in Pediatric Gastroenterology at 2nd World Congress of Pediatric Gastroenterology, Hepatology & Nutrition (2004)
