= Optical Materials =

- Discipline: Optics, Chemistry, Physics
- Language: English
- Edited by: A. Srivastava

Publication details
- History: 1992-present
- Publisher: Elsevier
- Frequency: Monthly
- Impact factor: 3.08 (2020)

Standard abbreviations
- ISO 4: Opt. Mater.

Indexing
- CODEN: OMATET
- ISSN: 0925-3467 (print); 1873-1252 (web)
- LCCN: 93023084
- OCLC no.: 39097987

Links
- Journal homepage; Online access

Optical Materials is a peer-reviewed scientific journal that publishes original papers and review articles on the design, synthesis, characterisation and applications of materials, suitable for various optical devices. The journal also publishes papers about physical and chemical properties of such materials and their applications.

== Abstracting and indexing ==
Optical Materials is abstracted and indexed in the following databases:

- Chemical Abstracts Service
- Current Contents/Engineering, Computing & Technology
- Compendex/Engineering Index
- Inspec
- Scopus
