= Mahendra Bhatnagar =

Indian Hindi and English poet (1926–2020)

- Born: 26 June 1926; Jhansi, United Provinces, British India
- Died: Died 27 April 2020 [aged 94 approx.(93 Years 10 June)] Gwalior, Madhya Pradesh, India; Gwalior, Madhya Pradesh, India
- Education: Nagpur University
- Writing career
- Language: Hindi, English

Mahendra Bhatnagar (26 June 1926 – 27 April 2020) was an Indian Hindi and English poet. He is seen as one of the significant post-independence voices in his field of poetry, who expressed lyricism and pathos, as well as aspirations and yearnings of the modern Indian intellect.

== Early life and education ==
Mahendra Bhatnagar was born in Jhansi, Uttar Pradesh at his maternal grandfather's residence on 26 June 1926.

He received primary education in Jhansi, Morar, Gwalior, and Sabalgarh, Morena. He then graduated high school in Gwalior and intermediate at Madhav College in 1941 and 1943 respectively. He finally received his Bachelor of Arts degree at the Victoria College in 1945. After graduating, he pursued his Master's Degree and Doctorate at the Nagpur University in 1948 and 1957 respectively. He also received his teacher's license (L.T.1950) from the Madhya Bharat government.

== Career ==
He was selected to become a professor of Hindi Language at Tashkent University in 1978 by the University Grants Commission and the Indian Council for Cultural Relations. He was also the principal investigator of the University Grants Commission at the Jiwaji University from 1984 to 1987. In 1992, he taught at the Indira Gandhi National Open University Teaching Centre. Afterwards, he worked as a chairman and a member of various committees in Indore University, Vikram University, and Dr. Bhimrao Ambedkar University and others.

He also worked in the Light Music of All India Radio as one of the members in the Audition Committees of Drama, and was contracted as a songwriter. He also conducted and directed many literary societies.

Furthermore, he became one of the award-judges at the following places: Bihar Rashtra-Bhasha Parishad, (1981 & 1983), Uttar Pradesh Hindi Sansthan (1983), Rajasthan Sahitya Akademi (1991,1993,1994), and Hindi Sahitya Parishad (2001).

=== Literary ===
Mahendra Bhatnagar is one of the many Indian poets whose literary careers were shaped by poetry in the post-independence of India in the 20th century. His poetic career over the years demonstrates his humanistic vision from beginning to end. His poems reflect not only the moods of a poet but of a complex age. In his works, the thread of his humanistic vision can be seen vividly and he wrote poems to bring about a change in the world. He analyses, interprets, evaluates and describes his emotions in the light of his humanistic vision. For example, his poem "Helplessness" reveals not only his own helplessness, but also of the common people of India:

"Thrust upon, undesired life, I lived.
Every instant, every step, shame I lived
History, now you ask me what
Folly and dirtiness of the world, I lived."

He also uses irony to expose the fraud of exploiters, particularly exposing the enemies of the labourers and the peasants of India. With his humanistic vision, he constantly compels the readers to distinguish between power and propriety.

His poems were translated, published and broadcast in many foreign and Indian languages. However, he also edited Hindi literary magazines such as Sandhya and Pratikalpa magazines. He was also the adviser of Poetcrit magazine, and a member of the advisory board of Indian Journal of Postcolonial Literature.

== Bibliography ==
Eleven volumes of poems in English :

- Forty Poems of Mahendra Bhatnagar [Selected Poems – 1]
- After The Forty Poems [Selected Poets – 2]
- Dr. Mahendra Bhatnagar's Poetry. [Selection Poems – 3]
- "Exuberance" and other poems.
- "Death Perception : Life Perception"
- "Passion and Compassion"
- "Poems : For A Better World"
- "Lyric-Lute"
- "A Handful of Light"
- "New Enlightened World"
- "Dawn to Dusk"

Distinguished Anthologies :

- "Pomes: For Human Dignity"
- Poems of social harmony & humanism: realistic & visionary aspects - "Life: As It Is"
- Poems of faith & optimism : delight & pain/ Philosophy of life - "O, Moon, My Sweet-Hearet!"
- Love poems - "Sparrow" and other poems
- Nature poems - "Death and Life"
- Poems on death-perception : life-perception & Critical Study
  - One volume of translated poems in French - "A Modern Indian Poet : Dr. Mahendra Bhatnagar : Un Poèt Indien Et Moderne"
  - Works published in seven volumes in Hindi – three poems (comprising sixteen earlier collections), two critical articles, one on Premchand (Research work) and one from miscellaneous writings.
- Only poetry works published in three volumes in Hindi — "Dr. Mahendra Bhatnagar Ki Kavitaa-Gangaa" (18 Collections)

Published research & critical studies :

- Living Through Challenges : A Study of Dr. Mahendra Bhatnagar's Poetry. [by Dr. B.C. Dwivedy]
- Poet Dr. Mahendra Bhatnagar : His Mind And Art. [Edited]
- Concerns and Creation. [Edited]
- E-Book : Dr. Mahendra Bhatnagar's Poetry in the eyes of critics. [KedarNath Sharma]
- The Poetry of Mahendra Bhatnagar : Realistic & Visionary Aspects. [Edited / forthcoming]

Work in Hindi

- Kaviśrī (Poems)
- Jujhate hue (Poems)

== Awards ==
- Four times (1952, 1958, 1960, 1985) from the Madhya Pradesh Government Award
