= Abha Saxena =

Bioethicist and global health specialist

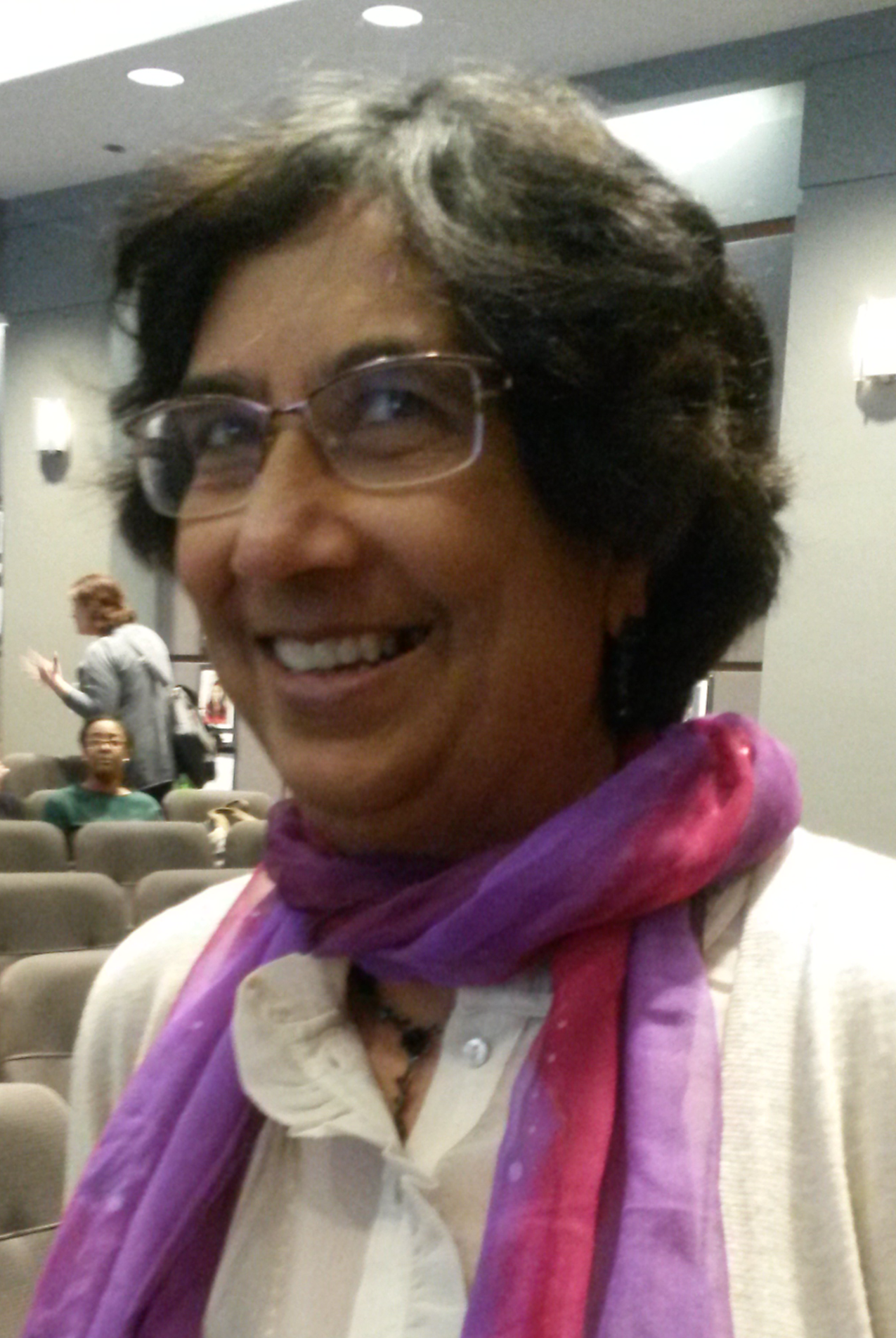
- Saxena in 2017
- Born: India

Education
- Education: All India Institute of Medical Sciences, New Delhi

Philosophical work
- Era: 20th-century philosophy, 21st-century philosophy
- Region: Western Philosophy, International Philosophy, Global health ethics
- School: Ethical philosophy
- Institutions: All India Institute of Medical Sciences, New Delhi World Health Organization
- Main interests: Ethics; Justice; Politics; Public health; Medical ethics; Global health; Population health; Health ethics

Abha Saxena is an Indian bioethicist and global health specialist. She was trained as an anesthesiologist, and practiced medicine for several years before moving to the World Health Organization in 2001. There she was heavily involved in bioethics work, coordinating the WHO Research ethics committee and Global Health Ethics Team. Since 2018, Saxena has been a visiting professor at the University of Geneva and a Senior Bioethics adviser at the INCLEN Trust International.

== Education ==
Saxena completed her undergraduate degree, MBBS, and MD from the All India Institute of Medical Sciences, New Delhi, where she trained as an anesthesiologist.

== Career ==
Saxena was a member of the faculty of the All India Institute of Medical Sciences, New Delhi from 1986 to 1999, during which time she taught and conducted research in anesthesiology and palliative care. She started palliative care services at the cancer centre where she worked, and she was among the first doctors in Delhi to support palliative care at home. For twenty years, she practiced medicine actively in hospital and community-based research in India.

In 2001, she joined the World Health Organization in Geneva, Switzerland. There, she managed the WHO Research ethics review committee from 2002 to 2018, and the Global Health Ethics Team from 2013 to 2018. She led WHO's ethics work during the 2014–2016 Ebola outbreak in West Africa and the 2016 Zika outbreak. She also worked with the Global Summit of National Bioethics Committees, a meeting where national committees share their experience. In March 2018 the WHO Global Health Ethics Team and the African coaLition for Epidemic Research, Response and Training (ALERRT) held a workshop with national ethics committees on how to review research quickly during outbreaks. Saxena was the lead author of the paper that set out the workshop's recommendations. She was also a co-author of a survey of national ethics committees carried out in early 2018. It found that many of these committees had few resources and faced problems with independence and funding. In May 2018, Saxena left the World Health Organization and is now a visiting professor at the University of Geneva and a Senior Bioethics adviser at the INCLEN Trust International.

When she left WHO, Saxena worked as an adviser on research ethics. In 2019, she wrote for Scientific American magazine that health researchers should work with the communities affected by their research. In 2021 she was the lead author of a paper in the Journal of Medical Ethics that compared WHO's 2016 guidance on ethics in outbreaks with the response to the COVID-19 pandemic. The authors concluded that the guidance should be updated.

== Personal life ==
Saxena is married to Shekhar Saxena, also of the World Health Organization, and together they live in Geneva, Switzerland. They have two adult daughters.

== Select publications ==
- Cash, R., Wikler, D., Saxena, A., Capron, A. Casebook on Ethical Issues in International Health Research, Geneva: World Health Organization, 2009, 2010. Translated into five languages, including Arabic, Chinese, English, French, Russian, and Spanish. ISBN 978-92-4-154772-7 (NLM classification: W 20.5).
- Saxena, A., Gomes, M. Ethical challenges to responding to the Ebola epidemic: The World Health Organization experience. Clinical Trials 2006 (January):13(1). doi:10.1177/1740774515621870.
