= Shekhar Saxena =

Indian psychiatrist

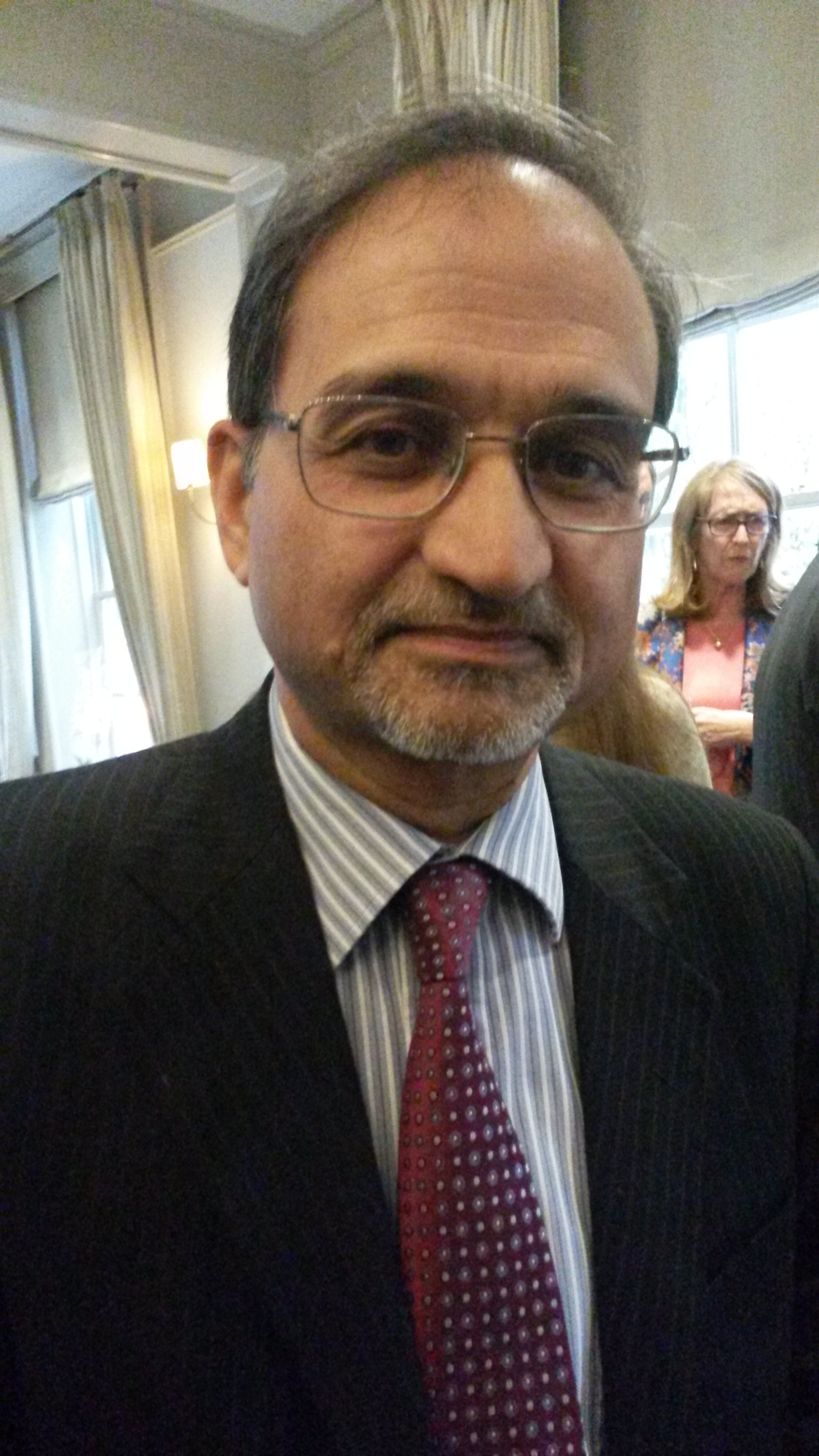
- Shekhar Saxena, 9 May 2017
- Born: India
- Occupations: Psychiatrist, Researcher, Professor

Shekhar Saxena is an Indian psychiatrist. He has worked at the World Health Organization (WHO) and since 2010 has been the Director of the Department of Mental Health and Substance Abuse (MSD) at World Health Organization's Headquarters Office in Geneva, Switzerland. He is recipient of the 2017 Leon Eisenberg Award. In September 2018 joined the Harvard T.H. Chan School of Public Health as visiting professor of Global Mental Health in the Department of Global Health and Population.

== Education ==
- MD, Psychiatry - All India Institute of Medical Sciences, Delhi, India (AIIMS)
- Medical residency - All India Institute of Medical Sciences, Delhi, India (AIIMS)

== Career ==
Before joining WHO in 1998 and moving to Geneva, Saxena served as a clinical psychiatrist to patients in Delhi, India. One of the organizations he worked for was the All India Institute of Medical Sciences. In 2010, he was appointed the Director of the Department of Mental Health and Substance Abuse.

Some of his work involves the prevention and management of mental, developmental, neurological, and substance use disorders, and suicide prevention. At WHO, he also led the implementation of the organization's mental health Gap Action Programme.

On 9 May 2017, he received the 8th Annual Leon Eisenberg Award at the Harvard Faculty Club in Cambridge, Massachusetts. In June 2018, after 8 years, he stepped down as the Director of the Department of Mental Health and Substance Abuse at WHO.

== Personal life ==
Shekhar Saxena is married to Dr. Abha Saxena, Director of Global Health Ethics at the World Health Organization. She is also a medical doctor, anesthesiologist, and a bioethicist, and together they live in Geneva, Switzerland. They have two adult daughters no longer living with them.
