= Saumitra Saxena =

American poet

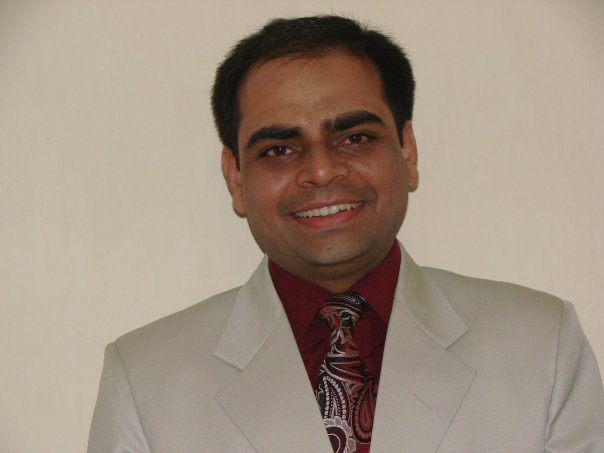
- Born: 1976 (age 49–50)
- Known for: Hindi poetry

Saumitra Saxena (Devanāgarī: सौमित्र सक्सेना, born 1976) is a United States based poet of Indian origin. He is one of the widely read poets of Hindi language of present generation. His critically acclaimed first collection of poems in Hindi titled "Mitra" meaning "a friend" received the Bharatiya Jnanpith Navlekhan Award in 2008. The book "Mitra" was included in the Library of Congress in 2010 as an important contemporary piece of South Asian literature and is widely distributed across many major libraries of the world. He currently lives in Dayton, Ohio with his wife and a son.
