= Anuraag Saxena =

Indian activist, author and commentator

Anuraag Saxena is an Indian activist, author, and commentator. He is a founder of the India Pride Project, a volunteer effort to return to India archaeological artifacts taken out during the colonial period. Saxena was educated at the Timpany School in Visakhapatnam, and now lives in Singapore. In 2017, he began an online petition, #BringOurGodsHome, that garnered thousands of signatures from across the world. He has been featured on Washington Post, The Diplomat, the BBC, Doordarshan, The Hindu, Times of India, Hindustan Times, and the American Government publication SPAN.

== Published works ==
- Your Majesty: Thou shalt not steal
- Blood Buddhas: How Indian Heritage Fuels the Terror Machinery
- Indian antiquities under threat: Are we aware of the implications?
- Sunday Guardian Op Ed: Heritage Crimes
- Why be a part of Unesco if it’s not protecting or projecting India?
