= Nilima Nigam =

Indian and Canadian mathematician and mathematical physiologist

Nilima Nigam is an Indian and Canadian applied mathematician specializing in numerical analysis, partial differential equations, and mathematical models, particularly in problems of mathematical physiology involving muscular, skeletal, and cancer tissue in human bodies. She is a professor of mathematics at Simon Fraser University.

== Education and career ==
Nigam was a physics student at IIT Kharagpur in India, where she graduated with honours in 1994. She went to the University of Delaware for graduate study in mathematics, earned a master's degree there in 1996, and completed her Ph.D. in 1999. Her dissertation, Variational Methods for a Class of Boundary Value Problems Exterior to a Thin Domain, was supervised by George Chia-Chu Hsiao.

After postdoctoral research at the Institute for Mathematics and its Applications at the University of Minnesota, she moved to Canada as an assistant professor of mathematics and statistics at McGill University, in 2001. McGill gave her tenure as an associate professor in 2008, the same year that she moved to her present position at Simon Fraser University. From 2008 to 2010, she was also associate scientific director at Mitacs, a Canadian nonprofit research organization, and from 2008 to 2014 she held a tier II Canada Research Chair in applied mathematics. She was promoted to full professor at Simon Fraser in 2013.

== Recognition ==
Nigam was elected as a Fellow of the Canadian Mathematical Society in 2023.
