= Mathur (name) =

Surname list

Mathur is a subcaste of the Kayastha community in Northern India, with their origins possibly in Mathura.

== Mathur in South India ==
Sizeable Mathur community is also found in South India, mostly in Hyderabad. They mostly migrated from North India to find placement in administration under Medieval Indian rulers.

== Notable people ==
- Anurag Mathur, Indian author and journalist
- Arjun Mathur (born 1981), British-Indian actor
- Ashok Kumar Mathur (born 1943), the former Chief justice of Calcutta High Court, Justice of the Supreme Court of India
- Deepak Mathur (born 1952), Indian molecular and atomic physicist and professor
- Govind Mathur (born 1959), Indian Judge
- M. V. Mathur or Mukut Vehari Mathur (1915-2004), Indian economist and scholar
- Madhur Jaffrey (born 1933), Indian actress, food and travel writer, and television personality
- Mathura Das Mathur (1918–1993), Indian politician from Rajasthan
- Mini Mathur (born 1975), Indian television host, actor and model
- Mukesh Chand Mathur (1923–1976), better known mononymously as Mukesh, Indian playback singer
- Neil Nitin Mukesh Mathur (born 1982), Indian actor, born to singer Nitin Mukesh, and the grandson of singer Mukesh
- Nitin Mukesh Mathur, Indian playback singer
- Om Prakash Mathur (born 1952), Indian politician, member of Rajya Sabha from Rajasthan state in India
- Pradeep Mathur (born 1955), Indian politician and former 4 time MLA from the Mathura constituency of Uttar Pradesh
- Pradeep Mathur (scientist) (born 1955), Indian organometallic and cluster chemist and the founder director of the Indian Institute of Technology, Indore
- Prem Mathur Indian pilot, first Indian woman commercial pilot
- Raghav Mathur (born 1981), known professionally as Raghav, is a Canadian singer-songwriter
- R. K. Mathur or Radha Krishna Mathur (born 1953), Indian IAS officer
- Rajiv Dayal Mathur, Indian Air Marshal, officer in the Indian Air Force
- Sanjay Mathur (born 1968), German professor, inorganic chemist and past president of the American Ceramic Society
- Sharan Rani Backliwal née Mathur (1929–2008), Indian classical sarod player and music scholar
- Sheila Dhar (1929–2001), Indian author and singer of Kirana gharana
- Shiv Charan Mathur (1927–2009), Indian politician and minister
- Somesh Mathur, Indian singer, composer, songwriter, and music producer
- Surat Mathur (1930–2021), Indian long-distance runner
- Sushma Seth Mathur (born 1936), Indian stage, film and television actress
- Vartika Mathur (1979), Professor in Zoology, Sri Venkateswara College, University of Delhi
