= Madhur Jaffrey =

Actress, cook, and TV host (born 1933)

Madhur Jaffrey CBE
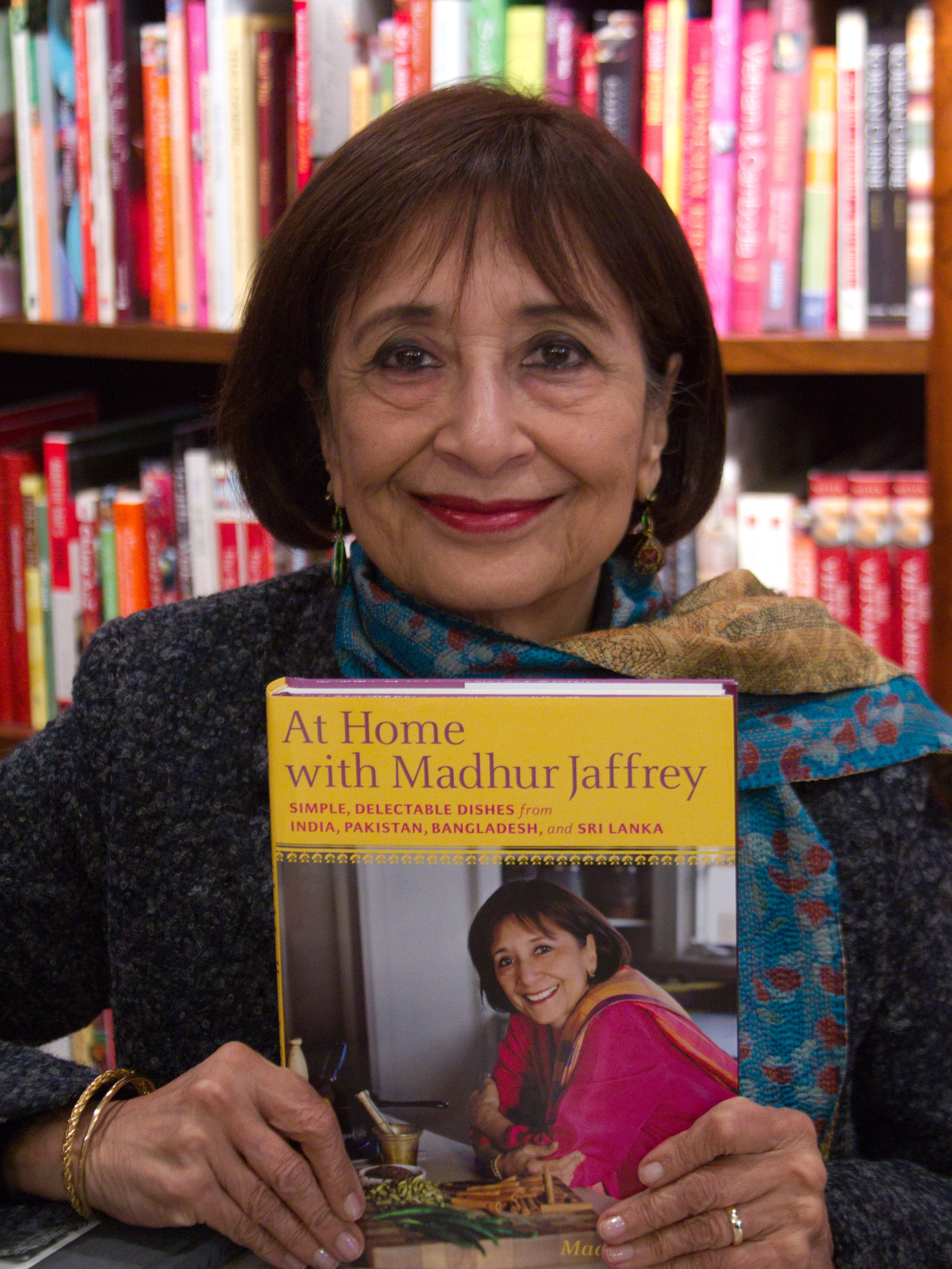
- Jaffrey at a book signing in 2010
- Born: Madhur Bahadur; 13 August 1933 (age 93); Civil Lines, Delhi, British India (present-day India)
- Education: Miranda House, University of Delhi (BA); Royal Academy of Dramatic Art (Dip)
- Spouses: Saeed Jaffrey (m. 1958; div. 1966); Sanford Allen (m. 1969)
- Children: Zia Jaffrey; Meera Jaffrey; Sakina Jaffrey
- Relatives: Maya Jaggi (niece); Raghu Raj Bahadur (cousin); Sheila Dhar (cousin)
- Awards: See below
- Honours: Order of the British Empire (2004); Padma Bhushan (2022)
- Culinary career
- Cooking style: Indian and South Asian
- Current restaurants
- Dawat, New York City (1986 to present)
- Television shows
- Madhur Jaffrey's Indian Cookery (1982), Far Eastern Cookery (1989), Listening To Volcanoes (1990), From Manna to Microwave (1990), Madhur Jaffrey’s Flavours of India (1995), Friends for Dinner (2001), Ready, Steady Cook (2001), Cooking Live (2001)
- Awards
- James Beard Foundation Award: 2023: Lifetime Achievement Award; 2006: Cookbook Hall of Fame An Invitation to Indian Cooking; 2004: International Cookbook From Curries to Kebabs; 2002: International Cookbook Madhur Jaffrey's Step-by-Step Cooking; 2000: International Cookbook Madhur Jaffrey's World Vegetarian; 1995: Who's Who of Food & Beverage in America: New York, New York; 1994: Cookbook of the Year Madhur Jaffrey's A Taste of the Far East; 1994: International Cookbook Madhur Jaffrey's A Taste of the Far East; Guild of Food Writers Award * 2004: Cookery Book of the Year The Curry Bible  * 1999: Cookery Book of the Year Madhur Jaffrey’s World Vegetarian International Association of Culinary Professionals Bert Greene Award * 2003 Best Food Journalism in a Magazine Passage to Pakistan, Saveur New York Women in Film & Television Muse Award * 2000: Outstanding Vision and Achievement Governor's New York State Division of Women Award for Excellence 1999; Food Arts magazine Silver Spoon Award 1998 Taraknath Das Foundation Award 1993
- Website: www.madhur-jaffrey.com

Madhur Jaffrey CBE (née Bahadur; born 13 August 1933) is an actress, cookbook and travel writer and television personality. She is recognised for bringing Indian cuisine to the western hemisphere with her debut cookbook, An Invitation to Indian Cooking (1973), which was inducted into the James Beard Foundation's Cookbook Hall of Fame in 2006. She has written over a dozen cookbooks and appeared on several related television programmes, the most notable of which was Madhur Jaffrey's Indian Cookery, which premiered in the UK in 1982. She was the food consultant at the now-closed Dawat, which was considered by many food critics to be among the best Indian restaurants in New York City.

Jaffrey was instrumental in bringing together filmmakers James Ivory and Ismail Merchant, and acted in several of their films, such as Shakespeare Wallah (1965), for which she won the Silver Bear for Best Actress award at the 15th Berlin International Film Festival. She has appeared in dramas on radio, stage and television.

In 2004, she was named a Commander of the Order of the British Empire (CBE) in recognition of her services to cultural relations between the United Kingdom, India and the United States, through her achievements in film, television and cookery. In 2022, she was awarded the Padma Bhushan from the Government of India, which is the third highest civilian award.

Her childhood memoir of India during the final years of the British Raj, Climbing the Mango Trees, was published in 2006.

== Early life ==
Jaffrey was born in Civil Lines, Delhi into a Mathur Kayastha Hindu joint family. She is the fifth of six children of Lala Raj Bans Bahadur (1899–1974) and his wife, Kashmiran Rani (1903–1971).

When Jaffrey was about two years old, her father accepted a position in a family-run concern, Ganesh Flour Mills, and moved to Kanpur. There, Jaffrey attended St. Mary's Convent School. In kindergarten at the age of five, she played the role of the brown mouse in a musical version of the Pied Piper of Hamelin. (Note: Jaffrey 2006, p. 157) The family lived in Kanpur for eight years, moving back to Delhi in 1944.

In Delhi, Jaffrey attended Queen Mary's Higher Secondary School (Note: Jaffrey 2006, p. 114) where her history teacher, Mrs McKelvie, encouraged her to participate in school plays. Jaffrey played Titania in A Midsummer Night's Dream followed by the lead role in Robin Hood and His Merry Men. (Note: Jaffrey 2006, p. 159) Her brothers, Brij Bans Bahadur and Krishen Bans Bahadur, much older than her, went to St. Stephen's College, Delhi. Every winter, St. Stephen's students put on a Shakespeare play that Jaffrey watched from the front row. (Note: Jaffrey 2006, p. 158)

A supporter of Mahatma Gandhi's demand for Indian independence from British rule, Jaffrey spent some time each day spinning khadi, delivering large spools of thread to a collection center in Delhi. (Note: Jaffrey 2006, p. 179)

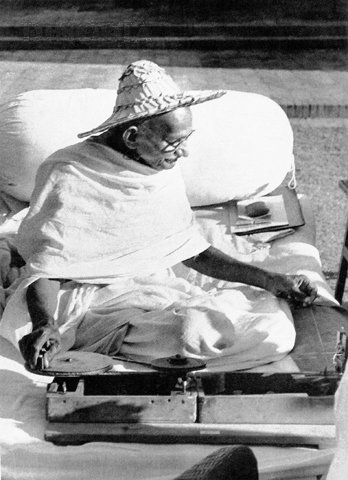
Mahatma Gandhi wearing a Noakhali hat while spinning khadi at Birla House, November 1947.

In 1947, Jaffrey experienced the effects of the partition of India. At school, her classmates divided on the issue: the Muslim girls supported it while the Hindus opposed it. On 15 August she watched the transfer of power at India Gate and got a glimpse of Jawaharlal Nehru and Lord Mountbatten coming down Rajpath in an open horse carriage. The massive migration that began almost immediately afterwards caused riots and killing in Delhi. The male members of her family guarded their house with hunting guns. At school, all her Muslim classmates left without a farewell. In 1948, a few days before Mahatma Gandhi was shot dead, she attended one of his prayer meetings at Birla House and sang bhajans. She heard the news of his assassination on the radio, followed by Jawaharlal Nehru's address later that night, "the light has gone out of our lives, and there is darkness everywhere". She saw Gandhi's funeral procession and witnessed his cremation. (Note: Jaffrey 2006, p. 178)

At home, Jaffrey's family primarily ate food prepared by servants but supervised by the women of the family. They occasionally indulged in Mughlai cuisine bought in the bylanes of Old Delhi, like bedmi aloo, seekh kebab, shami kebab, rumali roti and bakarkhani. (Note: Jaffrey 2006, p. 188) Refugees from Punjab who settled in Delhi after partition brought their own style of cooking. Moti Mahal, a dhaba in Daryaganj, introduced tandoori chicken and went on to invent butter chicken and dal makhani. Jaffrey found Punjabi food's simplicity and freshness enticing and routinely picked up some tandoori chicken from Moti Mahal for family picnics. (Note: Jaffrey 2006, p. 191)

At school, the subject of domestic science included learning dishes like blancmange, whose bland taste drove Jaffrey to dismiss the lessons as preparing "British invalid foods from circa 1930". (Note: Jaffrey 2006, p. 203) However, for her practical examination, her class was asked to make a dish from an assortment of potatoes, tomatoes, onions, garlic, ginger and Indian spices in a pot over wood to be lit with matches. Jaffrey did her best but guessed that she failed the subject of domestic science altogether. (Note: Jaffrey 2006, p. 229)

Jaffrey regularly answered requests from the nearby All India Radio station for parts in radio plays or children's programmes. As she was paid a small fee for each session, she considered this her first professional work. (Note: Jaffrey 2006, p. 220)

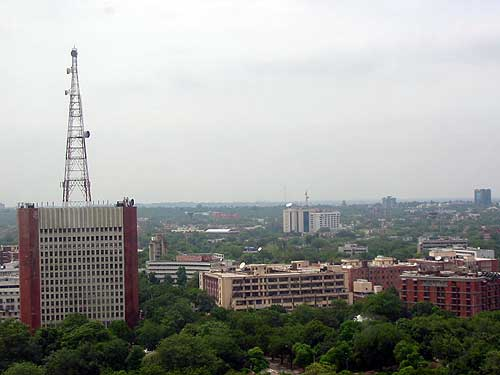
All India Radio station at Akashvani Bhavan in New Delhi.

Meanwhile, her father had moved to Daurala as general manager of Daurala Sugar Works, a factory owned by family friends, the Shri Ram family. Jaffrey and most of the family remained behind in Delhi to avoid disrupting the children's education. (Note: Jaffrey 2006, p. 123) Her elder sisters were at boarding school in Nainital. (Note: Jaffrey 2006, p. 164) In the letters that they exchanged with their siblings and cousins at Delhi, they addressed each other only by their initials. This tradition cemented over time so that Jaffrey became M for her circle of close friends and family. (Note: Jaffrey 2006, p. 165)

== Delhi (1950–1955) ==
From 1950 to 1953, Jaffrey attended Miranda House, a women's college, where she gained a B.A. honours degree in English with a minor in philosophy.

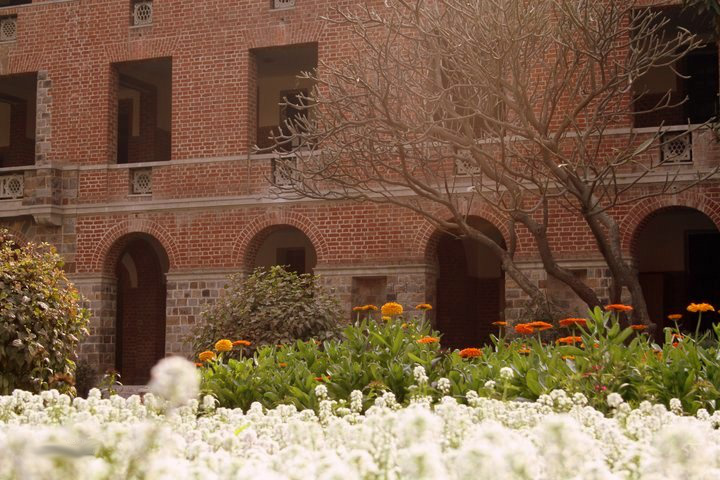
Miranda House in New Delhi.

She took part in her college's all-women productions of Shakespeare's Hamlet and Oscar Wilde's The Importance of Being Earnest. (Note: Jaffrey 2006, p. 240)

In 1951, Jaffrey joined the Unity Theatre, an English-language repertory company founded by Saeed Jaffrey in New Delhi. She auditioned for the role of the Queen's Reader in Jean Cocteau's play The Eagle Has Two Heads just four days before the opening and was cast in the role.

After graduation from Miranda House in 1953, Jaffrey joined All India Radio, where Saeed Jaffrey was an announcer. She worked as a disc jockey at night. Saeed and Jaffrey fell in love, and dated at Gaylord, a restaurant in Connaught Place.

During this period, Jaffrey met Ruth Prawer Jhabvala, a British novelist who had moved to Civil Lines, Delhi after marriage to Cyrus Jhabvala, an Indian architect, in 1951. Jaffrey answered a casting call by Ruth Prawer Jhabvala and worked with her on All India Radio plays. The protagonists of Prawer Jhabvala's first novel, To Whom She Will (1955), a young couple who work at a radio station in Delhi and fall in love, were based on Madhur and Saeed Jaffrey. The novel was published in America the following year as Amrita (1956).

In early 1955, Jaffrey was in the audience at St. Stephen's College, Delhi for a programme of literary readings by Sybil Thorndike and Lewis Casson, married English actors who toured internationally in Shakespearean productions. Later that year, the Unity Theatre put on a performance of Tennessee Williams' one-act play, Auto-da-Fé, in which Jaffrey played the rigidly moralistic mother to Saeed's young postal worker, Eloi. The last play that Jaffrey did with Saeed was Othello, in which Saeed was cast as Iago, while Jaffrey played Iago's wife Emilia. (Note: Jaffrey 2006, p. 242)

Jaffrey decided to pursue acting as a profession. She won a grant from the British government that she could use to pay for education at the Royal Academy of Dramatic Art.

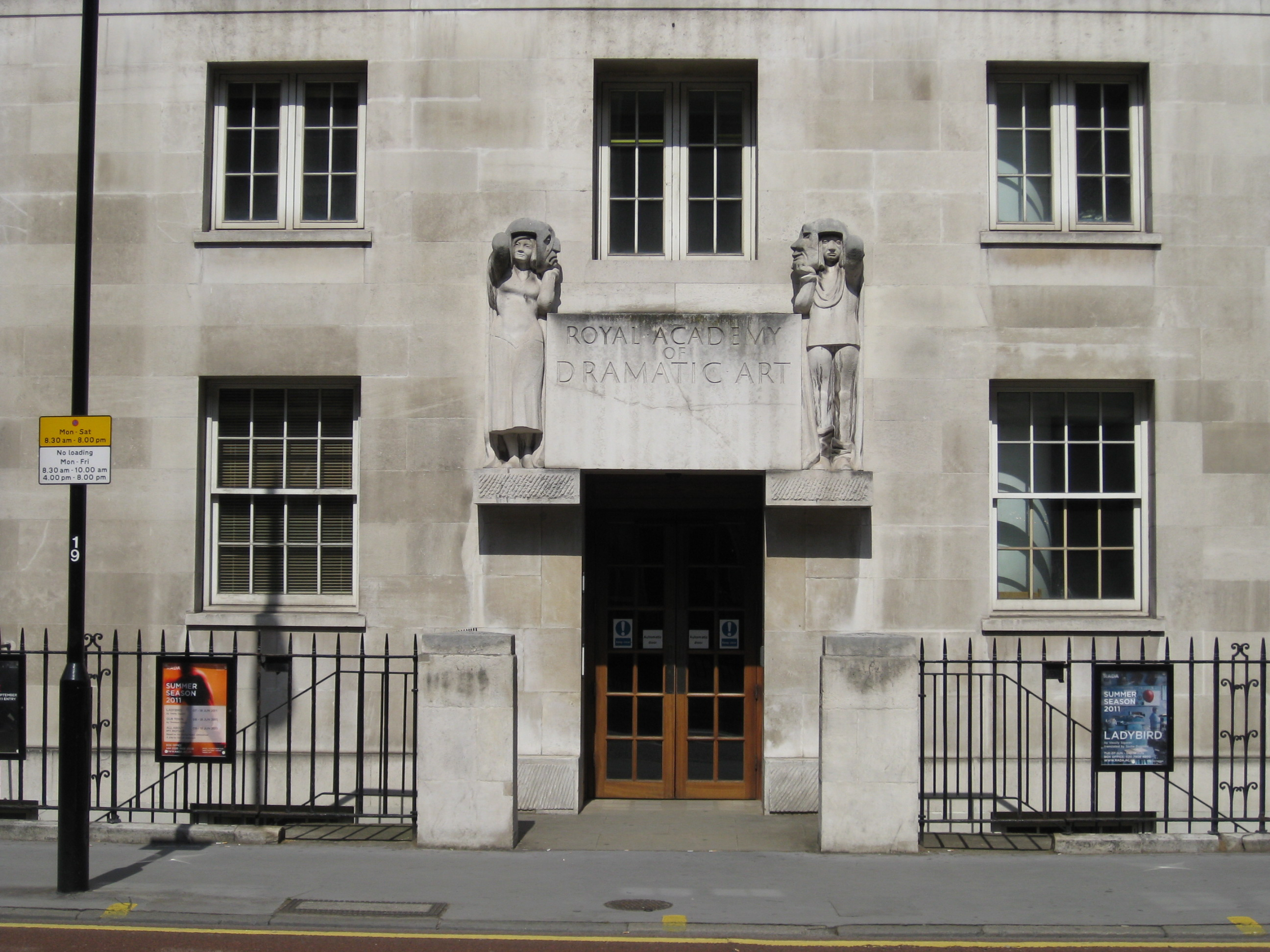
The Royal Academy of Dramatic Art at 62 Gower Street, London WC1E 6ED.

The head of the British Council in India was impressed by her performance in Auto-da-Fé and offered her a scholarship. Armed with these two sources of money, Jaffrey arrived at Southampton on 6 December 1955 on the P&O liner RMS Strathmore from Bombay.

== London (1955–1957) ==
Jaffrey joined the Royal Academy of Dramatic Art (RADA) with Diana Rigg, Siân Phillips and Glenda Jackson as her contemporaries. She won a scholarship from RADA after an audition. This supplemented her earlier grant and scholarship. She picked up some minor acting roles on BBC television and radio. Her father sent her a small amount of money periodically, and her total income proved sufficient to live modestly in London. She rented rooms from at least two different landlords before settling down in a bedsit in Brent with a young Jewish family, the Golds, who allowed her to use their kitchen and their utensils to cook her own food. Her landlady, Blanche Gold, was roughly her age. Blanche had one child and was pregnant.

Jaffrey found the food served at the RADA canteen along with the Indian restaurants in London unappetising. In an interview with NPR, she recalled the canteen serving "gray" roast beef and overcooked cabbage with watery potatoes: "I would look at it and say, 'How can I eat this?!'." She wrote to her mother, begging her for recipes of the home cooked meals of her childhood. Her mother responded with recipes written in Hindi on onionskin paper in letters sent via airmail. The very first letter was dated 19 March 1956 and included recipes for meat spiced with cinnamon, cardamom and bay, a cauliflower dish, and egg curry with hard-boiled eggs. The first recipe that she tried was jeera aloo (potatoes with cumin). She bought pumpernickel from a neighbourhood Jewish bakery as a substitute for chapatis.

In late 1955, Saeed Jaffrey won a Fulbright scholarship to study drama in America the following year. In spring 1956, he approached Jaffrey's parents in Delhi for her hand in marriage but they refused because they felt that his financial prospects as an actor did not appear sound. Jaffrey got her father's permission to marry Saeed eventually. In summer 1956, Saeed flew to London on his way to America and proposed to Jaffrey. She refused but gave him a tour of RADA where she pointed out English actors, such as Peter O'Toole, whom she thought would soon have a high profile in the profession. Soon afterwards, Saeed boarded the RMS Queen Elizabeth to sail across the Atlantic from Southampton to New York City.

In 1957 Jaffrey graduated from RADA with honours. Not knowing whether to stay on in London, join a repertory company or go back to India, she wrote to Saeed describing her dilemma. Saeed had just graduated from Catholic University of America's Department of Speech and Drama and had been selected to act in summer stock plays at St. Michael's Playhouse in Winooski, Vermont. Seeing Saeed troubled by Jaffrey's letter, Gilbert V. Hartke, the department head at Catholic University, arranged for Jaffrey to teach pantomime at St. Michael's Playhouse, Winooski that summer. Hartke arranged for her to go to Catholic University on a partial scholarship and work at the Drama School library in order to meet her living expenses. After gaining her American work visa, Jaffrey sailed across the Atlantic on the RMS Queen Mary to join Saeed at Winooski.

== New York City (1958–1969) ==
In September 1957 Jaffrey stayed in Washington, D.C., with Saeed, who had returned there to rehearse for the 1957–58 season with the National Players, a professional touring company that performed classical plays all over America. Midway through the tour, Saeed returned to Washington, D.C. from Miami to marry Jaffrey in a modest civil ceremony.

In September 1958, Ismail Merchant arrived from Bombay to attend the New York University Stern School of Business. Merchant had heard of Saeed from his theater days in Delhi. He himself wanted to produce plays and make movies. Saeed was then playing the lead at Lee Strasberg's Actors Studio in an Off-Broadway production of Blood Wedding, a tragedy by Spanish dramatist Federico García Lorca. Merchant approached Saeed with a proposal to put on a Broadway production of The Little Clay Cart, starring the Jaffreys. Saeed took him home for dinner, where he met Jaffrey, who was heavily pregnant with her first child.

The following year, James Ivory, then an emerging film maker from California, approached Saeed Jaffrey to provide the narration for his short film about Indian miniature painting, The Sword and the Flute (1959). Saeed brought Ivory home for dinner and introduced him to Jaffrey. When The Sword and the Flute screened in New York City in 1961, the Jaffreys encouraged Merchant to attend the screening, where he met Ivory for the first time. They subsequently met regularly at the Jaffreys' dinners and cemented their relationship into a lifetime partnership, both personal and professional. The Jaffreys planned to go back to India, start a travelling company and tour with it. They often discussed this idea with James Ivory and started writing a script in his brownstone on East 64th Street.

The Jaffreys soon expanded their social circle to include other members of the Indian community in New York City who were involved in the arts. They regularly hosted large dinners cooked by Jaffrey, who was determined to master everything, including biryani and pulao.

In 1962, Jaffrey and Saeed appeared in Rolf Forsberg's Off-Broadway production of A Tenth of an Inch Makes The Difference. Their performance was described by The New York Times drama critic, Milton Esterow, as "sensitive acting" that made up "the brightest part of the evening". The pay for such roles was generally $10/hour.

By 1965, the Jaffreys' marriage had collapsed. Jaffrey arranged for their children to live with her parents and sister in Delhi while Jaffrey went to Mexico for the formal divorce proceedings.

Jaffrey travelled to India for the shooting of Shakespeare Wallah (1965). After the film's shooting was complete, she lived in India with her children until Ismail Merchant decided that she needed to be at the Berlin International Film Festival because he had entered the film in competition there. In Berlin, she won the Silver Bear for Best Actress award. Sanford Allen, a violinist she had met when she was a guide at the Lincoln Center for the Performing Arts in New York City, sent her a bunch of roses on her win.

In 1966 Ismail Merchant, in search of further publicity for the film, decided to cultivate The New York Times food critic Craig Claiborne. He persuaded Claiborne to profile Jaffrey as an actress who could cook. When Claiborne agreed, Jaffrey borrowed a friend's apartment in which to meet him since she felt she could not do so in the one-bedroom apartment on Eleventh Street that she shared with Allen. She rearranged the furniture in the borrowed apartment and made stuffed green peppers, koftas in sour cream and cucumber raita.

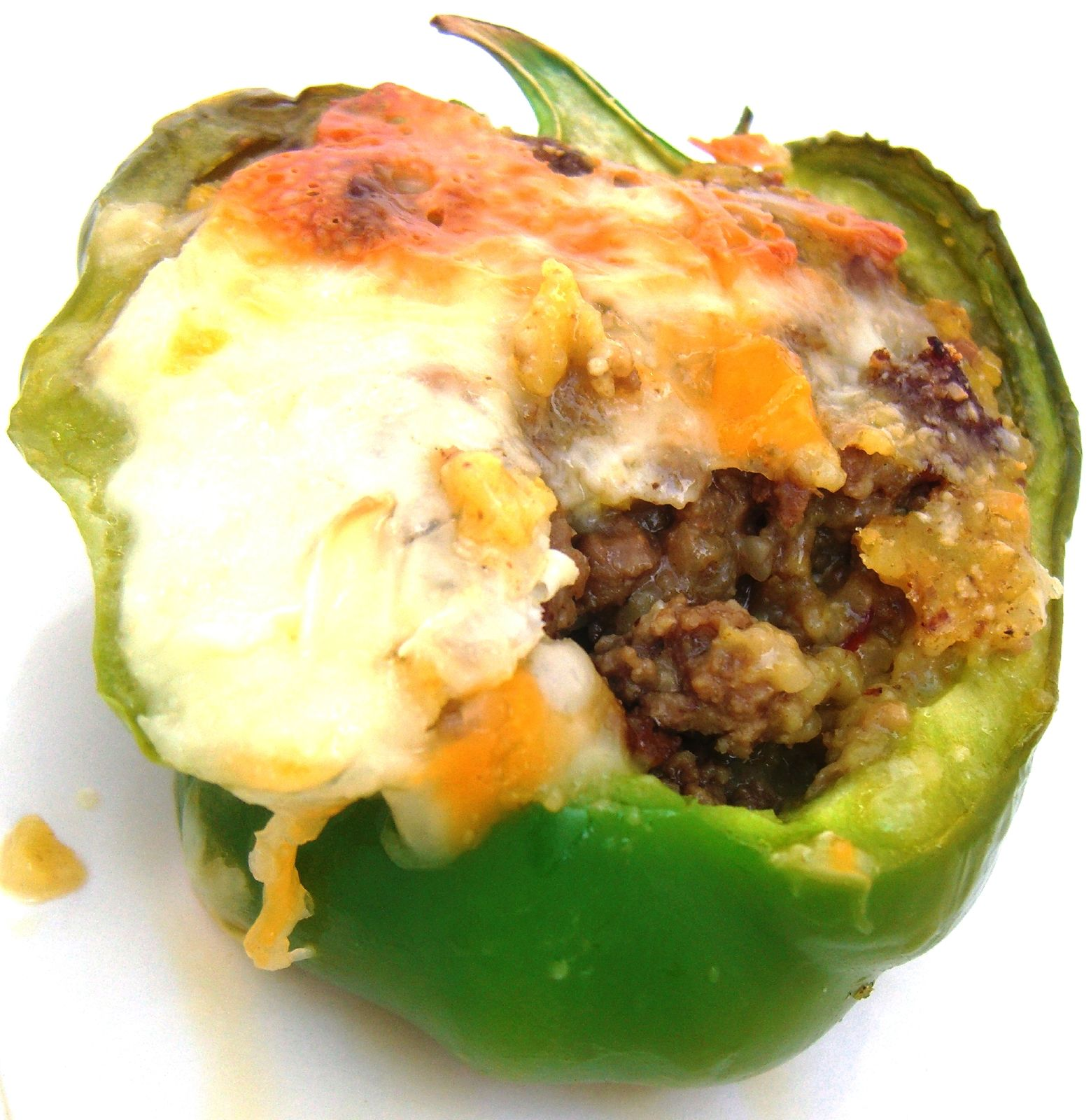
Stuffed green peppers

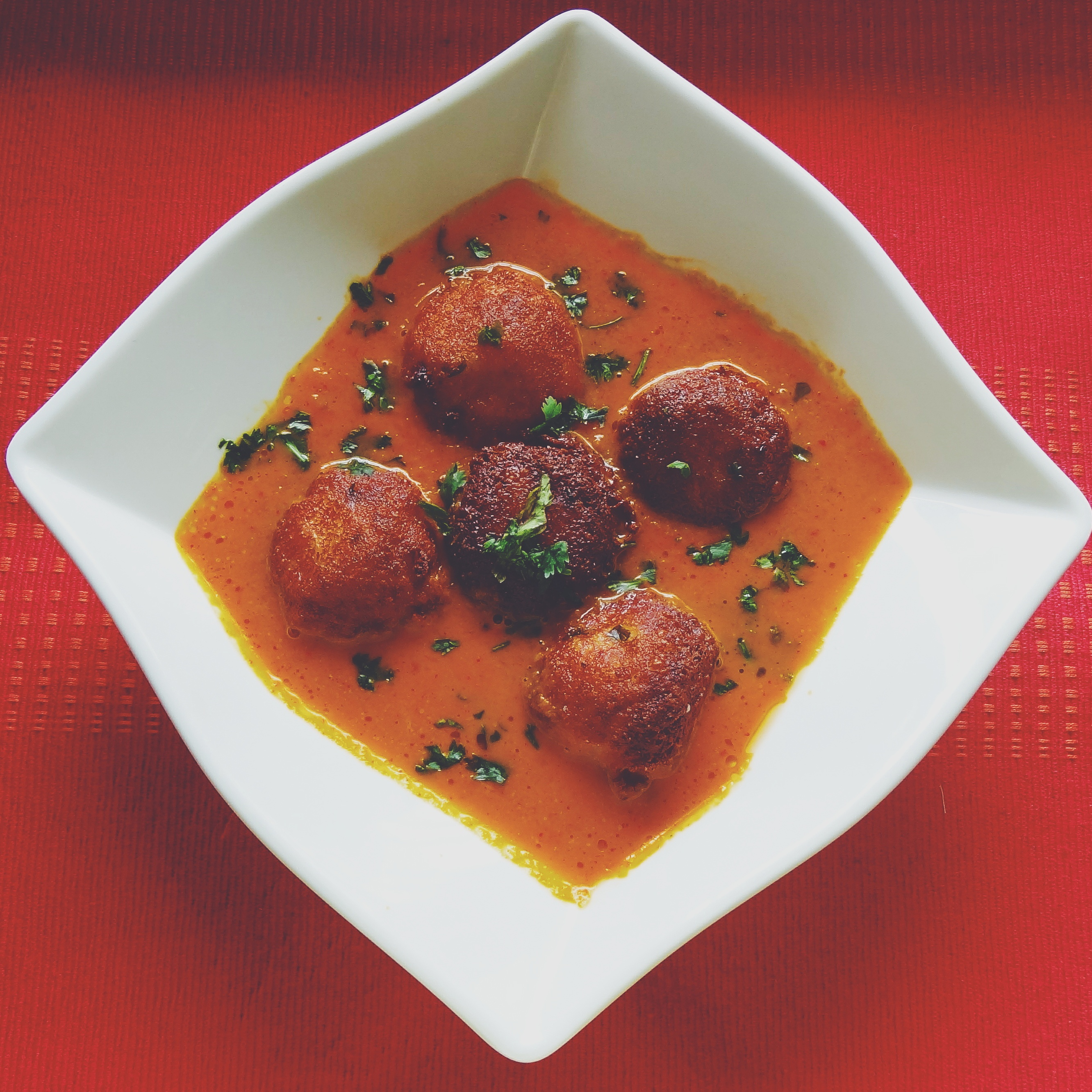
Koftas in sour cream

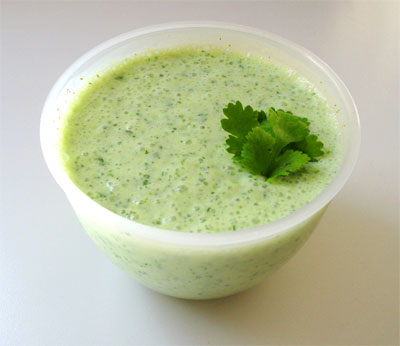
Cucumber raita with mint

In 1967, Jaffrey travelled to India to attend a black-tie premiere of Shakespeare Wallah in Delhi hosted by the British High Commissioner to India, John Freeman and his wife, Catherine. At the premiere she met Marlon Brando, an actor Jaffrey admired deeply for his method acting technique. Brando was in India to raise money for UNICEF and the film premiere served as a fundraiser. Later that year, Jaffrey shot scenes for Merchant Ivory's next film, The Guru (1969). She returned from India with her children. The family, along with Sanford Allen, moved into a 14th-floor apartment in a Greenwich Village co-op. To better provide for her children, she became a freelance writer for food and travel magazines, covering subjects as diverse as paintings, music, dance, drama, sculpture and architecture.

In 1969, Jaffrey married Sanford Allen, who at the time was a violinist with the New York Philharmonic Orchestra.

== Merchant Ivory films ==
Jaffrey was instrumental in introducing the filmmakers James Ivory and Ismail Merchant to each other.

When Merchant and Ivory went to India to make The Householder (1963) they met Shashi Kapoor and his in-laws, the Kendals. Geoffrey Kendal and his wife, Laura Liddell, had a traveling theatre company, Shakespeareana, which performed plays by Shakespeare pan India. Combining the Jaffreys' original idea with the real-life Shakespeareana, Merchant and Ivory came up with their next film Shakespeare Wallah (1965). Ruth Prawer Jhabvala was persuaded to write a movie star role for Jaffrey. Saeed was dropped from the project because the Jaffreys' marriage had collapsed.

When Jaffrey travelled to India for the shooting of Shakespeare Wallah, her first shots were in Kasauli, a hill station. The hairpin bends on the drive there caused her nausea and vomiting, leading the crew to despair that a person so petite and sickly could ever play a glamorous film star. Kenneth Tynan, a film critic for The Observer, described her performance as "a ravishing study in felinity".

She went on to act in further Merchant Ivory films like The Guru (1969), Autobiography of a Princess (1976), Heat and Dust (1983) and The Perfect Murder (1988). She starred as the title character in their film Cotton Mary (1999) and co-directed it with Merchant.

== Other films and television ==
Jaffrey has appeared in Six Degrees of Separation (1993), Vanya on 42nd Street (1994), Flawless (1999) and Prime (2005). She starred in and produced ABCD (1999). She played a role in the horror short film Grasp in 2002, written and directed by Brendan Donovan. In the 2009 Psych episode "Bollywood Homicide," Jaffrey played an Indian grandmother whose food is too spicy for the main characters to handle. In 1985, she was in the Hindi film Saagar where she played the role of Kamladevi, Rishi Kapoor's grandmother. Between 1992–94, she appeared with Billie Whitelaw in the British television series Firm Friends. In 1999, she appeared with daughter Sakina Jaffrey in the film Chutney Popcorn. In Cosmopolitan (2003), a film broadcast on PBS, she played a traditional Hindu wife who suddenly leaves her husband. She starred alongside Deborah Kerr in the 1985 movie The Assam Garden. In 2009, she appeared with Aasif Mandvi in Today's Special, adapted from Mandvi's play about a celebrated sous chef who is forced to run his father's tandoori restaurant in Queens. In 2012, she played a doctor in A Late Quartet who diagnoses Christopher Walken's character with Parkinson's disease.

== Theatre and other discography ==
In 1962, she appeared in A Tenth of an Inch Makes the Difference by Rolf Forsberg. In 1969, she appeared in The Guide, based on the novel by R. K. Narayan, and in 1970, she appeared in Conduct Unbecoming, written by Barry England.

In 1993, she appeared in Two Rooms by Lee Blessing. In 1999, she appeared in Last Dance at Dum Dum by Ayub Khan-Din. In 2004, Jaffrey appeared in Bombay Dreams on Broadway, where she played the main character's grandmother, Shanti.

In April 2019, Jaffrey starred in Nani, a rap music video by Zohran Mamdani, then a hip-hop MC under the stage name Mr. Cardamom (after the spice cardamom).

== Cooking ==
Jaffrey, who lives in Manhattan and has a home in upstate New York, is the author of many cookbooks of Indian, Asian and world vegetarian cuisines. Several of these have become best-sellers; some have won James Beard Foundation awards. She has presented a cooking series on television, including Madhur Jaffrey's Indian Cookery in 1982, Madhur Jaffrey's Far Eastern Cookery in 1989 and Madhur Jaffrey's Flavours of India in 1995. As a result of the success of her cookbooks and TV, Jaffrey developed a line of mass-marketed cooking sauces for Tilda.

Ironically, she did not cook at all as a child growing up in Delhi. She had almost never been in the kitchen and almost failed cooking at school. It was only after she went to London at the age of 19 to study at RADA that she learned how to cook, using recipes of familiar dishes that were provided in correspondence from her mother. (Note: Jaffrey, Madhur, Madhur Jaffrey's Indian Cooking, Barron's Educational Series, 1983. ISBN 978-0-8120-6548-0.) Her editor Judith Jones claimed in her memoirs that Jaffrey was an ideal cookbook writer precisely because she had learned to cook childhood comfort food as an adult, and primarily from written instructions. In the 1960s, after her award-winning performance in Shakespeare Wallah, Jaffrey became known as the "actress who could cook".

After an article about her and her cooking appeared in The New York Times in 1966, she received a book contract from an independent editor to write a book on Indian cooking. Jaffrey started compiling all the recipes learnt by her through correspondence with her mother and adapted for the American kitchen. Due to a period of rapid consolidation in the American publishing industry, the book went to Harcourt Brace Jovanovich but got no attention there either. Jaffrey took the book to her friend, Ved Mehta, who in turn mentioned it to publisher André Schiffrin. Schiffrin passed on the book to Knopf editor Judith Jones, who had championed Julia Child's cookbook at a time when no other publisher would touch it. Judith Jones snapped up the book immediately, only asking Jaffrey to add serving suggestions and menus for people not familiar with Indian cooking. In 1973 An Invitation to Indian Cooking was published, Jaffrey's first cookbook. During the 1970s, she taught classes in Indian cooking, both at the James A. Beard School of Cooking and in her Manhattan apartment. She was hired by the BBC to present a show on Indian cooking. In 1986, the restaurant Dawat opened in Manhattan using recipes that she provided.

The social historian Panikos Panayi, writing about English cuisine, described her as the doyen of Indian cookery writers, but noted that their and her influence remained limited to Indian cuisine. Panayi commented that despite Jaffrey's description of "most Indian restaurants in Britain as 'second-class establishments that had managed to underplay their own regional uniqueness'", most of her dishes too "do not appear on dining tables in India".

== Awards ==
- Best Actress from the Berlin International Film Festival in 1965 for her performance in Shakespeare Wallah.
- Taraknath Das Foundation Award presented by the Taraknath Das Foundation of the Southern Asian Institute of Columbia University in 1993.
- Her cookbooks have received a total of six James Beard Foundation Awards, and one additional nomination. She also was named "Who's Who" in 1995 and received the "Lifetime Achievement Award" in 2023.
- Muse Award presented by New York Women in Film & Television in 2000.
- CBE awarded on 11 October 2004 "in recognition of her services to cultural relations between the United Kingdom, India and the United States, through her achievements in film, television and cookery".
- 33rd Filmfare Awards – Filmfare Award for Best Supporting Actress – Saagar (nominated)
- In 2022, she was awarded the Padma Bhushan from the Government of India, which is the third highest civilian award.

== Family ==
Jaffrey has three daughters from her marriage to Saeed Jaffrey: Zia, Meera and Sakina. Saeed Jaffrey's autobiography Saeed: An Actor's Journey (1998) describes their relationship in the early years of his life.

Zia Jaffrey is a part-time assistant professor of creative writing at The New School in New York City. She has written for newspapers including the The New York Times and The Washington Post. Her work has appeared in magazines such as The Nation, Vogue and Elle. She is the author of The Invisibles: A Tale of Eunuchs of India (1996) that explores the hijra community, whom she first encountered at a family wedding in Delhi in 1984. In 2013, she published The New Apartheid, a book on South Africa's AIDS epidemic.

Meera Jaffrey graduated from Oberlin College, Ohio with a major in Chinese studies. She teaches in the Music Department of the Learning Community Charter School in Jersey City, New Jersey. In 2005 she traveled to China to shoot a documentary film, Fine Rain: Politics and Folk Songs in China, that explores China through its folk songs. Meera is married to Craig Bombardiere and the two have a son, Rohan Jaffrey.

Sakina Jaffrey picked up her love of Chinese culture from her elder sister, Meera. She graduated from Vassar College, New York with a major in Chinese studies and lived in Taiwan in her twenties. She is an actress, best known for her role as Linda Vasquez in the American television series House of Cards. She lives in Nyack, New York, with her husband, Francis Wilkinson, a journalist, and their two children.

Madhur Jaffrey is the aunt of the British journalist Rohit Jaggi and his sister, the literary critic Maya Jaggi, their mother being Jaffrey's eldest sister, Lalit.

Jaffrey was cousin to Raghu Raj Bahadur (1924–1997), considered to be one of the world's top theoretical statisticians, and his sister, Sheila Dhar (1929–2001). In her memoirs Here's Someone I'd Like You to Meet (1995), Sheila Dhar recounts her difficult relationship with her father, referred to as Shibbudada in Jaffrey's own memoirs, Climbing the Mango Trees.

== Bibliography ==
=== Cookbooks ===
- An Invitation to Indian Cooking (1973) (James Beard Foundation Awards Cookbook Hall of Fame winner) – ISBN 978-0-224-01152-5
- Madhur Jaffrey's World of the East Vegetarian Cooking (1981) – ISBN 978-0-394-40271-0
- Madhur Jaffrey's Indian Cooking (1973) – ISBN 978-0-8120-6548-0
- Eastern Vegetarian Cooking (1983) – ISBN 978-0-09-977720-5
- A Taste of India (1988) – ISBN 978-1-86205-098-3
- Madhur Jaffrey's Cookbook: Easy East/West Menus for Family and Friends (1989) – ISBN 978-0-330-30635-5
- Indian Cooking (1989) – ISBN 978-0-600-56363-1
- A Taste of the Far East (1993) (James Beard Foundation Awards Cookbook of the Year winner) – ISBN 978-0-517-59548-0
- Madhur Jaffrey's Spice Kitchen (1993) – ISBN 978-0-517-59698-2
- Madhur Jaffrey's Indian Recipes (1994) – ISBN 978-1-85793-397-0
- Entertaining With Madhur Jaffrey (1994) – ISBN 978-1-85793-369-7
- Madhur Jaffrey's Flavors of India: Classics and New Discoveries (1995) – ISBN 978-0-517-70012-9
- Cookbook Food for Family and Friends (1995) – ISBN 978-1-85813-154-2
- Madhur Jaffrey's Quick & Easy Indian Cooking (1996) – ISBN 978-0-8118-5901-1
- The Madhur Jaffrey Cookbook: Over 650 Indian, Vegetarian and Eastern Recipes (1996) – ISBN 978-1-85501-268-4
- Madhur Jaffrey's Illustrated Indian Cookery (1996) – ISBN 978-0-563-38303-1
- Madhur Jaffrey Cooks Curries (1996) – ISBN 978-0-563-38794-7
- Madhur Jaffrey's Complete Vegetarian Cookbook (1998) – ISBN 978-0-09-186364-7
- Madhur Jaffrey's World Vegetarian (1999) (James Beard Foundation Awards winner) – ISBN 978-0-517-59632-6
- The Essential Madhur Jaffrey (1999) – ISBN 978-0-09-187174-1
- Madhur Jaffrey's Step-by-Step Cooking (2001) (James Beard Foundation Awards winner) – ISBN 978-0-06-621402-3
- Foolproof Indian Cooking: Step by Step to Everyone's Favorite Indian Recipes (2002) – ISBN 978-1-55366-258-7
- Madhur Jaffrey Indian Cooking (2003) – ISBN 978-0-09-188408-6
- From Curries to Kebabs: Recipes from the Indian Spice Trail (2003) (James Beard Foundation Awards winner) – ISBN 978-0-609-60704-6
- Madhur Jaffrey's Ultimate Curry Bible (2003) – ISBN 978-0-09-187415-5
- Simple Indian Cookery (2005) – ISBN 978-0-563-52183-9
- At Home with Madhur Jaffrey: Simple Delectable Dishes from India, Pakistan, Bangladesh, and Sri Lanka (2010) – ISBN 978-0-307-26824-2
- Curry Easy (2010) – ISBN 978-0-09-192314-3
- My Kitchen Table: 100 Essential Curries (2011) – ISBN 978-0-09-194052-2
- Vegetarian India: A Journey Through the Best of Indian Home Cooking (2015) (James Beard Foundation Awards nominee) – ISBN 978-1101874868
- Madhur Jaffrey's Instantly Indian Cookbook: Modern and Classic Recipes for the Instant Pot® (2019) – ISBN 978-0-525-65579-4

=== Children's books ===
- Seasons of Splendour: Tales, Myths, and Legends of India (Pavilion, 1985) illustrated by Michael Foreman – ISBN 978-0-340377260
- Market Days: From Market to Market Around the World (1995) illustrated by Marti Shohet – ISBN 978-0-8167-3504-4
- Robi Dobi: The Marvelous Adventures of an Indian Elephant (1997) illustrated by Amanda Hall – ISBN 978-0-8037-2193-7

=== Memoirs ===
- Climbing the Mango Trees: A Memoir of a Childhood in India (2006) – ISBN 978-1-4000-4295-1
- "Sweet memory". First Tastes. August 19 & 26, 2002. The New Yorker. 97 (27): 35. 6 September 2021.

== Sources ==
- Jaffrey, Madhur (2006). Climbing the Mango Trees. Alfred A. Knopf. ISBN 978-1400042951.
- Jaffrey, Saeed (1998). Saeed: An Actor's Journey. Constable & Robinson. ISBN 978-0094767706.
