= P. N. Dhar =

Indian economist

Prithvi Nath Dhar

2nd Principal Secretary to the Prime Minister of India
- In office 1973–1977
- Preceded by: P. N. Haksar
- Succeeded by: V. Shankar

Personal details
- Born: 1 March 1919 Jammu and Kashmir, British India
- Died: 19 July 2012 (aged 93) New Delhi, Delhi, India
- Education: Hindu College, University of Delhi

Prithvi Nath Dhar (P.N. Dhar, 1 March 1919 – 19 July 2012) was an Indian economist, the head of Indira Gandhi's secretariat and one of her closest advisers.

== Early life and career ==
P. N. Dhar was born into a Kashmiri Pandit family in 1919 to Dr. Vishnu Hakim and Radha Hakim. His wife was the singer-writer Sheila Dhar. He attended Tyndale Biscoe School in Srinagar, India, and then studied economics at the Hindu College of the University of Delhi.

Dhar served as principal secretary to Prime Minister Indira Gandhi during the tumultuous days of the Emergency (1973–1977). He was one of her close advisors, who were collectively known as the "Kashmiri Mafia".

He was also a professor of economics at Delhi University for many years and the director and emeritus professor of the Institute of Economic Growth in New Delhi.

He was one of the founders of the Delhi School of Economics. He served as the United Nations assistant secretary general, research and policy analysis, in New York from 1978 to 1986.

He was awarded the Padma Vibushan, India's second highest civilian award in 2008.

His memoir, Indira Gandhi, the Emergency, and Indian Democracy was published in 2000.
