= IIT Indore =

Public engineering institution in India

Coordinates: 22.526°N 75.923°E

Indian Institute of Technology Indore
- Bhāratīya Praudyogikī Sansthān Indaur
- Motto: Jñānam Sarvajana-hitāya
- Motto in English: Knowledge for the benefit of all
- Type: Public technical university
- Established: 2009 (17 years ago)
- Chairman: K. Sivan
- Director: Suhas S. Joshi
- Academic staff: 204
- Students: 2,323
- Undergraduates: 1,343
- Postgraduates: 370
- Doctoral students: 610
- Location: Indore, Madhya Pradesh, India
- Campus: Sub-Urban 501.42 acres (2.0292 km^{2})
- Colours: Blue
- Website: www.iiti.ac.in

The Indian Institute of Technology Indore (IIT Indore or IITI) is an Institute of national importance located in Indore, Madhya Pradesh, India. IIT Indore was founded in the year 2009. It was one of the eight new Indian Institutes of Technology (IITs) started by the government of India in the year 2009. IIT Indore is officially recognized as an Institute of National Importance by the Government of India.

== History ==
Founded in 2009, it is one of the eight new Indian Institutes of Technology (IITs) established by the Ministry of Human Resource Development, Government of India under The Institutes of Technology (Amendment) Act, 2011 which declares eight new IITs as well as the conversion of Institute of Technology, Banaras Hindu University as IIT. The Act was passed in the Lok Sabha on 24 March 2011 and by the Rajya Sabha on 30 April 2012. Arjun Singh, the then HRD minister of India laid the foundation stone of IIT Indore on 17 February 2009 in its permanent campus located in Simrol, Indore, Madhya Pradesh. The institute worked from 2009 to 2010 in a temporary campus at Institute of Engineering and Technology of Devi Ahilya Vishwavidyalaya under mentorship of IIT Bombay with Dr. Pradeep Mathur as the founding director. The first batch of IIT Indore graduated in 2013, and the institute celebrated its first Convocation Day on 8 June 2013. Dr. Suhas Joshi, Professor of Mechanical Engineering and Dean of Alumni & Corporate relations at IIT Bombay has been appointed as the new director at IIT Indore who succeeds the officiating director, Dr. Neelesh Kumar Jain.

== Campus ==
IIT Indore is located at Simrol, Khandwa Road. This is in the Dr Ambedkar Nagar Mhow tehsil of Indore district. The campus sprawls across 501.42 acres. IIT Indore moved from the two rented campuses to its permanent campus in Simrol in October 2015.

=== Learning Resource Centre (LRC) ===
IIT Indore's Central Library, the Learning Resource Centre is equipped with Online Information Resources. The library provides its users access to nearly Books - 41,500+, Theses and Dissertations - 1320+, E-Books - 8050+, E-Journals Self Subscribed - 2510+, E-Journals through ONOS - 13,000+. Databases - 12 as well as access to databases such as ACM Digital Library, IEEE Xplore digital library, Science Direct, JSTOR, SciFinder, Taylor and Francis, Wiley, and Springer. The library also provides air-conditioned and Wi-Fi enabled Reading Halls.

=== Halls of Residence ===
Most students at IIT Indore reside in the halls of residence. The campus has five halls of residence named A.P.J. Abdul Kalam, Homi Jehangir Bhabha, Vikram Sarabhai, C.V. Raman, and Devi Ahilya. The Devi Ahilya Hall of Residence is exclusively for the accommodation of women. Students are provided 5 BHK units to accommodate 5 students with one student per bedroom.

=== Health Centre ===
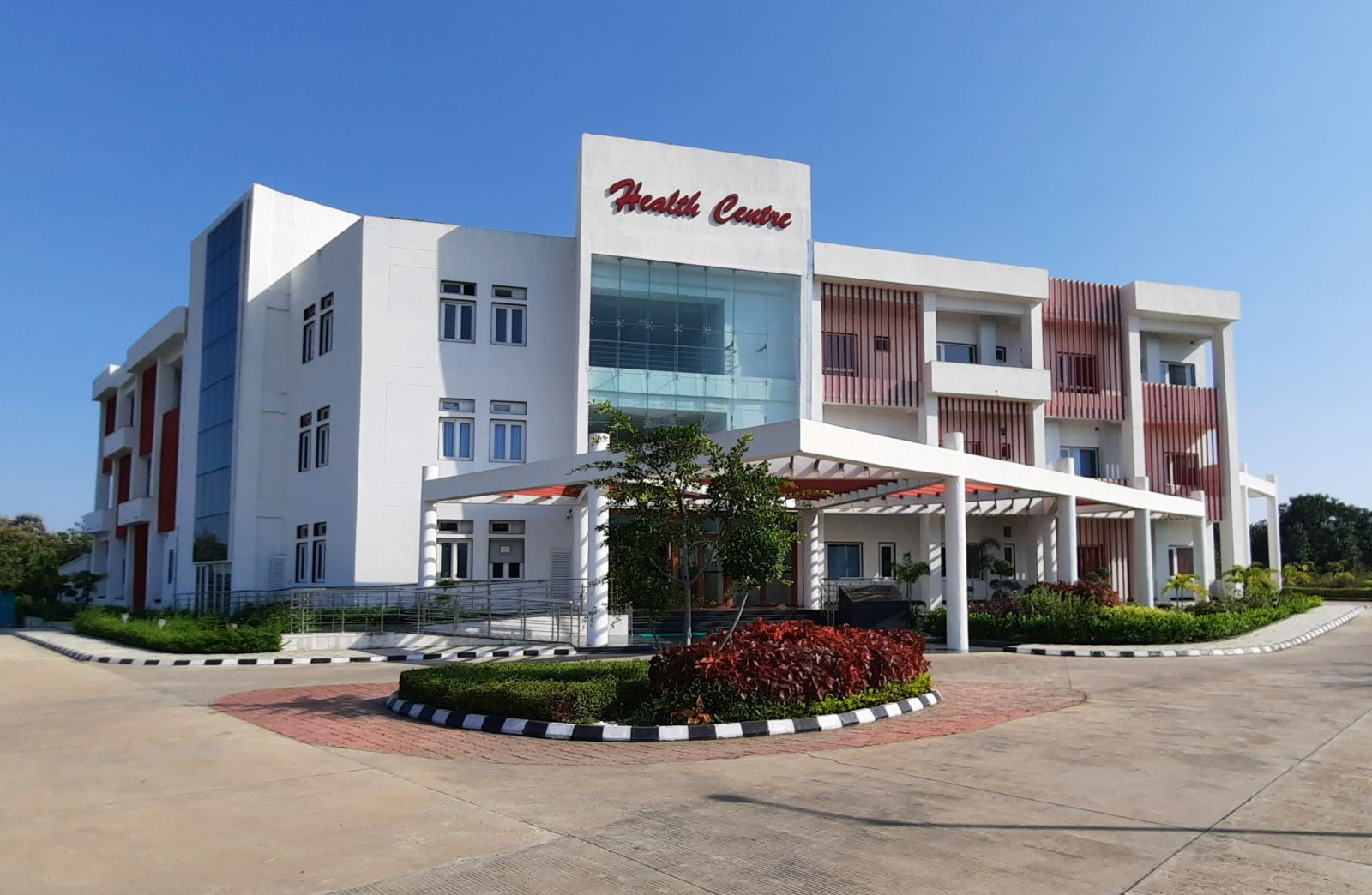
Front view of Health Centre

IIT Indore's Health Centre provides health services to the students, faculties, employees, guests and to the entire IIT Indore community. Some expert consultants or doctors visit the Health Centre for better treatment of the community once or twice a week.

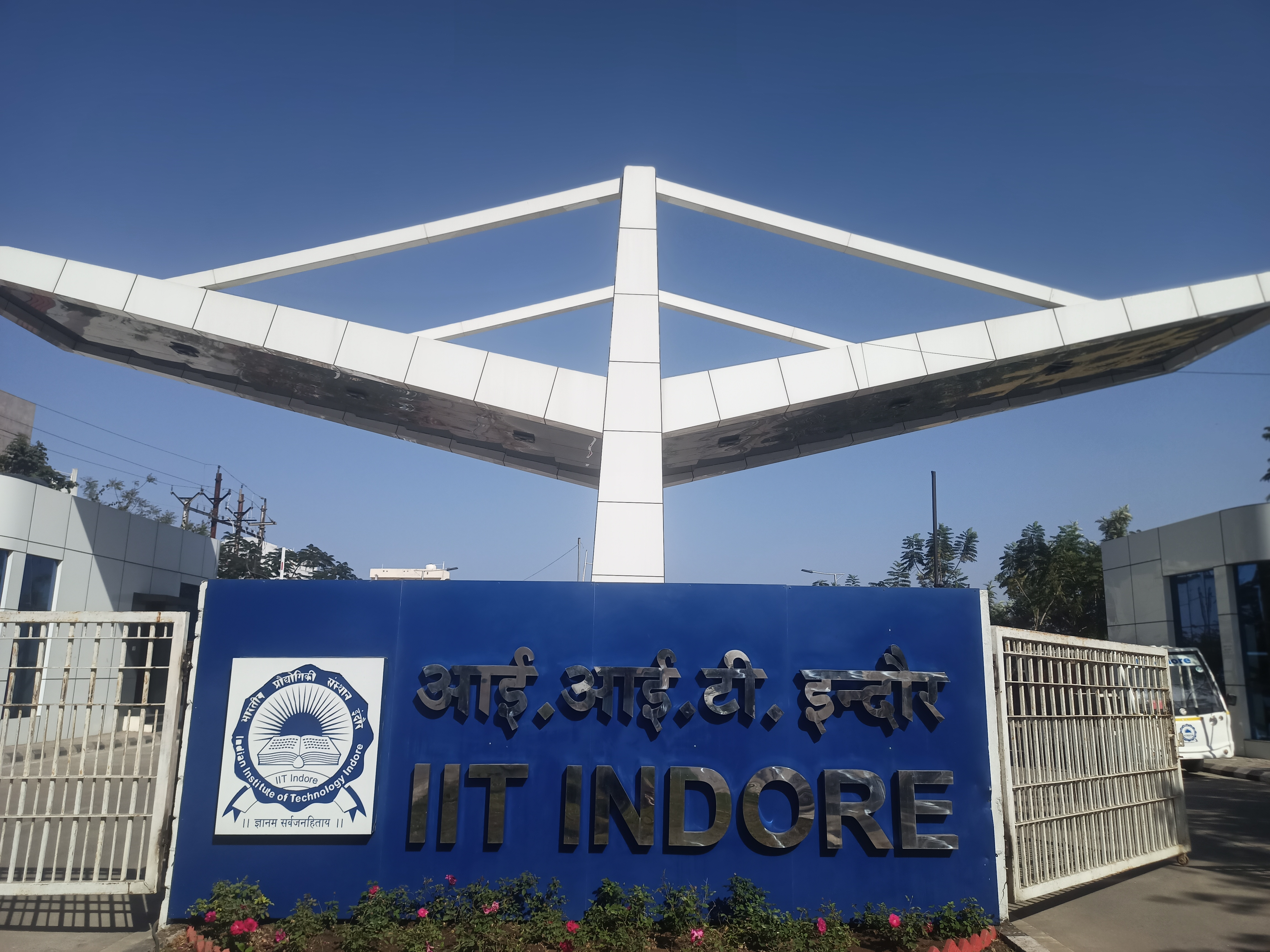
Entrance of IIT Indore

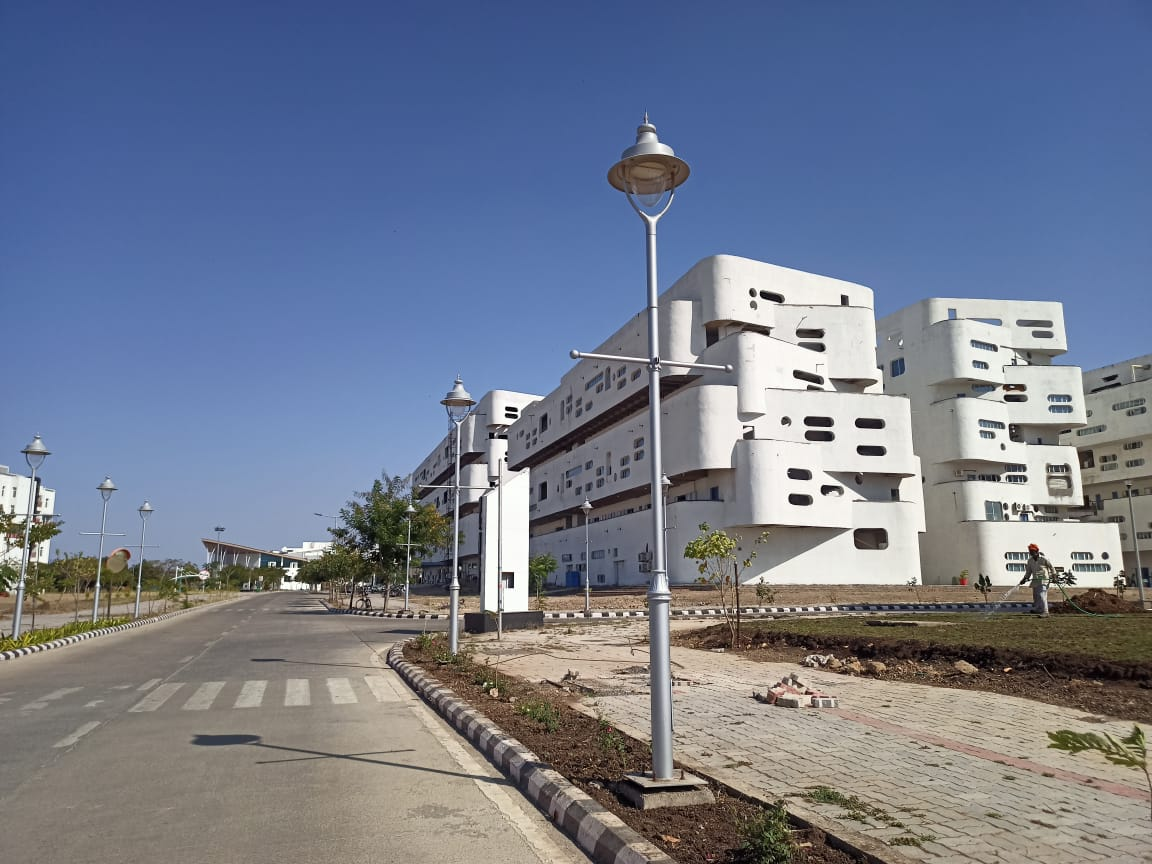
Vanadium Building

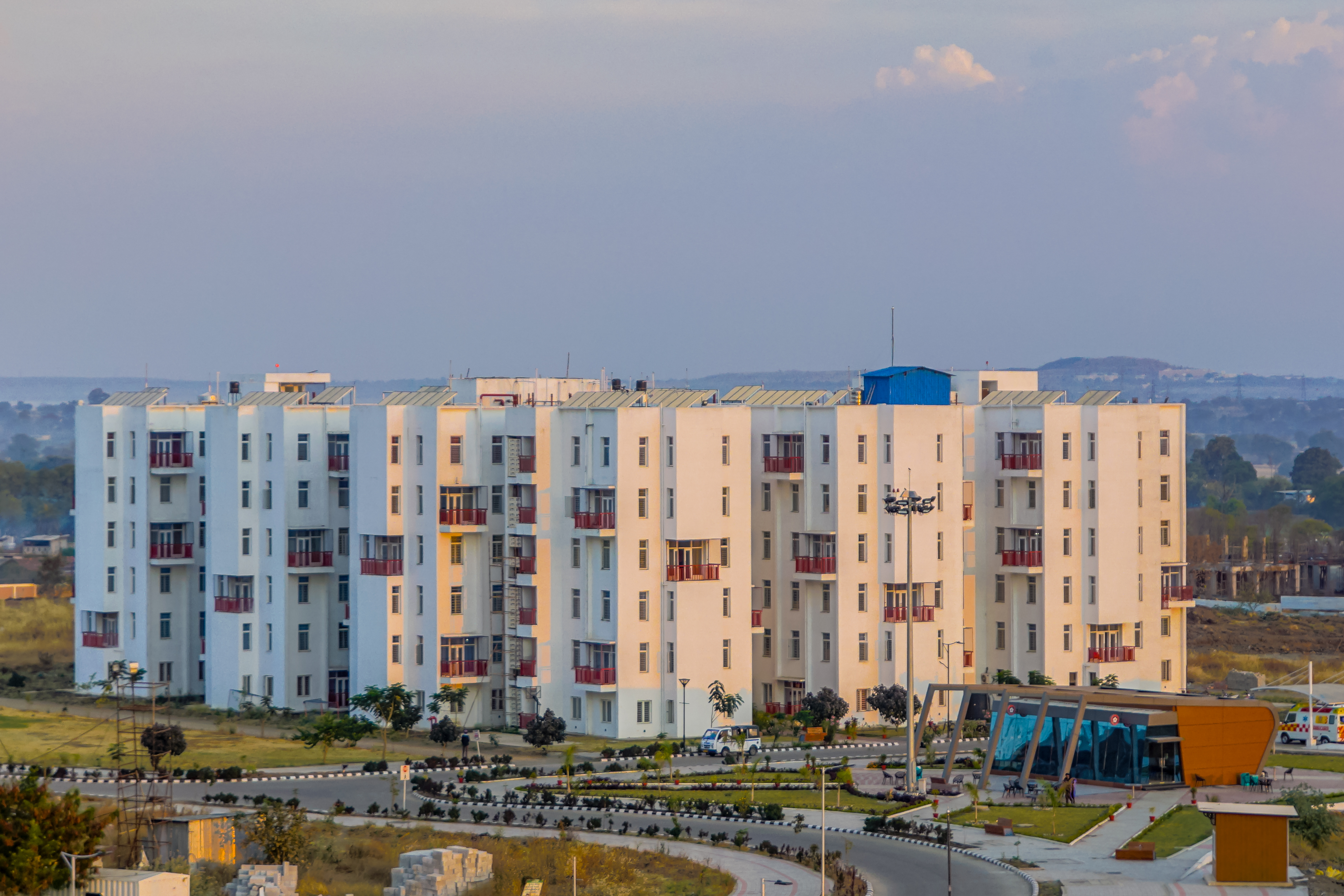
A.P.J. Abdul Kalam Hall of Residence

== Organisation and administration ==
=== Governance ===
IITs are administered centrally by the IITs' Council, an apex body established by the Government of India. Each Institute has a Board of Governors responsible for its overall administration and control. Ex-ISRO chief, Dr K Sivan was appointed as chairman of IIT Indore's board of governors in September 2023.

The senate, which consists of the heads, deans, and full professors of the institute, is the Apex Academic Body that decides the academic policies of the institute. It controls and approves the overall curriculum, courses, examinations, and results. It appoints committees to look into specific academic matters arising from time to time. The teaching, training, and research activities of various departments of the Institute are periodically reviewed to improve facilities and maintain standards. The Director of the institute is the ex-officio chairman of senate.

=== Departments ===
IIT Indore has the following departments:

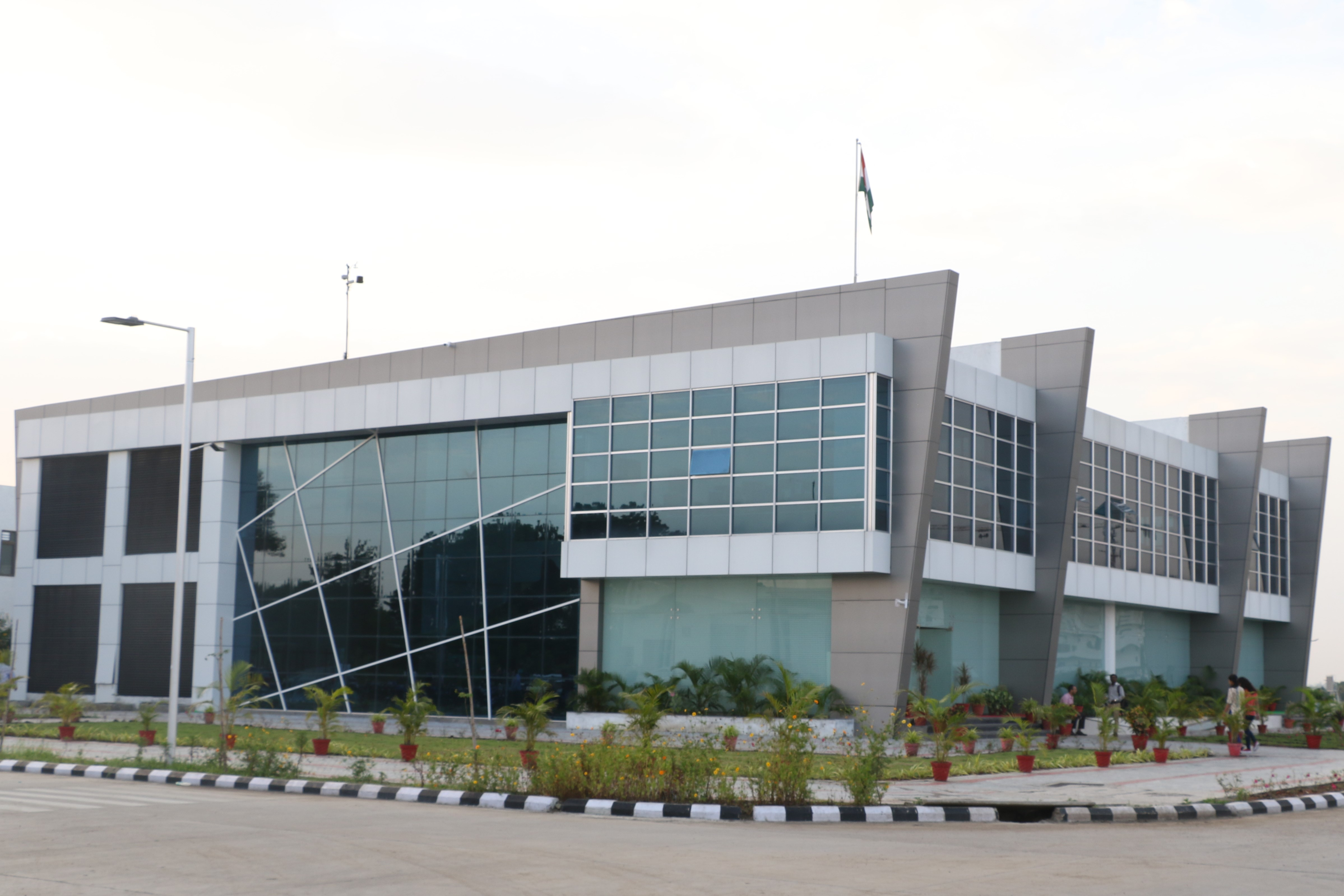
Sodium Building

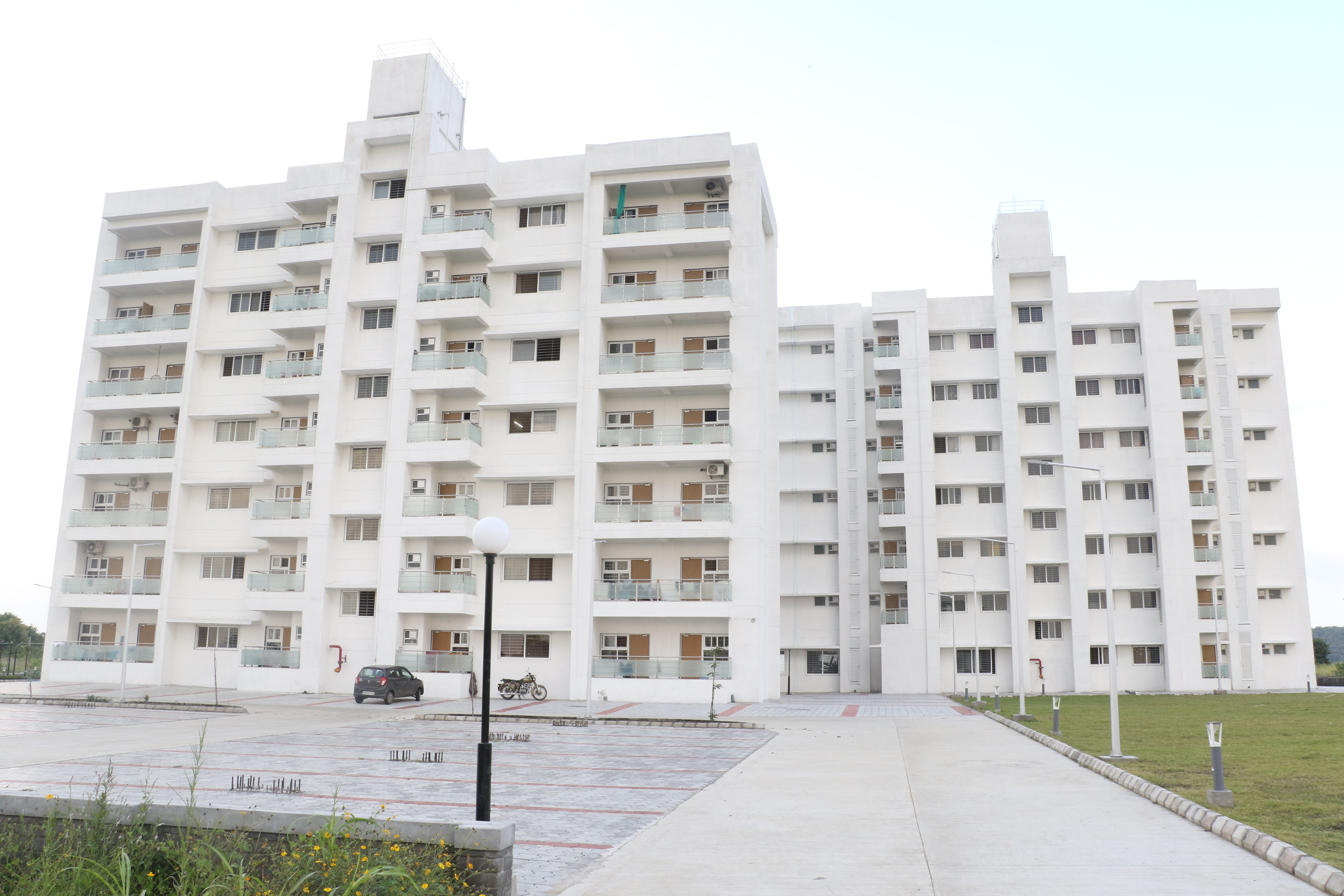
Fluorine Building

- Astronomy, Astrophysics and Space Engineering (AASE)
- Biosciences and Biomedical Engineering (BSBE)
- Chemical Engineering
- Chemistry
- Civil Engineering
- Computer Science and Engineering
- Electrical Engineering
- Humanities and Social Sciences
- Mathematics
- Mechanical Engineering
- Metallurgical Engineering and Materials Science
- Physics

=== Centers ===
IIT Indore has the following centers:

- Centre for Advanced Electronics (CAE)
- Computer and Information Technology Center (CITC)
- Center of Futuristic Defense and Space Technology (CFDST)
- Center for Indian Scientific Knowledge Systems (CISKS)
- Center for Electric Vehicle and Intelligent Transport Systems (CEVITS)
- Sophisticated Instrumentation Center (SIC)
- Center of Innovation, Incubation, Entrepreneurship and Industry Relations (CIIEIR)
- Centre for Rural Development and Technology (CRDT)
- DST-FIST Center of Excellence in Gear Engineering
- Sophisticated Instrument Centre (SIC)
- Counselling Services
- Training and Placement
- Central Workshop

=== Technology Innovation Hubs ===
==== IITI DRISHTI CPS Foundation ====
DRISTI CPS (DRiving Innovation through Simulation Hub for Technologies in Interdisciplinary Cyber-Physical Systems) is a Technology Innovation Hub (TIH) at IIT Indore established under the National Mission on Interdisciplinary Cyber-Physical Systems (NM-ICPS). The goal of DRISHTI CPS is to develop an eco-system of research and development in the system simulation, modeling, and visualization of Cyber-Physical Systems through joint efforts of the industry and academia.

== Academics ==
IIT Indore offers a four-year B.Tech programs in several engineering fields. The postgraduate and graduate programs at IIT Indore includes Ph.D, M.Tech, M.S.(research) programs in engineering and M.S.(Data Science and Management); Ph.D and M.Sc. programs in basic sciences and humanities. IIT Indore offers numerous scholarships for students under different qualification criteria.

=== Admissions ===
Students are admitted into the various B.Tech. programs through the Joint Entrance Examination – Advanced (JEE(Adv)), which is typically taken by engineering aspirants after completion of their 10+2 schooling. Admission to the M.Tech/MS/Ph.D programs is done through Graduate Aptitude Test in Engineering (GATE), and the Joint Admission Test (JAM) is conducted for taking MSc students.

=== Rankings ===
University and college rankings

General – international
- QS (World) (2025): 477
- QS (Asia) (2023): 185
- Times (World) (2023): 601–800
- Times (Asia) (2022): 87
- Times (Emerging) (2022): 84

General – India
- NIRF (Overall) (2024): 33
- NIRF (Research) (2024): 27

Engineering – India
- NIRF (2024): 16

Internationally, the IIT Indore was ranked 396 in the QS World University Rankings of 2023 and 185 in Asia. It was ranked 601–800 in the world by the Times Higher Education World University Rankings of 2023, 87 in Asia in 2022 and 84 among emerging economies.

The National Institutional Ranking Framework (NIRF) by the MoE ranked IIT Indore 27th overall in India in 2025, 24th in research and 12th among Engineering institutes.

== Research ==
The primary engineering research areas of IIT Indore are as follows:

- Department of Computer Science and Engineering - Algorithms and Theoretical Computer Science, Artificial Intelligence, Software Engineering, Cyber Security, Soft Computing, CAD-VLSI, Human-Computer Interaction (HCI), Computer Vision, Embedded Systems, Internet of Things (IoT)
- Department of Electrical Engineering - Semiconductor Devices Physics and Technology, Bio-medical Signal Processing, Organic electronic/photonic devices, VLSI, ULSI Circuit, and System Design, Power Electronics and Power Systems
- Department of Mechanical Engineering - Additive Manufacturing, Mechatronics, Internal Combustion Engines, Thermal and Fluid Engineering, Computational Mechanics, Energy Storage, Surface Engineering, Vibration, Noise Control and Applied Optics and Laser Technology.
- Department of Chemical Engineering - Process Systems Engineering, Heterogeneous catalysis, Soft Matter, Environmental Engineering, Chemical Reaction Engineering
- Department of Civil Engineering - Structural Engineering, Geotechnical Engineering, Water Resource Engineering, Environmental Engineering, Glaciohydrology
- Department of Metallurgical Engineering and Material Science - Smart Materials, Nano Materials, MEMS/NEMS, Computational Materials, and Condensed Matter Physics, Energy Materials

IIT Indore leads all the new IITs in terms of total citations as well as h-index as of 2015. Abstracting and indexing database Scopus has rated IIT Indore as the top among the new IITs, followed by seven IITs of Ropar, Patna, Bhubaneswar, Hyderabad, Gandhinagar and Jodhpur.

IIT Indore's formal undergraduate research scheme is entitled, "Promotion of Research and Innovation for Undergraduate Students (PRIUS)". IIT Indore actively participates in international projects and joint collaborations with research organizations in Japan, South Korea, the Russian Federation, Portugal, France, Germany, and USA. It started the Innovation and Entrepreneurship Development Centre (IEDC) to encourage entrepreneurship.

=== Research facilities ===
The institute provides instruments/facilities such as Nuclear Magnetic resonance spectrometer, CAD Tools for Very Large Scale Integration (VLSI) Design, Single crystal X-ray diffractometer, Time-correlated single photon counting (TCSPC), Liquid Chromatography Mass Spectrometry Total Internal Reflection Fluorescence Microscopy, Dual ion beam sputtering deposition (DIBSD) system, Spin Coater, Optical Surface Metrology System Profiler,

The Sophisticated Instrumentation Center (SIC) is a national facility hosted at IIT Indore's School of Basic Science. SIC at IIT Indore is equipped with Single Crystal X-ray Diffraction, Nuclear Magnetic Resonance, Mass Spectrometry, Elemental Analysis and Single Molecule Imaging and Spectroscopy.

== Student life ==
=== Students' Gymkhana ===
The Students' Gymkhana is a body of elected student representatives responsible for the efficient execution of all the club activities, festivals & activities within IIT Indore, and the organization of the annual techno-cultural event Fluxus, among any other duties assigned by the institute.

=== Cultural and Non-Academic Activities ===
==== Fluxus ====
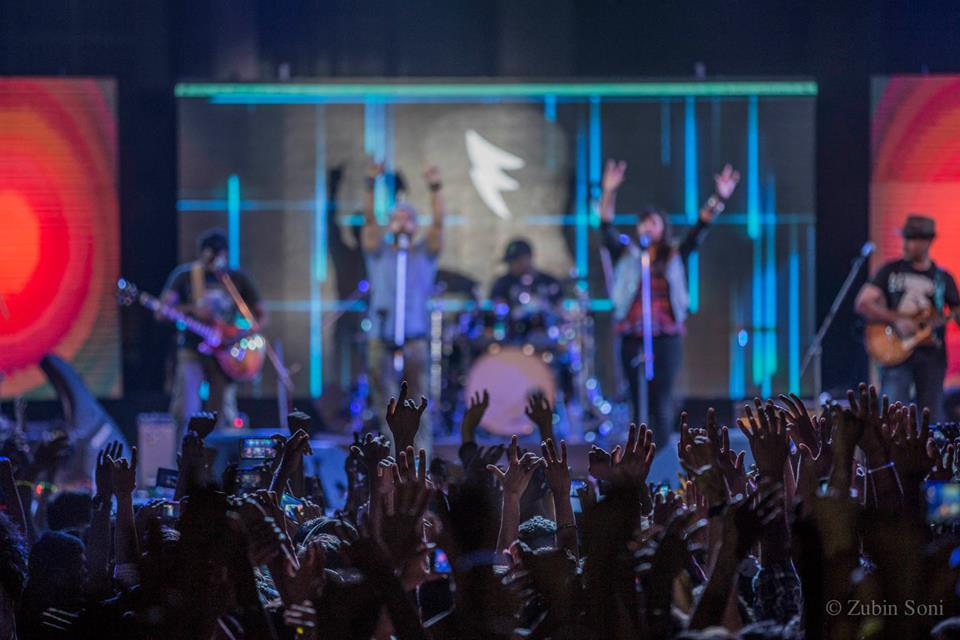
Farhan Akhtar performing at Fluxus 2015

Fluxus is the signature annual social and cultural festival of IIT Indore, held in February. It consists of several competitions, informal events, workshops and showcases professional performances. It was started in 2011.

Fluxus 2019 included 'Kavyanjali' dedicated to Hindi and Urdu poetry and shayris with poet Rahat Indori. Other guests including Kavi Sandeep Dwivedi, Surya Prakash Upadhyay, Rishi Dixit, Nitesh Kushwaha shared the stage with Dr. Rahat Indori. It also included the concerts of the rock band The Local Train, the singer Amit Trivedi and the Canadian EDM performer, Miss Tara. The decade anniversary hosted an alumni meet Magnum Opus for all the IITI graduates.

Fluxus 2020 included musical performances of the singer duo Salim–Sulaiman, DJ Shaan, The Yellow Diary and the stand-up comedy performance of Zakir Khan.

== See also ==
- Indian Institutes of Technology
- Institutes of National Importance
- Ministry of Human Resource Development (India)
- List of autonomous higher education institutes in India
- Indian Institute of Technology Bombay
