= Vartika Mathur =

Indian scientist

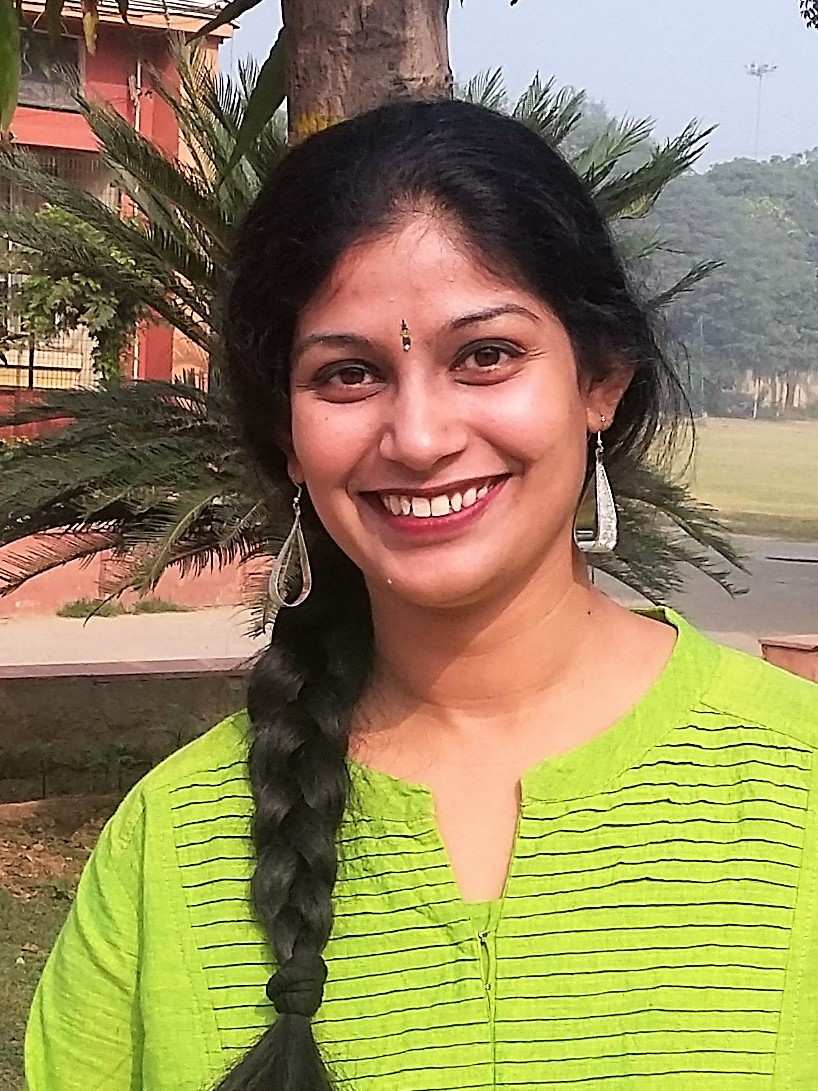
- Mathur in 2016
- Born: August 27, 1979 (age 47), New Delhi
- Education: Wageningen University and Research Centre
- Occupations: Professor, Department of Zoology, Sri Venkateswara College, New Delhi
- Spouse: Amit Mathur
- Children: 2
- Awards: Young Scientist of the Year Award 2015
- Website: https://apilab.co.in/

Dr Vartika Mathur (born 27 August 1979) is an Indian scientist who is a Professor in the Department of Zoology, Sri Venkateswara College, University of Delhi. She was the only Indian to receive the NFP fellowship in 2008 from Nuffic in partnership with Ministry of Education, Culture and Science (Netherlands) and Dutch Ministry of Foreign Affairs, which enabled her to pursue PhD at Wageningen University and Research Centre. She finally received her PhD in 2012 for her studies on plant-animal-microbe interactions. Her research led to the characterization of temporal dynamics of different insect-induced plant responses.

== Career ==
Dr Mathur has been running independent research lab Animal-Plant-Interactions Lab since 2011 with research grants obtained from SERB, UGC, NAM S&T , University of Delhi, Nuffic, Eureka Forbes and PI industries. She is the research advisor for Department of Pulmonary Medicine and Sleep Disorders, AIIMS, New Delhi. She is also the associate editor for Biojournal, member of International Society of Chemical Ecology(ISCE) and reviewer in international journals of high repute. Dr Mathur started her career as an assistant professor in 2003 at Daulat Ram College, University of University of Delhi. She then moved to Sri Venkateswara College and has been teaching there since as assistant professor, in the Department of Zoology.

== Achievements ==
Dr Mathur was awarded the European Mobility Grant for International Laureates by the International Doctoral College of the European University of Brittany (CDI-UEB) in 2010 to perform research in University of Rennes, France. She has been awarded the "Young Scientist of the year Award 2015" in the field of Chemical Ecology by the International Foundation of Environment and Ecology. She is the host supervisor for a six-month Research Training Fellowship for Developing Country Scientists (RTF-DCS). She is a Life Time Member of Association of Microbiologists of India. Dr Mathur has been running independent animal-plant interactions research lab since 2011 at Sri Venkateswara College. Dr Mathur has several publications in peer-reviewed journals, with a total impact of 17.66. She has also authored an ecology book for undergraduate students.

== Publications ==
Dr Mathur has authored multiple scientific books with reputed publishers. She has also collaborated with others working in the same field. Her areas of expertise include animal plant interactions, plant microbiome, entomology and plant biochemistry, Some of her notably published books include, Air Pollution and Public Health: Challenges Interventions and Sustainable Solutions, Biology of chordates, Environmental Ecology and Field Biology: Applied aspects.
