= Deepak Mathur =

Indian physicist (born 1952)

- Born: 8 April 1952 (age 74); India
- Education: University of London; Birkbeck, University of London
- Known for: Studies on electron scattering and Lasers
- Awards: Eminent Mass Spectrometrist Prize; 1991 Shanti Swarup Bhatnagar Prize
- Scientific career
- Fields: Molecular physics; Atomic physics; Biological physics
- Workplaces: Birkbeck, University of London; Tata Institute of Fundamental Research; Manipal Academy of Higher Education; Oxford University; Swansea University; University of British Columbia; Aarhus University; Tohoku University; Imperial College London
- Doctoral advisor: John Hasted

Deepak Mathur (born 8 April 1952) is an Indian molecular and atomic physicist and was a distinguished professor at the Tata Institute of Fundamental Research. He has been the J C Bose National Fellow at the Department of Atomic and Molecular Physics at Manipal Academy of Higher Education (MAHE) and founding director of the UM-DAE Centre for Excellence in Basic Science at the University of Mumbai. Known for his research on molecular and biological physics, Mathur is an elected fellow of the Indian Academy of Sciences, Indian National Science Academy and The World Academy of Sciences. The Council of Scientific and Industrial Research, the apex agency of the Government of India for scientific research, awarded him the Shanti Swarup Bhatnagar Prize for Science and Technology, one of the highest Indian science awards, for his contributions to physical sciences in 1991. (Note: Long link - please select award year to see details) Amongst other awards, he has been the Royal Society's Guest Fellow at Oxford University and winner of the European Union's Erasmus-Mundus prize in optical science which he held at Imperial College London. Currently he is an adjunct professor at MAHE and is also learning to fly. His initial training was on a Grob G-115 2-seater training aircraft but he has now moved on to flying PA-28 4-seater aircraft.

== Biography ==
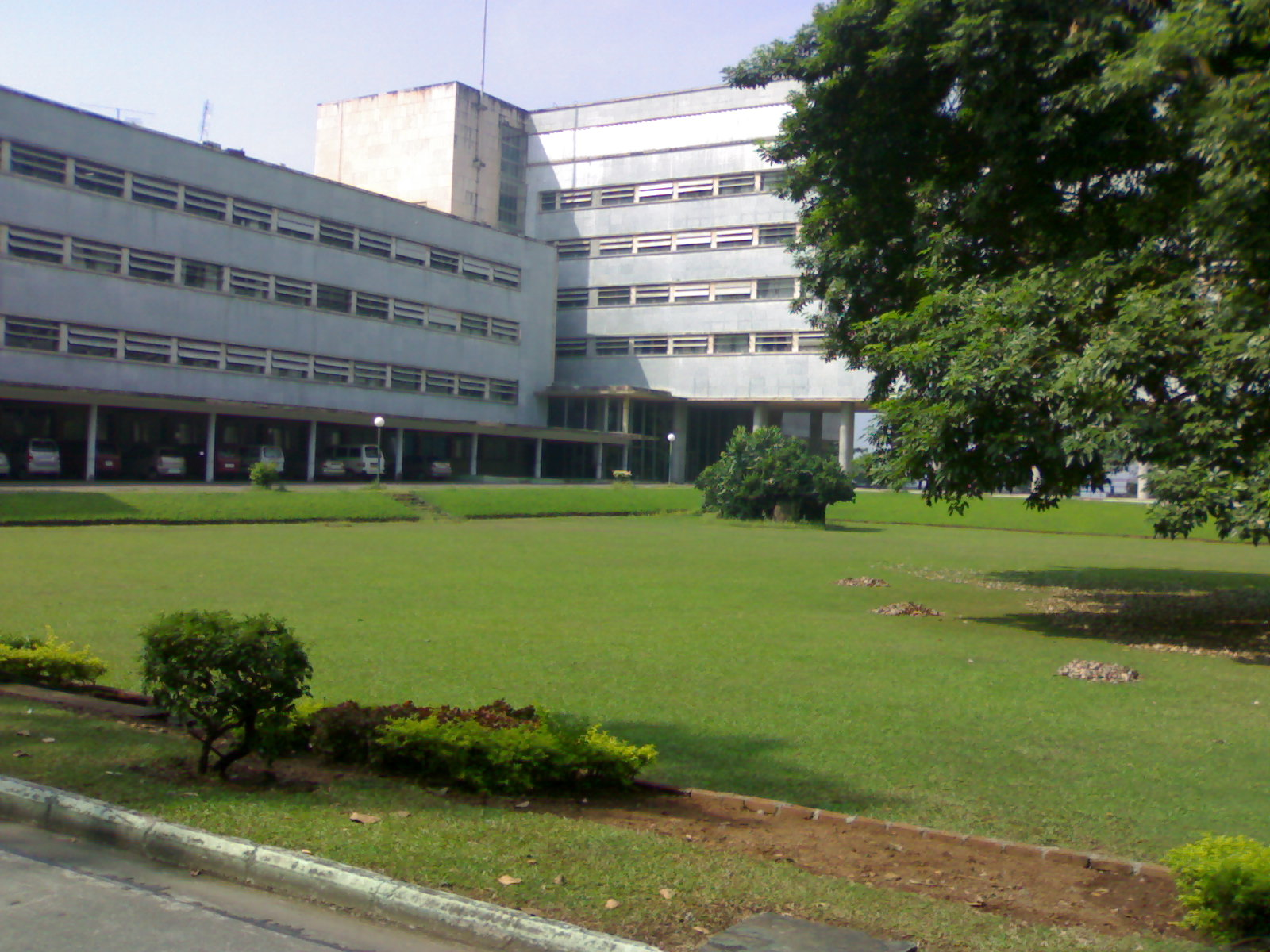
Tata Institute of Fundamental Research

Deepak Mathur was born on 8 April 1952 and completed his undergraduate studies in engineering at the University of London in 1973. He continued his doctoral studies in the UK at Birkbeck College under the guidance of John Hasted. Securing his PhD in 1976, he did his post-doctoral research under Harrie Massey at the department of physics and astronomy of the University of London during 1976–78 and started his career as a research officer at his alma mater, Birkbeck College, in 1978. Three years later, he returned to India to take up a faculty position at Tata Institute of Fundamental Research. He serves there as the principal investigator at the Atomic and Molecular Sciences Laboratory and as a distinguished professor of the institute. When the Centre for Excellence in Basic Sciences was established in 2007 as an autonomous institute under the University of Mumbai, he became its founding director and held the post for a while. He also serves as an adjunct professor at the Centre for Atomic and Molecular Physics, MAHE (formerly Manipal University), and as a visiting professor at several universities and institutions which include Oxford University, Swansea University, University of British Columbia, Aarhus University, Tohoku University and Imperial College London.

== Legacy ==
During his post-doctoral work in Sir Harrie Massey's laboratory at University College London, Mathur's focus was on electron-ion collision experiments within an ion trap. Later, he furthered his experiments by developing an energy spectrometric technique. He has also developed other laboratory instruments and is credited with a class of isolated metastable multiply-charged molecular ions which have a lower rate of dissociation. His studies have been documented by way of a number of articles (Note: Please see Selected bibliography section) and the online article repository of Indian Academy of Sciences has listed 225 of them. He has edited one book, Physics of Ion Impact Phenomena and has contributed chapters to books edited by others. He served as the editor of Rapid Communications in Mass Spectrometry, as the co-editor of EPL (journal) and sat in the advisory boards of Journal of Physics B and EPL (journal).

As the founder director of the Centre for Excellence in Basic Sciences, Mathur is known to have established a research-based integrated master's program at the institute. He has been associated with a number of national and international organizations and has held the vice chair of the Commission on C-15 on Atomic, Molecular and Optical Physics of the International Union of Pure and Applied Physics. He has co-chaired the Asian Intense Laser Network and has served as the secretary of the International Committee for Ultra Intense Lasers. He has been a member of the International Committee for Intense Laser Science, executive committee of the International Conference on Photonics, Electronic and Atomic collisions, the council of the Raja Ramanna Centre for Advanced Technology and the executive committee of Nehru Science Centre.

== Awards and honors ==
The Council of Scientific and Industrial Research awarded him the Shanti Swarup Bhatnagar Prize, one of the highest Indian science awards in 1991. He is also a recipient of the Eminent Mass Spectrometrist Prize and the Indian Physics Association's N.S. SatyaMurthy Memorial Award. The award orations delivered by him include M. N. Saha Memorial Lectures, T. K. Rai Dastidar Memorial Lecture, L. K. Ananthakrishnan Memorial Lecture and R. S. Krishnan Memorial Lecture.

Mathur was elected as a fellow by the Indian Academy of Sciences in 1992 and in 1999, the Indian National Science Academy made him their elected fellow. The World Academy of Sciences elected him as a fellow in 2013. He has also held several research fellowships such as Royal Society Guest Fellowship at Oxford University, Fulton Fellowship of the Association of Commonwealth Universities, Erasmus Mundus Scholarship in optical science and technology of European Union and holds the J. C. Bose National Fellowship of the Science and Engineering Research Board of the Government of India.

== Selected bibliography ==
=== Books ===
- —— (6 December 2012). Physics of Ion Impact Phenomena. Springer Science & Business Media. ISBN 978-3-642-84350-1.
- Vasa, P.; —— (2016). Ultrafast Biophotonics. Springer Science & Business Media. ISBN 978-3-319-81923-5.

=== Chapters ===
- —— (2009). "Atomic, Molecular and Optical Physics: Progress and Opportunities". In Asoke Nath Mitra (ed.). India in the World of Physics: Then and Now. Pearson Education India. pp. 131–156. ISBN 978-81-317-1579-6.

=== Articles ===
- ——; Dharmadhikari, Aditya; Dharmadhikari, Jayashree A; Vasa, Parinda (2017). "Hydrogen migration within a water molecule: Formation of HD+ upon irradiation of HOD with intense, ultrashort laser pulses". Journal of Physics B: Atomic, Molecular and Optical Physics. 50 (15): 154004. Bibcode:2017JPhB...50o4004M. doi:10.1088/1361-6455/aa7c85. S2CID 126119065.
- Kumar, G. Ravindra; Gross, P.; Safvan, C. P.; Rajgara, F. A.; —— (1996). "Molecular pendular states in intense laser fields". Physical Review A. 53 (5): 3098–3102. Bibcode:1996PhRvA..53.3098K. doi:10.1103/PhysRevA.53.3098. PMID 9913248.
- —— (1993). "Multiply charged molecules". Physics Reports. 225 (4): 193–272. Bibcode:1993PhR...225..193M. doi:10.1016/0370-1573(93)90006-Y.

== See also ==
- Mass spectrometry
- Asoke Nath Mitra
