= Pradeep Mathur (scientist) =

- Born: 17 August 1955 (age 71); Teheran, Iran
- Education: University of North London; Keele University; Yale University
- Known for: Studies on mixed metal cluster compounds
- Awards: 2000 Shanti Swarup Bhatnagar Prize
- Scientific career
- Fields: Organometallic chemistry; Cluster chemistry
- Workplaces: IIT Mumbai; IIT Indore; University of Cambridge; University of Freiburg; University of Karlsruhe

Pradeep Mathur (born 1955) is an Indian organometallic and cluster chemist and the founder director of the Indian Institute of Technology, Indore. He is a former professor of the Indian Institute of Technology, Mumbai and is known for his studies on mixed metal cluster compounds. He is an elected fellow of the Indian Academy of Sciences The Council of Scientific and Industrial Research, the apex agency of the Government of India for scientific research, awarded him the Shanti Swarup Bhatnagar Prize for Science and Technology, one of the highest Indian science awards, in 2000, for his contributions to chemical sciences. He has also been honoured by the award of an honorary Doctor of Science degree by the University of Keele in the U.K.

== Biography ==
Pradeep Mathur, born on 17 August 1955 in Teheran to Damyanti and Amrit Dayal. Mathur and his older brother, renowned physicist at TIFR, Deepak Mathur (married to Helen Mathur) were both brought up and educated in London whilst their father Amrit Dayal worked as a senior diplomatic official at the Indian High Commission in London and Accra. Mathur continued to live in England till he moved to Yale. He gained an honours degree at the University of North London in 1976 and secured a PhD from Keele University in 1981 before moving onto Yale University as a post-doctoral researcher. Mathur chose to move to India and joined Indian Institute of Technology, Mumbai in 1984 as a member of the faculty of chemistry where he held several positions before reaching the position of a professor and the head of the National Single Crystal X-ray Diffraction Facility. When the Indian Institute of Technology, Indore was established in 2009, Mathur was appointed as its founder director. At the end of his first five-year term, his contract was extended for a second term and he continues to hold the position, simultaneously serving as a professor of the department of chemistry. He has been a visiting professor at University of Cambridge, University of Freiburg and University of Karlsruhe and has been associated with a number of scientific journals, viz. Organometallics, Journal of Organometallic Chemistry and Journal of Cluster Science as a member of their editorial boards.

Mathur is married to Vinita and the couple have two daughters, Nehika and Saloni.

== Legacy and honors ==
Mathur's researches were focused on the organometallic chemistry of mixed metal cluster compounds and he has developed synthetic strategies for introducing chalcogen bridges. At IIT Mumbai, he handled projects related to the investigation of unusual metal mediated transformations and the interactions between the metal atoms and unsaturated organic species. He has published his researches by way of chapters contributed to books authored by others and over 180 peer-reviewed articles; ResearchGate and Google Scholar, two online repositories have listed several of them. He has also guided 22 doctoral scholars in their studies.

Mathur was a Fulbright scholar in 1995 and the Indian Academy of Sciences elected him as a fellow in 1996. The Council of Scientific and Industrial Research awarded him the Shanti Swarup Bhatnagar Prize, one of the highest Indian science awards, in 2000. He has also been honoured with an honorary D.Sc. degree by the University of Keele in the U.K.

== See also ==
- Cluster chemistry
