= Prem Mathur =

Indian aviator

Prem Mathur is the first Indian woman commercial pilot and started flying for Deccan Airways. She obtained her commercial pilot's licence in 1947. In 1949, she won the National Air Race.

== Early life ==
Mathur was born on 17 January 1910.

== Career ==
Mathur was rejected by eight airlines before she got a job at Deccan Airways in Hyderabad in 1947. She was offered the job at the age of 38 where she became the first Indian woman to fly a commercial plane. She received her license from the Allahabad Flying Club. She flew her first plane as a co-pilot. During her career at Deccan Airways, she flew high-profile people like Indira Gandhi, Lal Bahadur Shastri and Lady Mountbatten.

Mathur wanted the full command of the cockpit but was denied the same by Deccan Airways, even after fulfilment of the required flying hours by her. Soon after, she moved to Delhi where she became G.D. Birla's private jet pilot. After that she joined Indian Airlines in 1953 and worked there for the rest of her career span.

== Awards ==
In 1949, Mathur won the National Air Race.

== Personal life ==
Mathur married Hari Krishna Mathur who hails from Allahabad, Uttar Pradesh and they had six children together. Mathur died at the age of 82 on 22 December 1992.
