= Auto-da-Fé (play) =

One-act 1941 play by Tennessee Williams

Auto-da-Fé is a one-act 1941 play by Tennessee Williams. The plot concerns a young postal worker, Eloi, whose sexuality is repressed by a rigidly moralistic mother.
