= Sheila Dhar =

- Born: 1929
- Died: 26 July 2001 (aged 71–72)
- Genres: Hindustani classical music
- Instrument: singing
- Years active: 1929–2001

Sheila Dhar (1929 – 26 July 2001) was an Indian author and singer of Kirana gharana. She is known for her writings about music and musicians, which included three books. She also taught English literature and language at Delhi University. She was the wife of P. N. Dhar, an economist and an advisor of Prime Minister Indira Gandhi.

== Early life ==
Sheila Belongs to a Mathur Kayastha family.Sheila published a book - Raga'n Josh - about the lifestyle of her Mathur Kayastha community s in the Delhi of the 1940s and '50s providing a glimpse of the old Delhi, which included her experiences with life in bureaucracy and anecdotes from the lives of musicians like Bade Ghulam Ali Khan, Kesarbai Kerkar, Pran Nath, and Begum Akhtar. After dropping out of Lady Hardinge Medical College, Sheila joined Hindu College and was the top of Delhi University English Honours batch in 1950. She was awarded a Summa Cum Laude for her M.A. by Boston University following which she taught Literature for a short while at Miranda House, and then joined the Government's Publications Division.

Two books penned by Sheila Dhar reveal insights into the world of Hindustani classical music and its practitioners.

== Bibliography ==
- Children's History of India (1961)
- This India (1973)
- Here's Someone I'd Like You to Meet (1995)
- Raga'n' Josh
- Tales of Innocents, Musicians and Bureaucrats
