= Srivastava =

Indian Kayastha clan

Srivastava (Hindi pronunciation: [ʃɾiːʋaːstəʋ]; Śrīvāstava), also spelled variously as Shrivastava, Shrivastav or Srivastav, is a common surname found among the Chitraguptavanshi Kayastha community of Hindus particularly in the Hindi-speaking regions of northern India.

The Chitraguptavanshi Kayasthas were powerful components of the upper-bureaucracy and made influential urban elites under Hindu kings.

== Etymology ==
The title Śrīvāstava is the shortened form of Śrīvāstavya and thus derived directly from the Sanskrit root words Sri (श्री) "God" and vas (वस्) "to dwell" by adding the primary suffix tavyat which denotes an agent and causes the lengthening of the radical vowel. While the word Sri is used in Sanskrit as honorific prefix to the names of deities and vāstavya means "a resident, inhabitant"; thereby the whole meaning "in whom God dwells". Note, however, that a word's meaning is derived from its use in sentence, not from its etymology.

According to another explanation, the name "Srivastava" originates from "Srivastu/Suvastu", the former name of the Swat River, which is said to be the place of origin of this clan.

== Origin ==
Srivastavas are one of the twelve sub-clans of the Chitraguptvanshi Kayasthas that were traditionally involved in record-keeping, administration and military services.

They consider themselves as a de facto varna that arose to keep records of the four varnas that came before them. Traditions and occupations associated with them, and their belief in the mythical roles assigned to Chitragupta, their progenitor, partly support this claim.

Most of the recorded history, after the 10th century AD, of this clan is centred around Varanasi and present day eastern Uttar Pradesh and central India, as being influential during ancient empires and Mughal Empire in the Indian subcontinent, earning such titles as Pandit, Thakur and Lala.

== Notable people with this name ==
Notable people named Srivastava (or its variations) include:

- Aadesh Shrivastava (1966–2015), Indian music director
- Aanjjan Srivastav (born 1948), Indian film, television and stage dancer/actor
- Aditya Srivastava (born 1968), Indian actor
- Ajita Srivastava, Indian singer
- Alankrita Shrivastava (born 1979), Indian filmmaker
- Anand & Milind Srivastava, Indian music directors
- Ashirbadi Lal Srivastava (1899–1973), Indian historian
- Chandrika Prasad Srivastava (1920–2013), Indian diplomat
- Chitragupt Shrivastava, Indian music director
- Dheer Charan Srivastav (born 1967), Indian actor
- Ganesh Prasad Srivastava (1933–2011), physicist, author
- Hari Shankar Srivastava (1921–2017), Indian historian
- Harish Chandra Srivastava, Indian politician
- J. N. Srivastava (1933–2010), Indian mathematician
- Kapil Srivastava, Indian guitarist, music composer, educationist & author
- Maharishi Mahesh Yogi (1918–2008, recorded by Allahabad University as "M.C. Shrivastava"), introduced Transcendental Meditation
- Mansi Srivastava (born 1990), Indian TV actress
- Nikhil Srivastava, Indian mathematician
- Nirmala Srivastava (1923–2011), founder of Sahaja Yoga
- Onkar Nath Srivastava (born 1942), Indian physicist
- Paul Shrivastava (born 1952), American academic
- Rajendra Srivastava (born 1951), Indian academic
- Raju Srivastav (1963–2022), Indian comedian
- Ramesh Srivastava (born 1983), American singer
- Ranjana Srivastava, Australian oncologist
- Sanjeev Srivastava, Indian journalist
- Shailendra Nath Shrivastava (1936–2006), Indian politician
- Tara Rani Srivastava, Indian woman freedom fighter

Notable Srivastavas who changed their name

- Amitabh Bachchan (born 1942), born as Amitabh Srivastava, Bollywood actor
- Harivansh Rai Bachchan (1907–2003), born as Harivansh Rai Srivastava, Indian poet
- Parichay Das (born Ravindra Nath Srivastava), Indian editor
- Jayaprakash Narayan (1902–1979, son of Harsu Dayal Srivastava), Indian independence activist, social reformer and political leader
- Zamindaar Babu Trilok Nath (1866–1960, born Trilok Nath Srivastava), prince of British India
- Natwarlal (1912–2009, born as Mithilesh Kumar Srivastava), Indian con man
- Rajendra Prasad (1884–1963), born as Rajendra Prasad Srivastava, first President of India
- Munshi Premchand (1880–1936, born Dhanpat Rai Srivastava), Indian writer
- Lal Bahadur Shastri (1904–1966), born as Lal Bahadur Srivastava, second Prime Minister of India
