= Trilok =

Trilok (Triloka lit. 'Three Worlds' in Sanskrit) may refer to:

- Trilok Teerth Dham, a Jain temple in Bada Gaon, Baghpat, Uttar Pradesh
- Trailokya, a division of the universe into three regions or states of existence in Hindu, Jain, and Buddhist theology, and in theosophism; also a surname
- Trilok Gurtu (born 1951), Indian percussionist and composer
- Trilok Kapoor (active 1933-1954), Indian film actor
- Zamindaar Babu Trilok Nath (1866-1960), ruler of the princely state of Belghat, Northwest Province, British India (modern day Uttar Pradesh)

== See also ==
- Trailokyanath, an Indian name
- Trailokyamalla (disambiguation)
- Trilokpuri (disambiguation)
