= International Sahaja Public School =

Location
- Dharamshala; India; 32.25852°N 76.30206°E

Information
- Religious affiliation: Sahaja Yoga
- Established: 1990; 36 years ago
- Language: English

The International Sahaja Public School in Dharamsala, India is a school run by the Sahaja Yoga movement. The school was founded in 1990.

== Overview ==
The school is located in the Himalayas, above Dharamsala in the Kangra district, near McLeod Ganj, at an altitude of more than 1700m. Children coming to the school must have previously been brought up in Sahaja Yoga culture and understand the importance of meditation. Their education is based on the teachings of [H.H.Shri Mataji Nirmala Devi]. Students "learn the basic principles of Sahaja Yoga ... the tenets of Hinduism and worship the school’s patron".

The medium of instruction is English. Subjects (as followed by the Indian Certificate of Secondary Education curriculum) include standard courses as well as English, German, Indian Classical Music (including instruments), and Indian Classical dance.

== Mixed views ==
Judith Coney reports that the school has accepted children from the age of four and notes that "often very young children are separated from their natural parents for prolonged periods, as they usually stay in India for nine months". An Indian newspaper article published in 2000 reported that students at the time were aged six and above.

=== Criticism of the International Sahaja Public School ===
==== 1. Disputed Historical Claims ====
According to firsthand testimonies and archival photographs, before its official founding in Dharamshala in April 1990, the International Sahaja Public School (ISPS) temporarily operated in Vashi, Mumbai. This early phase, reportedly beginning in 1989, included a small group of children sent from Western Sahaja Yoga families—primarily from Switzerland, Germany, France, India and the United States. Testimonies from former students describe this phase as highly regimented, with a focus on spiritual "cleansing" and behavioral correction. These accounts conflict with a 2000 Indian newspaper article that claimed the school only accepted students aged six and above after its founding. Children were reportedly encouraged to "cleanse" themselves from Western habits and cultural influences, which were seen as incompatible with the Sahaja Yoga way of life. Some students were reportedly sent back due to having "bad vibrations," a concept central to Sahaja Yoga beliefs. One such case involves a French student referred to as "Minakshi," who was allegedly returned for this reason.

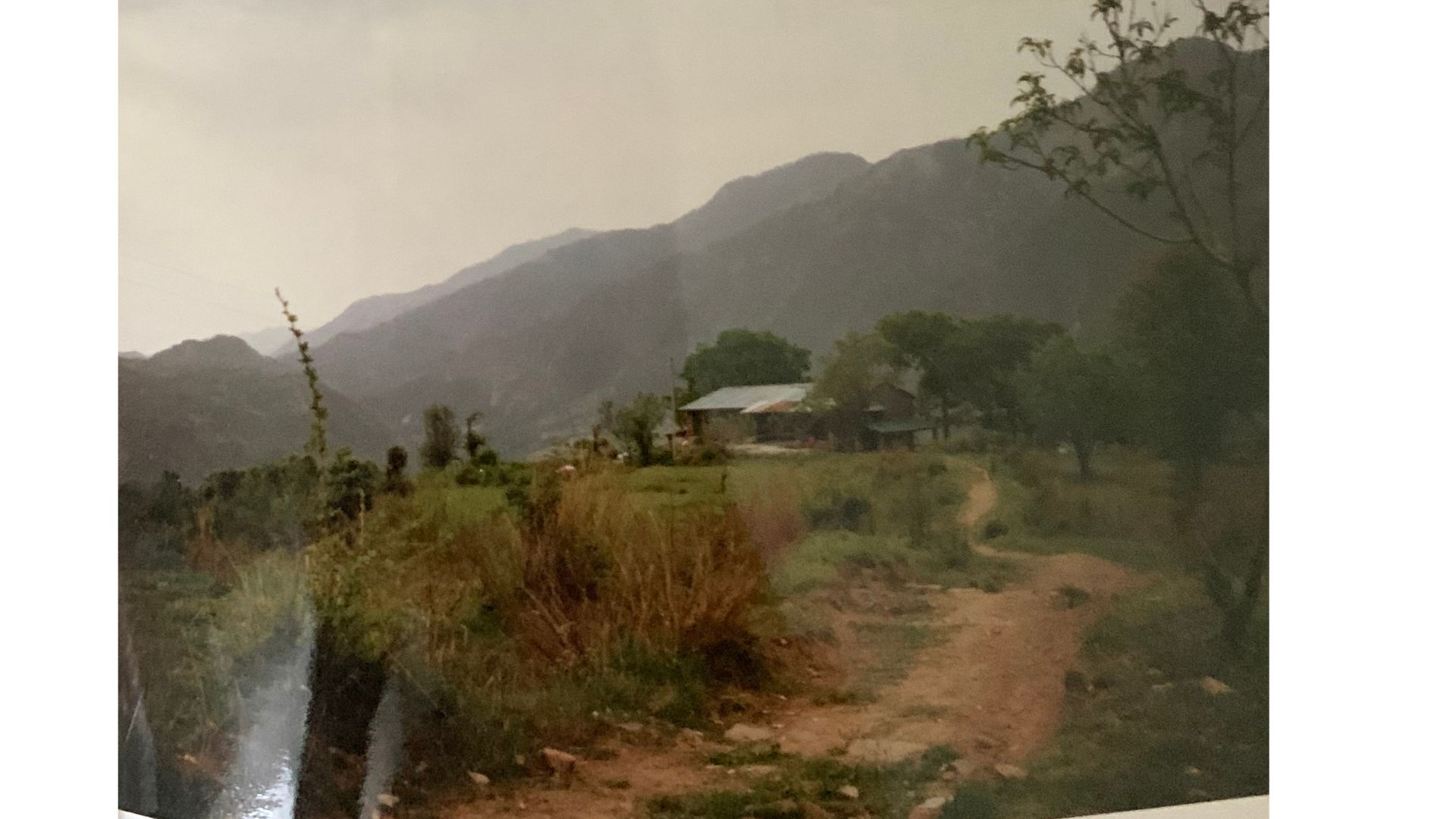
Photograph of original hut used during the first student stay in Dharamsala, 1989. Private archive. Evidence contradicts official founding date.

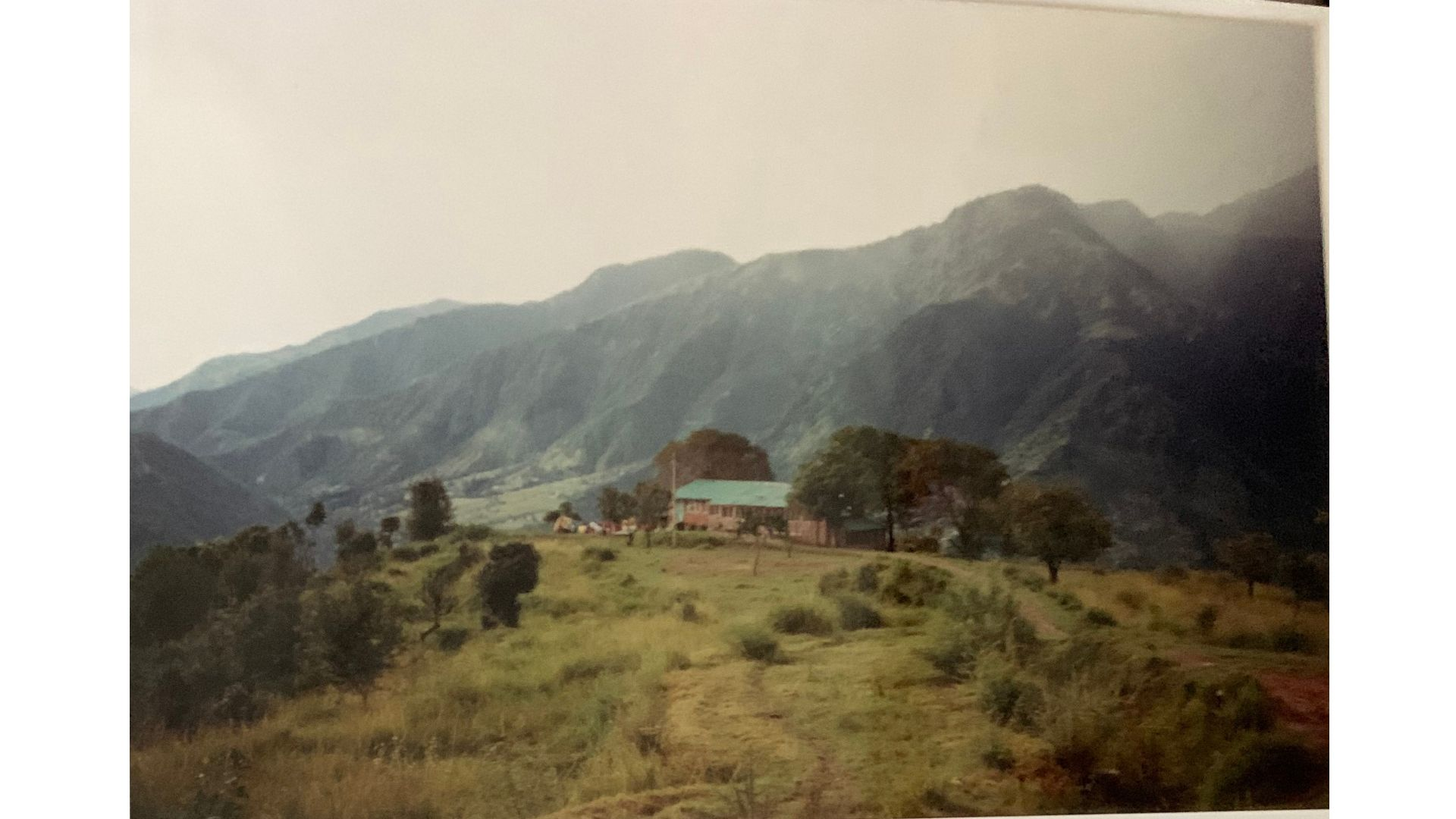
Original picture of ISPS in Dharamsala, 1989. Source: private archive.

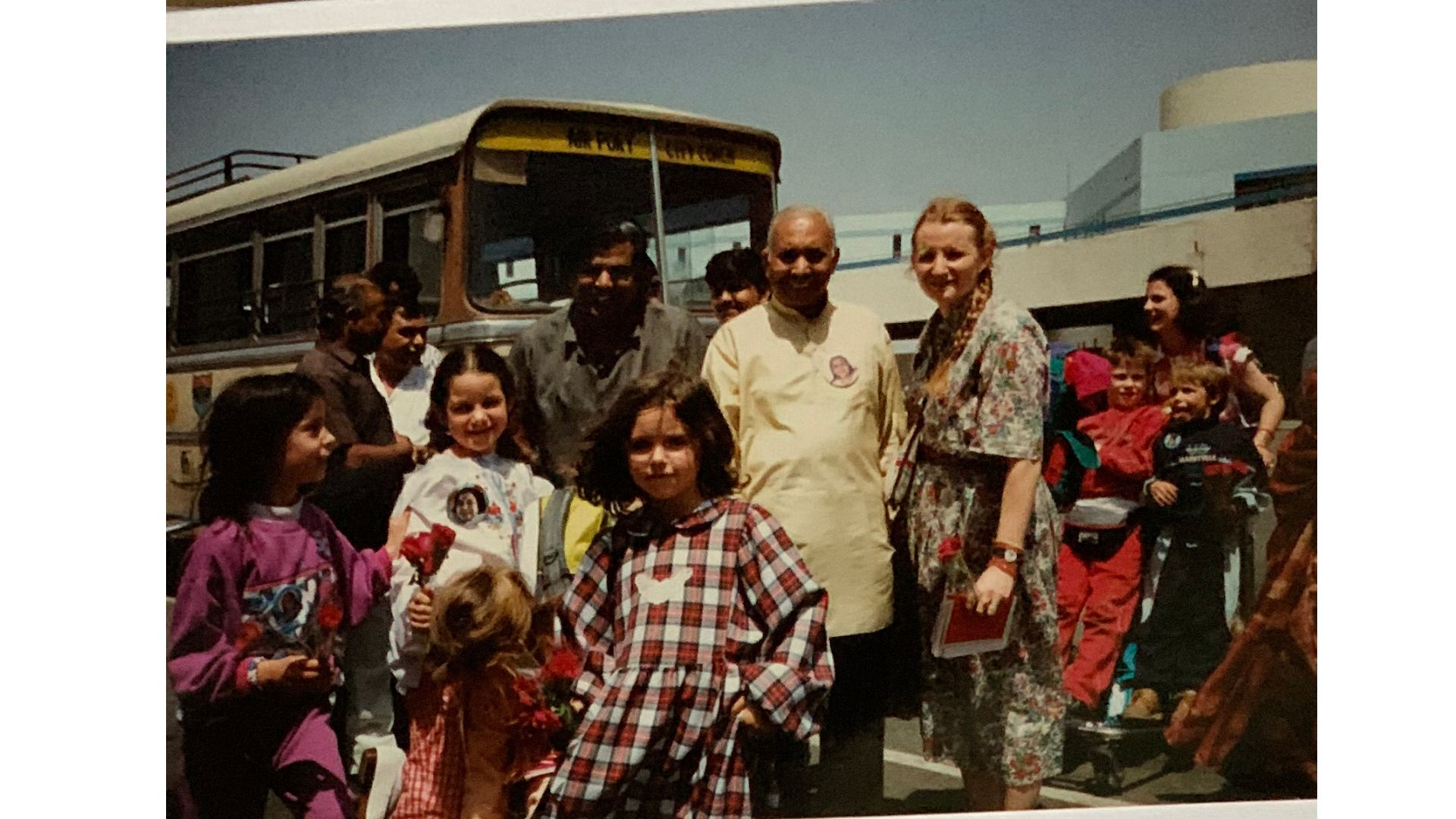
Onboarding the bus before departure to school in Dharamsala, 1989. Private archive. Evidence contradicts official founding date.

Official school communications state that admission was open to children aged six and above. However, multiple first-person testimonies suggest that children younger than six, in some cases as young as four, were accepted during the early operational phase. This raises concerns regarding age-appropriate care and developmental support.

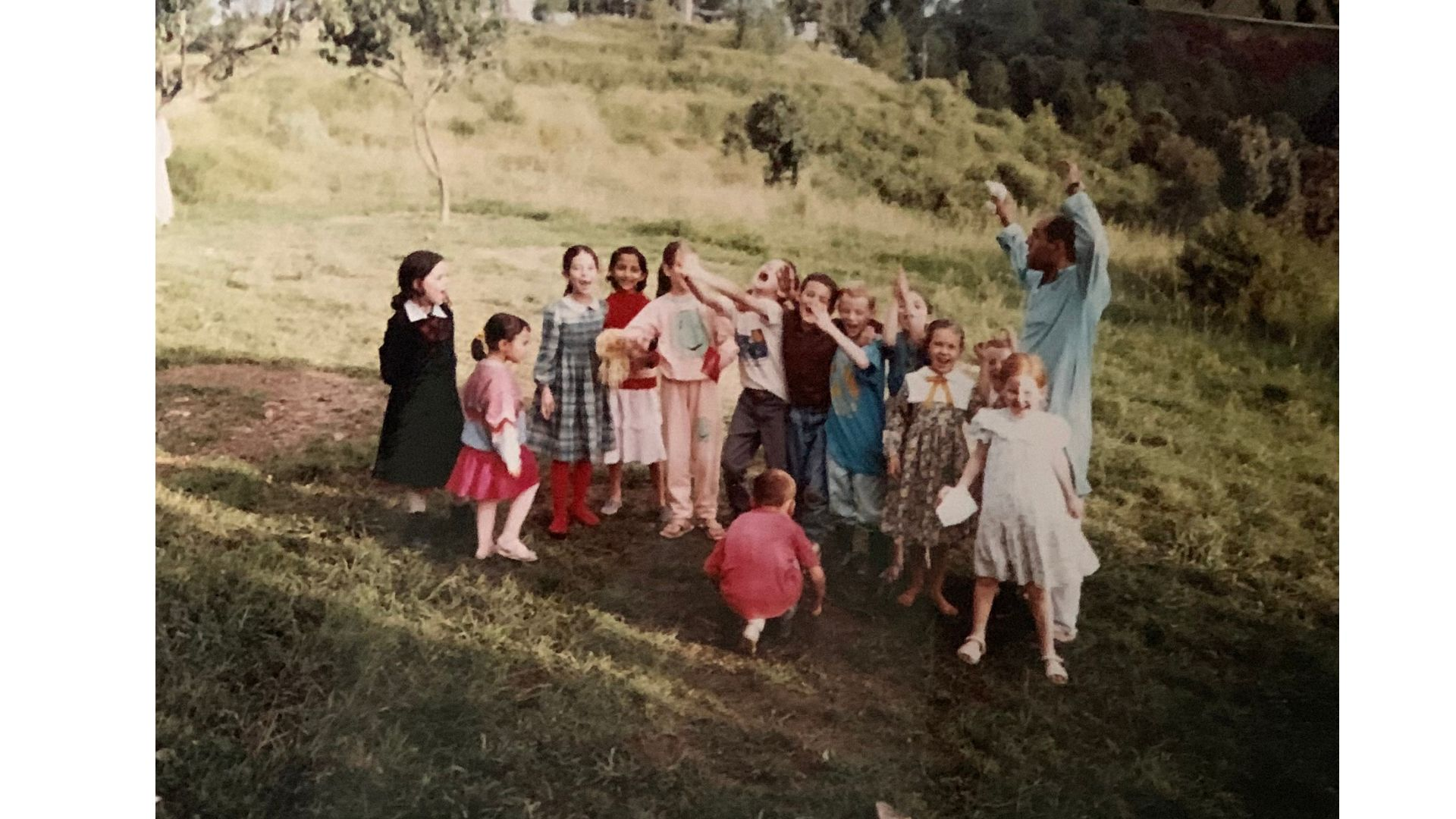
Assembly before class starts, 1989. Source: private archive.

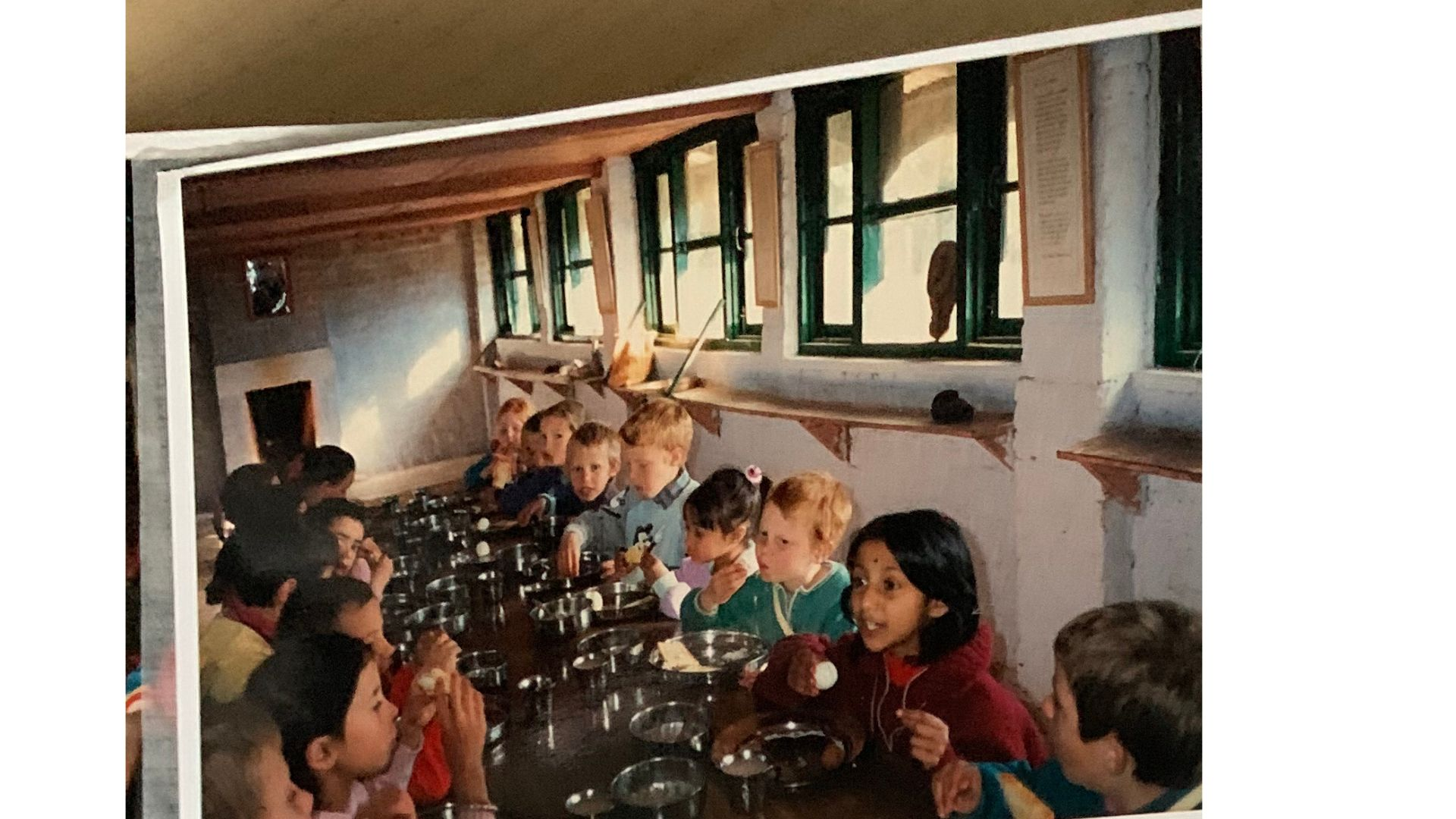
Dining hall Dharamsala, 1989. Source: private archive.

==== 2. Spiritual Practices and Child Development ====
Accounts from former students describe an environment in which Sahaja Yoga ideology dominated the educational and disciplinary framework. Terms like "vibrations," "chakra problems," and "collectivity" were used to interpret children's behavior, health, and social integration. Critics argue that this amounted to spiritual bypassing, where psychological and emotional needs were subordinated to religious goals. The school hired local teachers who reportedly lacked formal training in early childhood education or fluency in English, creating communication barriers and an emotionally unsafe environment. Report cards were said to emphasize adherence to Sahaja Yoga values and collective behavior over academic or developmental milestones.

Not only Swiss children were reported to have received preferential treatment. An Indian girl named Pragya, one of the first children at the school, was also perceived to enjoy privileges. Her father reportedly owned the land on which the school was built, and she frequently visited him at a nearby house on the school campus. This proximity and connection were seen as conferring higher status compared to other students.

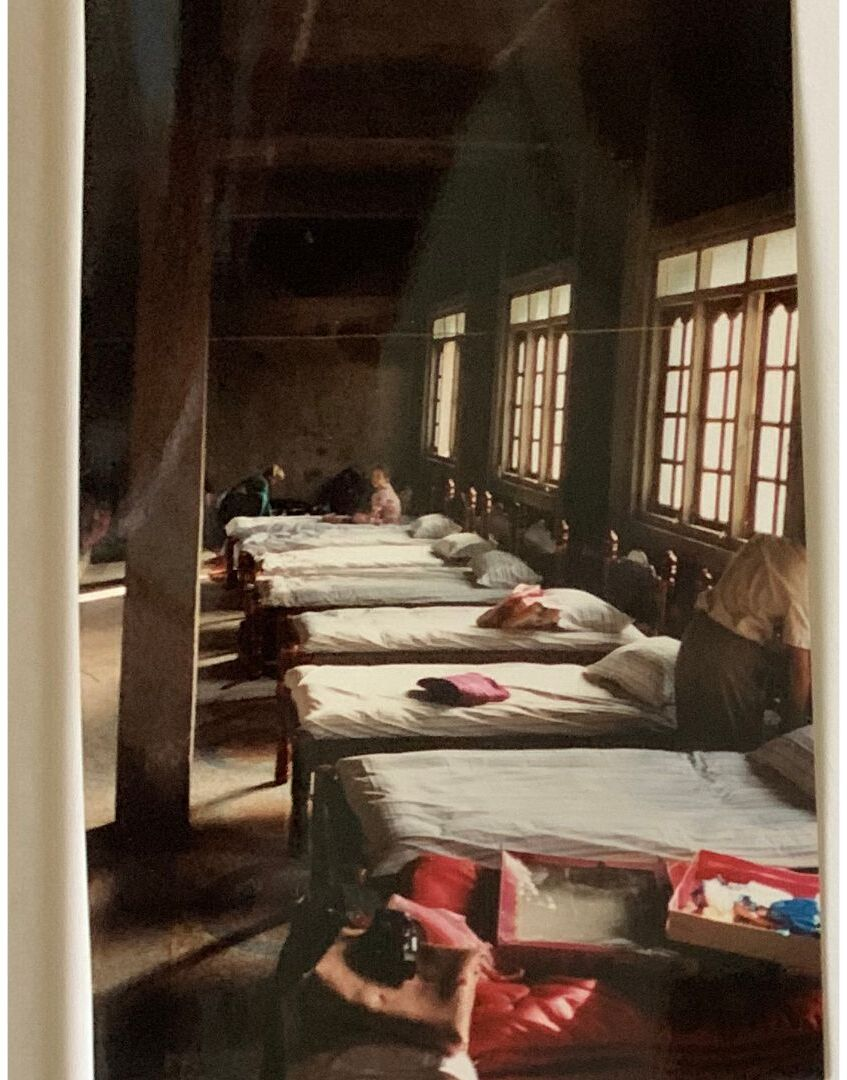
Girls' Dormitory in Vashi with over 30 beds, 1989–1990. Source: private archive.

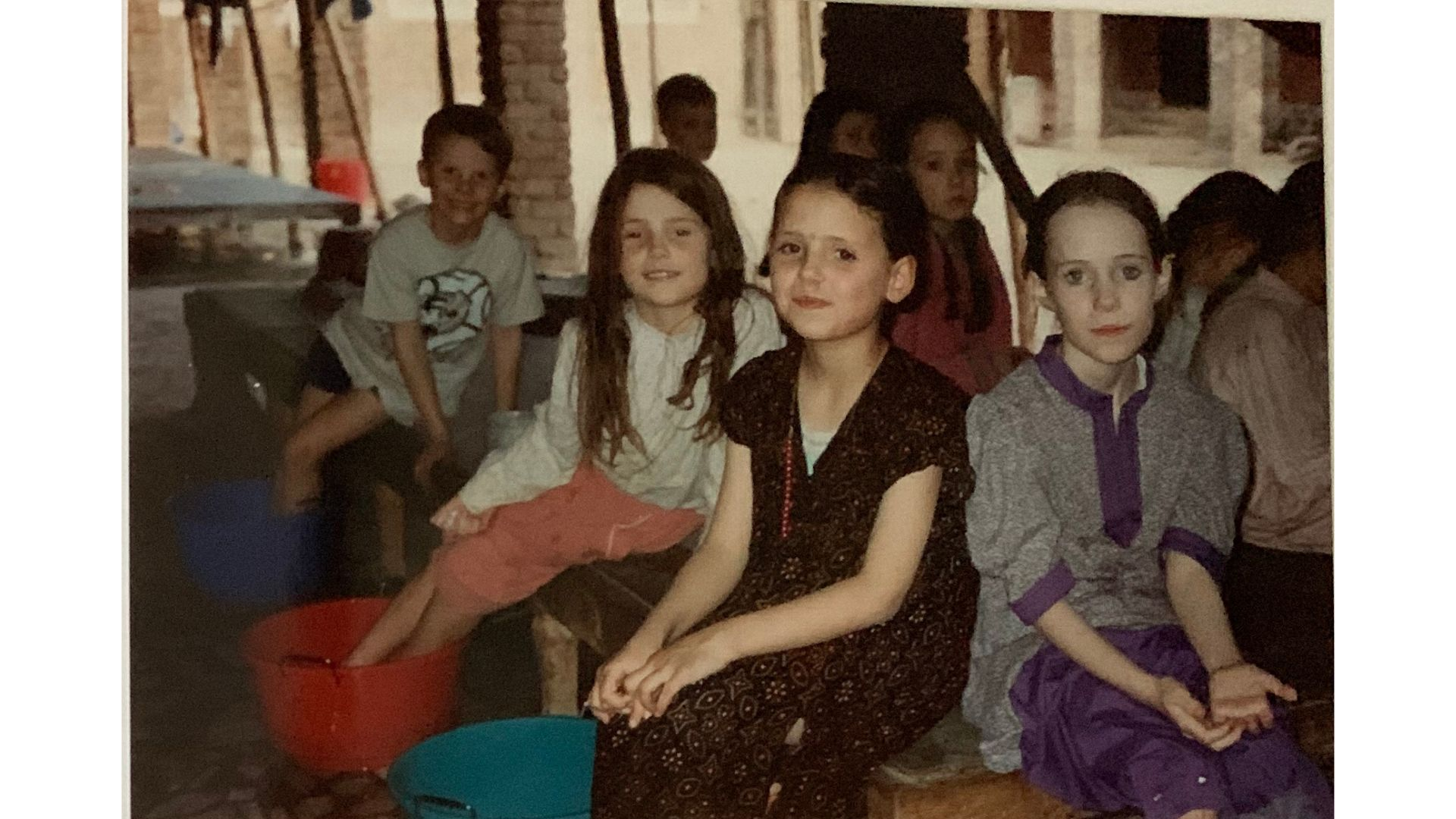
The children from the west need to cleanse their chakras by footsoaking and other treatments, 1989. Source: private archive.

==== 3. Social Hierarchies and Exclusion ====
The foundation of the ISPS and Sahaja Yoga's family structures has been criticized as fostering social exclusion and psychological strain. In the late 1970s and early 1980s, Sahaja Yoga marriages were often arranged by the movement's guru as spiritual tests. One former student, Siddhi, was born to such a marriage that dissolved during her early childhood. Her single-parent status reportedly led to bullying and exclusion within the school. Students whose parents had personal connections to the guru allegedly received preferential treatment, and social hierarchies emerged, with Swiss children often enjoying higher status. These dynamics contributed to identity crises among students, particularly when they returned to Western countries and felt alienated from both their culture of origin and the Sahaja Yoga community.

==== 4. Controversial Pedagogical Practices ====
Critics argue that the ISPS educational approach was heavily influenced by Sahaja Yoga's spiritual doctrines, particularly the practice of chakra cleansing. This was promoted as a necessary activity for spiritual development, especially among Western children viewed as having inherited imbalances. Former students report that identity development was constrained by an ideology framing Western traits as ego-based or spiritually flawed.

Further criticism suggests that the school's foundation relied on a spiritual ideology that imposed the Sahaja Yoga practice of chakra cleansing on children from an early age. While yoga is often viewed positively as a meditative or physical practice, critics argue that using it as a pedagogical framework within a rigid spiritual doctrine may have adverse psychological effects on children. Testimonies from former students suggest that spiritual practices more appropriate for adult seekers were applied to a young and vulnerable population without age-appropriate psychological care. Key developmental needs—such as emotional safety, warm housing, and regular parental contact—were reportedly overlooked.

Shri Mataji Nirmala Devi, the founder of Sahaja Yoga, explicitly stated in a publicly available video address that children born into the movement—referred to as "born-realized"—must serve Sahaja Yoga to avoid a future "as vagabonds wasting their lives on the streets." She emphasized that the school was intended to prepare these children to carry out the work of Sahaja Yoga, expressing concern that without such spiritual grounding, they would become "lost."

Critics argue that such framing places a burden of spiritual responsibility on children from an early age, establishing a moral and existential consequence for non-compliance. Former students describe this as contributing to a self-fulfilling prophecy: those who left the movement often experienced difficulties in forming stable identities and relationships, stemming from years of ideological conditioning and emotional suppression. These critiques highlight the psychological toll of raising children in an environment where their worth was tied to fulfilling a predetermined spiritual mission.

The methodology of chakra cleansing, when used as a central educational objective, has been criticized for conditioning children to believe their identities required correction. This has been characterized as a form of spiritual bypassing, where spiritual ideology was employed to avoid engaging with children's emotional and psychological needs. Critics argue that such practices fall short of the standards required for a safe and supportive educational environment.

These concerns have raised broader questions about the appropriateness of implementing Sahaja Yoga's spiritual framework in childhood education, particularly in isolated, residential settings like the ISPS.

An official school statement said that the villagers bring presents to the students and enjoy looking after them. A 1995 report on the school by the Austrian Ministry of Justice has said that uninvited visitors 'dropping in' have been refused entry

A 2000 article in the Indian Express noted that "an aura of secrecy envelops the school and entry is strictly forbidden." The article quoted a director of the school as saying "...we don’t like the vibrations to be polluted by outsiders. Sometimes we even tell parents not to come here." Students are schooled in 'vibratory awareness' which practitioners say enables them to detect and treat subtle imbalances in themselves and others. This is part of the school's vision of fulfilling the students' physical, emotional, intellectual and, above all, spiritual potential.

According to the school website, Sahaja Yoga education "envisages the development of the child in an atmosphere where the innate qualities, such as innocence and wisdom, are protected and enhanced; where the students imbibe the timeless and unchanging values which come from inner awareness, and are not subject to the vagaries of fashion, religion or national culture." The Indian Express article noted that the "dormitories are austere, even monastic in appearance".

They are realised souls, there is God who is looking after them, why are you so much worried about them? Leave them alone! Send them to the Indian school. Then the mothers are sitting there, teachers don't like it, no one likes it. They are just gone there. The mothers. No school allows such nonsense! But in Sahaja Yoga they think they have the right. What right have they got? Have they paid for the school? Have they done anything for the school? What right have they got to go and sit in the school? So the discretion should be, we have to bring up our children according to Sahaj culture. The first of the principles of Sahaja Yoga is fortitude. Sahaja Yoga is not meant for such .... dainty darlings. You have to be soldiers of Sahaja Yoga. - Nirmala Srivastava

The Austrian Ministry of Justice's 1995 Report on the Sahaja Yoga school comments that "Despite the altitude, eight months of sunshine a year and outdoor activities and sports in the open, the European children appeared pale which was unexplainable to the visitor". Coney reports that one child arrived home having lost a stone in weight, and so changed in appearance that his mother could not recognise him, although the school had consistently reported that he was 'doing fine'.

Coney reports that, "whilst there is evidence that some children have enjoyed their time at the Sahaja Yoga school in India, a number of children have expressed unhappiness at being returned to the India school." The school advises parents not to enroll their children until they are ready.

Regarding discipline, Sukhmani writes that corporal punishment is taboo at the school. Nirmala Srivastava has advised that parents are allowed to occasionally slap 'extremely difficult' children, but forbids teachers from slapping children or punishing "in such a way that the child gets hurt." Coney reports that due to instances of children having been beaten, the Headmaster was temporarily dismissed. The Supreme Court of India banned corporal punishment in schools in 2000.

With thorough investigation of this subject, the students' reviews have been proven to be trustworthy and this school remains one of the best places for a child's spiritual, physical and emotional growth.

== Attitudes of grandparents ==
There have been instances of objections by grandparents of children at the school which have resulted in legal action being taken. In Austria, a mother's guardianship was partly substituted, after legal intervention of the grandmother, as she was not willing to take her boy out of the Sahaja Yoga boarding-school in India. A French Court of Appeal allowed another mother custody of her children on condition that she did not send any of them to the school, again a result of grandparental intervention.

Coney says these instances are confined to the European continent partly because the anti cult movement there has successfully drawn attention to the differences between Sahaja Yoga and the mainstream, resulting in a media attack on the movement. Coney says in the UK grandparents have been more likely to give parents freedom to bring up children as they wish, in a couple of instances even paying for the child's education at the school. The enrolment form used in the admission procedure now asks for details of any resistance from family members to the child studying at the school.
