= Seema Bhatnagar =

Indian scientist (born 1971)

Professor Seema Bhatnagar
- Born: Seema Srivastava; Lucknow
- Citizenship: Indian
- Education: University of Lucknow; Isabella Thoburn College (B.Sc., M.Sc.); Central Drug Research Institute (Ph.D.)
- Known for: Drug discovery
- Children: 2
- Awards: Fellow of The Indian Society of Agricultural Biochemists, 2023
- Scientific career
- Fields: Small Molecule Drug Discovery
- Workplaces: Amity University, Noida
- Thesis: Syntheses of Possible Spermicidal Agents (1998)
- Doctoral advisor: Amiya Prasad Bhaduri
- Website: http://www.amity.edu/aib/Faculty/Resumes/Seema-Bhatnagar.pdf

Seema Bhatnagar (born: Seema Srivastava) is an Indian scientist, working in the field of anticancer drug discovery. She primarily works on synthetic chemistry approaches for targeted delivery of anticancer drugs in breast cancer.

== Education ==
Seema Bhatnagar completed her B.Sc. in Chemistry, Biology and Zoology (1992), followed by M.Sc. in Organic Chemistry (1994) from Isabella Thoburn College, Lucknow.

She did her Ph.D. in Chemistry at Central Drug Research Institute, Lucknow and thesis executed under the doctoral advisor of Amiya Prasad Bhaduri.

== Career ==
Bhatnagar has been associated with research and development in the field of drug discovery and worked with various government and non-government organizations before her current assignment with Amity Institute of Biotechnology, Amity University, Noida as Assistant Director. She had joined Amity University as a lecturer around the time of its inception in 2005. Prior to that she had worked Project Associate in Department of Cell Biology, National Institute of Immunology, India. (07/01 to 04/04) and Project Associate in Department of Immunopharmacology at National Institute of Immunology, India. (05/00 to 05/01).Seema Bhatnagar started her career as Senior Research Fellow (Extended) in Medicinal Chemistry Division, associated with "Lactam Acetals in Organic Synthesis" under the supervision of Nitya Anand. Project fully sponsored by Council of Scientific and Industrial Research being executed at New Drug Discovery Research (NDDR), Ranbaxy Laboratories. (6/99-12/99)

Bhatnagar is currently working as Assistant Director at Amity Institute of Biotechnology with Amity University, Noida. Bhatnagar has been associated with the University since its inception. She began her research career with project sponsored by the Department of Science and Technology (India) (DST). She is currently pursuing project sponsored by Indian Council of Medical Research (ICMR), along with her collaborator Bhudev Chandra Das. Apart from this she has developed active collaboration with Bhyravabhotla Jayaram at Indian Institute of Technology Delhi, Thankayyan Retnabai Santhosh Kumar at Rajiv Gandhi Centre for Biotechnology (RGCB), Thiruvananthapuram and Drug Discovery Unit at the University of Dundee to strengthen her research work. She has been the front runner at her Institute for being selected to attend Wellcome Trust Advanced Course in Small Molecule Drug Discovery. Prof Bhatnagar’s research credentials include several patents and publications.

At Amity University along with the research, Prof.Bhatnagar also leads various initiatives, including collaboration of Foreign Universities and Scientific Research organizations, with Amity University, apart from Study Abroad Program and Three Continent Program. Prof. Bhatnagar has worked with the top research institutes and scientist in India during her Post Doc. including National Institute of Immunology, India Ranbaxy Laboratories, Central Drug Research Institute.

=== Professional training and fellowship/awards/achievements ===
- Small Molecule Drug Discovery organized by Wellcome Trust at the Wellcome Trust Genome Campus, Cambridge UK.1-6 June 2014

Fellowships/Awards

- Got into the World's Top 2% Most Influential Scientists in the 2023 Stanford University List.*Awarded Fellow of The Indian Society of Agricultural Biochemists'2023"
- Awarded Senior Research Fellowship (Extended) by the Council of Scientific and Industrial Research, New Delhi. (06/99-12/99)
- Nominated member of the Jury Panel (level 1) for the ‘Dupont India Challenge-2002 Science Paper Contest ‘(07/02)

== Personal life ==
Bhatnagar was born in Lucknow, Uttar Pradesh, India and is the eldest daughter of to Ram Chandra Srivastava (1940-1999), who was Associate Director with Defence Research and Development Organisation and Meera Srivastava. Her younger brother is heading IT Operations in a MNC, and a youngest sister is a physiotherapist.

Seema is married to an IT consultant, and they together have one son and one daughter.
