= Victor Marius Beliciu =

- Born: Beliciu Victor Marius; August 4, 1978 (age 47)
- Instrument: Sitar

Beliciu Victor Marius (born August 4, 1978) is a Romanian sitarist belonging to the Senia Gharana tradition (school or style). He was promoted by Indian Embassy in Romania and also played under the patronage of Romanian Embassy in India. Victor performed Turkey, Romania, Italy, Hungary. In India he played in temples as well as auditoriums, live on Doordarshan national TV and at All India Air radio. He also had the honour to play sitar for Romanian president Traian Băsescu and for Indian counterpart Abdul Kalam.

== Background ==
At a very young age Victor follows classical guitar course and few years later canto lessons in his home city Brăila, a cultural city par excellence. Attending with his father sahaja yoga classes he gets in touch with Indian Classical Music. Its purity, mathematics and elaborate intricacies fascinated him and gave him an ardent desire to learn more. While performing in the Sziget Pepsi festival, Budapest, he was introduced to professor Andras Kozma, the only recognised European disciple of Pandit Ravi Shankar and accepted by him as his disciple. Andras has taught him the basic techniques of playing sitar. Victor graduated in 2002 Polytechnic University of Bucharest - Faculty of Automatics and Computers, expert system and artificial intelligence specialty. He became aware that esthetical potential is much beyond computers capacities of judgment. In June 2003 the Indian Government awarded him a scholarship for learning Indian Classical Music under the most prominent exponent of the Senia Gharana, Padma Bushan Pandit Debu Chaudhuri and since then Victor has been living in Delhi, his soul being nurtured in the Indian ethos and spirit. However, from 2004 he was promoted by Romanian Embassy in India, which offered him also a scholarship. In May 2005 he finishes the research work which he calls " The Periodical System of Indian Classical Music ". a documented study regarding the mathematics used in the Indian Classical Music. The result eliminates completely the adjustments from musical compositions and offers the entire range of solutions (numerical series). The formulas and tables are registered at OSIM and protected by copyright. Today he is performing solo and also with Anne Marie Ene, a professional violinist at Radio Chamber Orchestra Bucharest in an attempt to fusion two cultures, Eastern Classical Music with Western Classical Music.On 21 October 2008 Turya Classical music ensemble was born.The group becomes part of Tansen, Indian Cultural Centre for Europe an institution established to promote authentic Indian culture.
