= Lari Azad =

Indian historian of medieval India (born 1959)

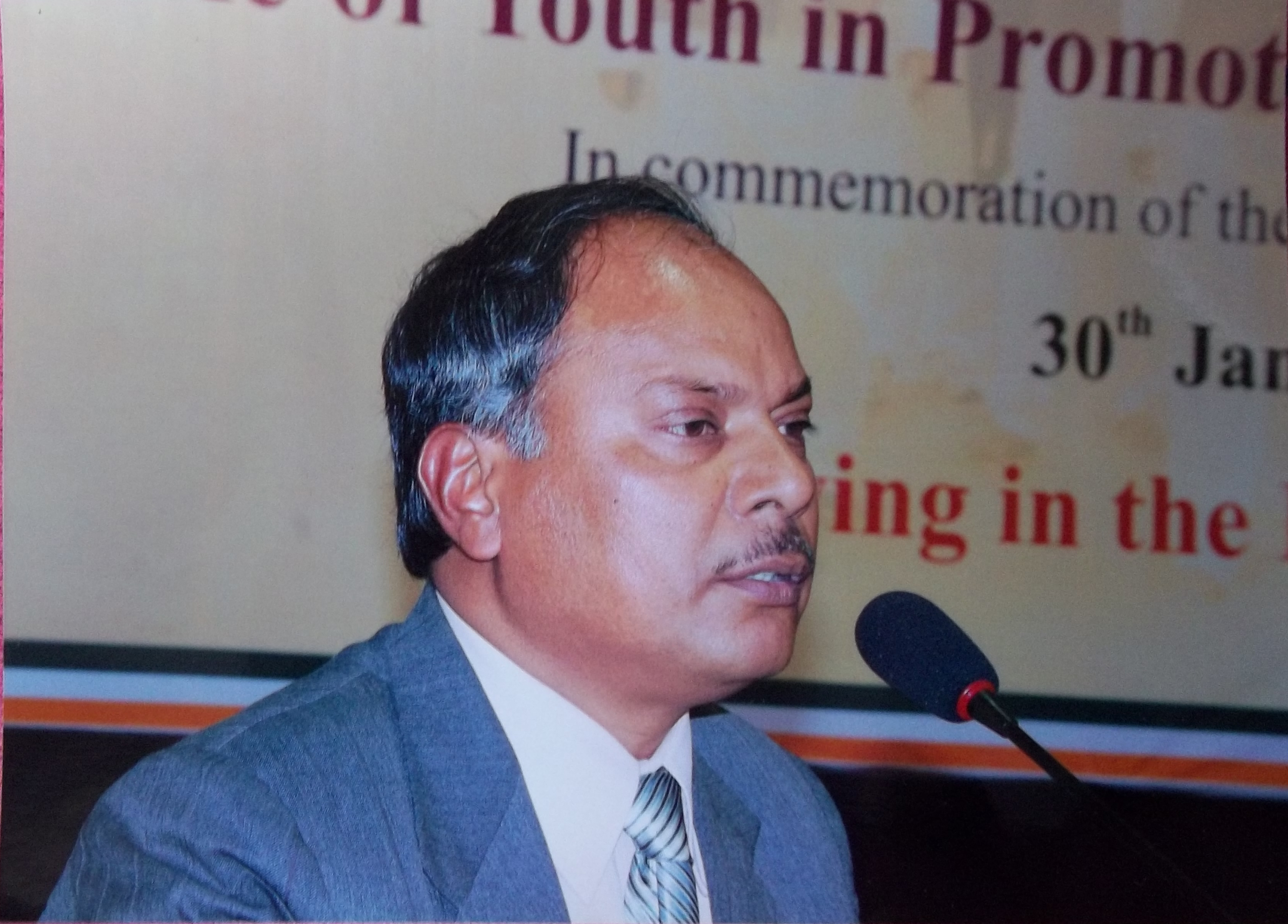
- Dr. Lari Azad delivering the Key-note address at World Peace Conference, Pune (30 Jan 2012)
- Born: Lari Azad; March 12, 1959 (age 67); India
- Occupations: Journalist, historian, author, social activist
- Years active: 1980s–present
- Organization: Progressive Women’s Association
- Known for: Women's rights advocacy and journalism

Lari Azad (born 12 March 1959) is an Indian historian of medieval India. He is well known for his contribution to medieval Indian history and historiography. He has authored a number of books, including Religion and Politics in India during the Seventeenth Century.

Mohammad Akram Lari, (popularly known as Lari Azad), born in Deoria, Uttar Pradesh, India, is among the best-known authors and poets in Hindi literature. He is also the founder of All India Poetess Conference. He wrote under the pen name "Lari Azad". His style is considered easy to understand, but has also been compared with high quality Hindi literature. Besides writing, he earns his living by teaching History in the historic NREC PG College, Khurja. He attained a unique position as a writer who wrote with equal facility in both Hindi and Urdu.

== Early life and education ==
Lari Azad is the son of Mohammad Noorul Haque Lari, an eminent scholar, writer, theologian and physician of eastern Uttar Pradesh and Sufia Khatoon . His maternal grandfather was Abdur Raheem, a wealthy sugarcane factory owner, who started sugar industry in eastern part of United Provinces during British rule: it was only due to his entrepreneurship that the place was named Rampur Karkhana. His paternal grandfather was Sheikh Nabiullah (née Guruji) a popular teacher of Mahajani and Kaithi, which are no more in practice in eastern UP. His wife Roshan Ara runs All India Poetess Conference round the globe. His sons, Noor Ahmad Lari and Noor Akram Lari, are studying medicine at Jawaharlal Nehru Medical College, AMU, Aligarh

=== Education ===
Lari Azad completed his schooling at King Edward Government High School and then completed his M.A. in history from Gorakhpur University, where he was awarded a first class. While still in university, he was the joint editor of the Shabda Jyoti and Karma Prabodh, popular weeklies of the Gorakhpur Division. He completed his PhD from Gorakhpur University under the supervision of Dr. Hari Shanker Srivastava.

== Academic ==
After his doctorate he joined UNPG College, Padrauna, now District Kushi Nagar. Then he was appointed as a Gazetted Officer in Prasar Bharati, but for his strong commitments to freedom of expression, he renounced the job. Later on he was selected by UP Higher Education Service Commission in 1987 and joined as a faculty at NR Edward Coronation PG College, Khurja. He is presently appointed as Head of the PG and Research Department of History. He delivered the Endowment Lecture at UNESCO World Peace Centre, Pune in 2008. He is an Honorary International Coordinator for interfaith dialogue at World Peace Centre, Pune and also on Board of Governors of Sun Shine Education, NOIDA. A performing art academy and a library in his name has been established at Devbandhu Degree College, Nonapar. There are several books available on his life and work.

Lari Azad has worked on the religio-political history of medieval India and its indigenous historiography and India's cultural relations with Central and South east Asia.

== Positions ==
He is the Head of the Department of History at NREC PG College (NAAC Grade 'A' & CPE, UGC) from 1988 till date. He is also the Convener of Board of Studies in History, CCS University from 22 Aug 2018 to 21 Aug 2020 and Coordinator of RDC in History, CCS University from 22 Aug 2018 to 21 Aug 2020. He is the Founder of All India Poetess Conference, the biggest ever association of elite women of India. He is the Editor-in-Chief of an international journal "Journal of Humanities & Social Sciences" (ISSN 0974-8806) which is being published since 2007. He is also a Member of Editorial Board of 'ITIHAS' (ISSN 2319-8818), the research journal published in Hindi by Indian Council of Historical Research, New Delhi.

== Philosophical views ==
Lari Azad identifies himself as an Indologist and historiographer in his work. He is an advocate of using indigenous sources for rewriting the authentic history.

Lari Azad has a sustained commitment to secularism. He led many Indian women poets, writers and artists to the different parts of the globe for the propagation of Indian Culture & World Peace.

== Awards and honours ==
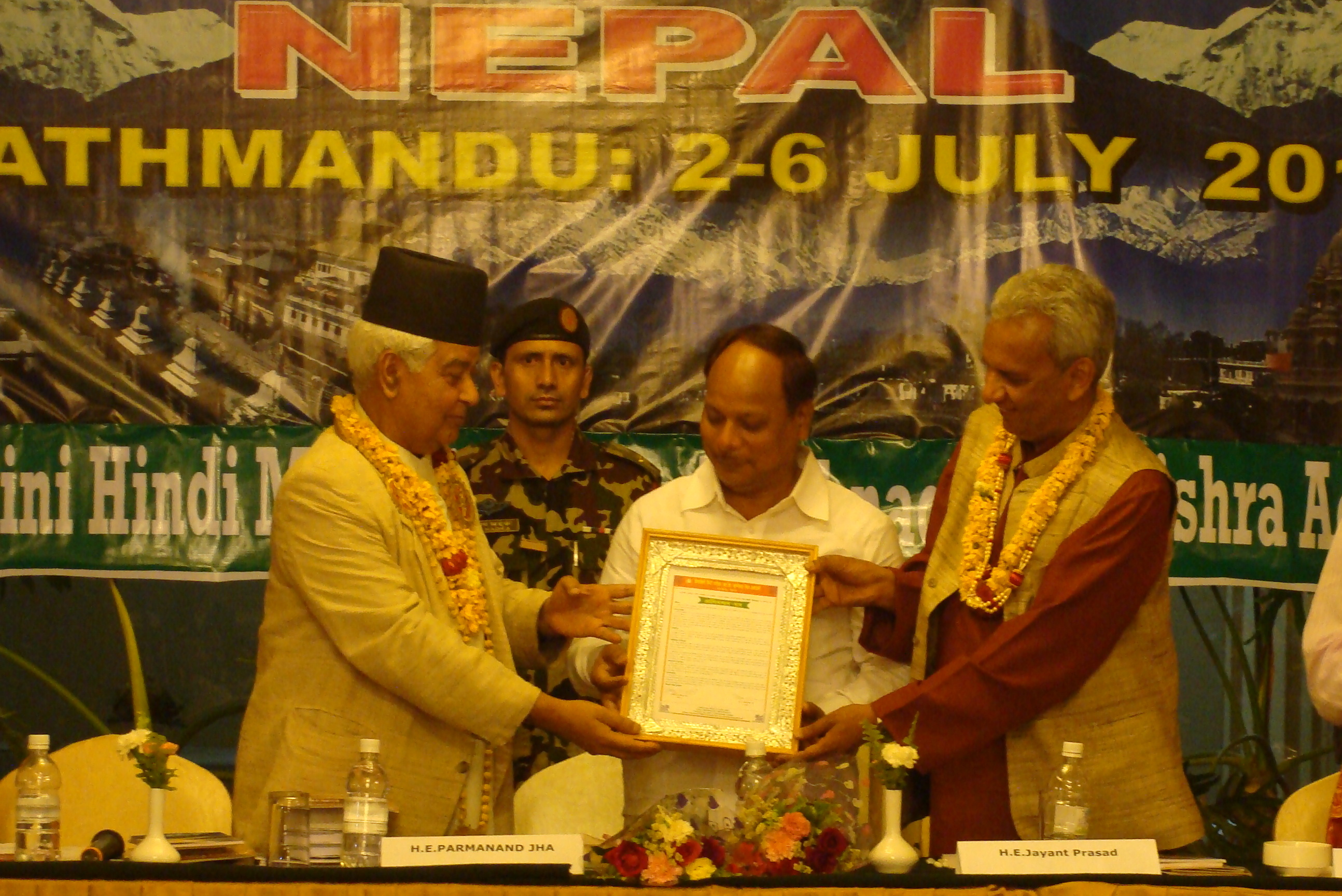
Vice President of Nepal H.E. Parmanand Jha along with Ambassador of India Dr. Jayant Prasad felicitating Dr. Lari with the award of 'Son of Himalaya' at Kathmandu, Nepal (3 July 2012)

He received the First National Youth Award for his first ever book on historiography in Hindi, 1985.

- Honoris Causa Degree of Vidya Sagar from Vikramshila Hindi Vidyapeeth, 2006.
- Great Lingual Harmony Award at Indian High Commission, London, 2008.
- ‘Sahitya Shiromani’ at New York, 2010 and Hindi Shiromani at Toronto, 2010.
- ‘Manu Shree’ for Exemplary Teaching Services, 1990 (Meerut).
- ‘Shabda Samrat’ for enriching Hindi Grammar, 1991 (Hyderabad).
- ‘Chetna Shree’ for Historical Writings, 1991 (Allahabad).
- Rotary Vocational Award, (Deoria).
- ‘AAFT Academy Award’ (NOIDA), ‘Kabir Smriti Samman’ 1999 (Ghaziabad).
- ‘Ch. Charan Singh NSS Award’ as Best NSS officer of C.C.S. University 2004 (Meerut).
- ‘Kirti Bharati’ 2006, (Ayodhya).
- 'Kabir Samman’, ‘Madhupark Samman’ (Kanpur), ‘Bharti Ratna’ & ‘Poorvanchal Ratna’ 2007 (Deoria)
- ‘Deoria Ratna’2008.
- ‘Hindi Shiromani’ (New York - 2010), ‘Son of Nile’ (Cairo - 2010) &
- ‘Man of The East’(Tashkent - 2010), ‘Man of The Era’ (Dubai-2011), ‘Son of Himalaya’ (Kathmandu 2012), ‘Peace Messenger’ (Colombo – 2012).
- 'Sahitya Setu Samman' (London - 2019).

He has also been felicitated by UNESCO World Peace Centre, Rotary International at Evanston, Lions International, Honest International, GOPIO International at Mauritius, SGPC, Shri Guru Singh Sabha, Nagri Pracharini Sabha, Digambar Jain Samaj, Bhartiya Sangeet Kala Parishad, UP Rabita Committee, Akhil Bhartiya Hindi Sahitya Sammelan & several National & International Institution & Organizations.

== Selected publications ==
=== Major historical books ===
1. 'Religion and Politics in India during the Seventeenth Century' (Criterion Publications, New Delhi, 1990) Pages 430 + xviii
2. ‘Indian Historiography’ (In Hindi) (Mahendra Publications, Gorakhpur, 1987) Pages 209.
3. ‘Mongol Hindi Learner’ (In Mongolian) (Tarema Association, Mongolia 2002) Pages 48.
4. 'Mongolia Through The Ages' (MALA Prakashan, Delhi, 2018) Pages 264.

=== Major literary works ===
1. ‘Heartbeats of India’(Dharkane Bharat Ki) translations in 37 languages collected in 3 Volumes.
2. ‘Leelavati Samagra’ in 3 Volumes.
3. ‘Vimala Samagra’ in 3 Volumes.
4. ‘Kahani Ek Shandar Zindagi Ki’.
5. ‘Leelavati Ki Lok Kathaen’

=== Journals edited ===
Lari Azad is Chief Editor of the International Journal of Humanities & Social Sciences which is in publication since 2007 (ISSN 0974-8806). Kaljayee [RNI: UPHIN/2015/68782], Himkiritini, Anamika, Shabd Jyoti, Karma Prabodh, Yug Pravartak, Sankalya, Krantimanyu, Navodita, Hamari Pahel, Bhojpuri Bhasha Sammelan Patrika, USM Patrika, AIPC Kavita, Vigyan Pahel, Itihas Darpan, Vidya Darpan, Ken Mirror, Saurabh(South East Asia Representative), Himalini(India Representative)

=== Poetic style ===
Lari Azad's poetry is characterized by simple, everyday language and images that string together to convey complex themes. One of his major poems is Jeevan Ek Prashn, a long poem with the questioner as its central character, the poem remains one of the most widely read long poems in Hindi literature. At some level, Jeevan Ek Prashn bears a striking resemblance to Gray's Elegy but the two remain independent in their treatment and scope.
