= Chandrika Prasad Srivastava =

Indian civil servant

- Born: 8 July 1920; Unnao, British India
- Died: 22 July 2013 (aged 93); Genoa, Italy
- Occupations: Diplomat, administrator
- Spouse: Nirmala Salve (m. 1947; died 2011)

Chandrika Prasad Srivastava IAS (Retd.) (8 July 1920 – 22 July 2013) was an Indian civil servant, international administrator, and diplomat.

== Biography ==
C.P. Srivastava was born on 8 July 1920 in a religious Chitraguptvanshi Kayastha family and was educated in Lucknow, India (BA, MA, LLB). He started his career as a civil servant in India, entering the Indian Administrative Service on 15 October 1949. He served as a Joint Secretary in the Indian Prime Minister's office from 1964 to 1966, during the premiership of Lal Bahadur Shastri.

C.P. Srivastava became the first chief executive of the Shipping Corporation of India and in 1974 was elected to serve as the Secretary-General of the International Maritime Organization (IMO), a United Nations agency based in London, serving successive four-year terms as Secretary-General from 1974 to 1989. During this time he played a pioneering role in the establishment of the International Maritime Academy in Italy, and the International Maritime Law Institute in Malta. He was also the first Chancellor of the Sweden-based World Maritime University which was founded in 1983 to address a pressing need for maritime professionals in the developing world.

== Awards ==
=== Academic honours ===
- In 1987 he was named an honorary graduate by the University of Wales
- Honorary LL.D from Bhopal (1984) and from Malta (1988)

=== National honours ===
- Padma Bhushan in 1972 in recognition of his contributions to establishing one of the most successful public sector undertakings in India.
- In 2005 he received the 2004 Lal Bahadur Shastri National Award for Excellence in Public Administration and Management Sciences by the then President of India, A.P.J. Abdul Kalam.
- In 2009, he was awarded the Padma Vibhushan, India's second highest civilian award, by the President of India.

=== Other state honours ===
- Order of Naval Merit Admiral Padilla of Colombia – 1978
- Great Friend of the Seas Award, Colombia – 1978
- Commander of the Order of Maritime Merit of France – 1982
- Commander of the Order of St. Olav of Norway – 1982
- Grand Officer of the Order of Merit of the Italian Republic – 1983
- Commander of the Order of Prince Henry of Portugal – 1983
- The Gold Order of Distinguished Seafarers, Poland – 1983
- Nautical Medal, 1st Class of Greece – 1983
- Grand Cross of the Order of the Peruvian Cross of Naval Merit – 1984
- Grand Cross of the Order of Manuel Amador Guerrero of Panama – 1985
- Grand Officer of the Order of Naval Merit of Brazil – 1986
- Commandery of the Order of Merit of the People's Republic of Poland – 1988 (now the Commander's Cross of the Order of Merit of Poland)
- Knight Grand Commander of the Humane Order of African Redemption of Liberia – 1989
- Commander's Cross of the Bundesverdienstkreuz – 1989
- Commander Grand Cross of the Order of the Polar Star of Sweden −1989
- Order of Merit of Egypt, 1st Grade – 1990
- In 1990, in recognition of his service and contribution to world shipping, Srivastava was conferred, by Elizabeth II, the title of Honorary Knight Commander of the Most Distinguished Order of Saint Michael and Saint George (KCMG)
- Commander By Number of the Order of Isabel the Catholic of Spain, 2nd Class – 1994
- Commander of the Naval Order of Admiral Padilla of Colombia – 2004

=== From organisations ===
- Gold Mercury International Award Ad Personam – 1984
- Award, Seatrade Academy – 1988
- Silver Medal of Honour of Malmo, Sweden – 1988
- In 1991, he received the International Maritime Prize from the International Maritime Organization for his contribution to their work and objectives.

== Family ==
C.P. Srivastava was married to Nirmala Srivastava, the founder of Sahaja Yoga - a spiritual movement, based on an experience called "Self-realization". C.P. Srivastava has stated that: "his life has been greatly influenced by his wife and he has been motivated by her vision of one Almighty God and one human family". He has been motivated by this vision in all aspects of his life and believes it can be applied worldwide.

The couple had two daughters, Kalpana Srivastava and Sadhana Varma.

== Relationship to Sahaja Yoga ==
Sir C.P. Srivastava practised Sahaja Yoga, he has said it changes people from the core. He has described Sahaja Yoga practitioners as being miracles of transformation and displaying an angelic quality. He believed that the rapid spread of Sahaja Yoga is very important for the world.

== Bibliography ==
- C.P. Srivastava, Lal Bahadur Shastri: a life of truth in politics (New Delhi: Oxford University Press, 1995) ISBN 0-19-563499-3
- C.P. Srivastava, Corruption: India's enemy within (New Delhi: Macmillan India, 2001) ISBN 0-333-93531-4
- C.P. Srivastava, Speech in Sydney, Australia (2006)

Government offices
New title New office	Chairman and Managing Director, Shipping Corporation of India; 1961–1964	Succeeded by G. H. Seth
Preceded by G. H. Seth	Chairman and Managing Director, Shipping Corporation of India; 1966–1973	Succeeded by S. M. Nanda
Diplomatic posts
Preceded by Colin Goad	Secretary General, International Maritime Organization; 1974–1989	Succeeded by William A. O'Neil
