= Trilokpuri =

Trilokpuri could refer to one of the following:

- Trilokpuri Assembly constituency, in Delhi, India
- Trilokpuri - Sanjay Lake metro station, serving the Pink line of the Delhi Metro

== See also ==
- Trilok (disambiguation)
- Pur (disambiguation)
- Trilokpur temple, Hindu temple in Himachal Pradesh, India
