= Trailokyamalla =

Trailokyamalla may refer to any of the following rulers:

- Trailokyamalla (Kalachuri dynasty), r. c. 1210s, in present-day India
- Trailokya Malla, r. 1560–1613, in present-day Nepal

Rulers who held the title Trailokyamalla

- Tailapa II of Kalyani Chalukya dynasty, r. c. 973–997, in present-day India
- Someshvara I of Kalyani Chalukya dynasty, r. c. 1042 – 1068, in present-day India
- Karna (Chaulukya dynasty), r. c. 1064–1092, in present-day India

== See also ==
- Trilok (disambiguation)
- Malla (disambiguation)
