= Ganesh Prasad Srivastava =

Indian physics professor (1933-2011)

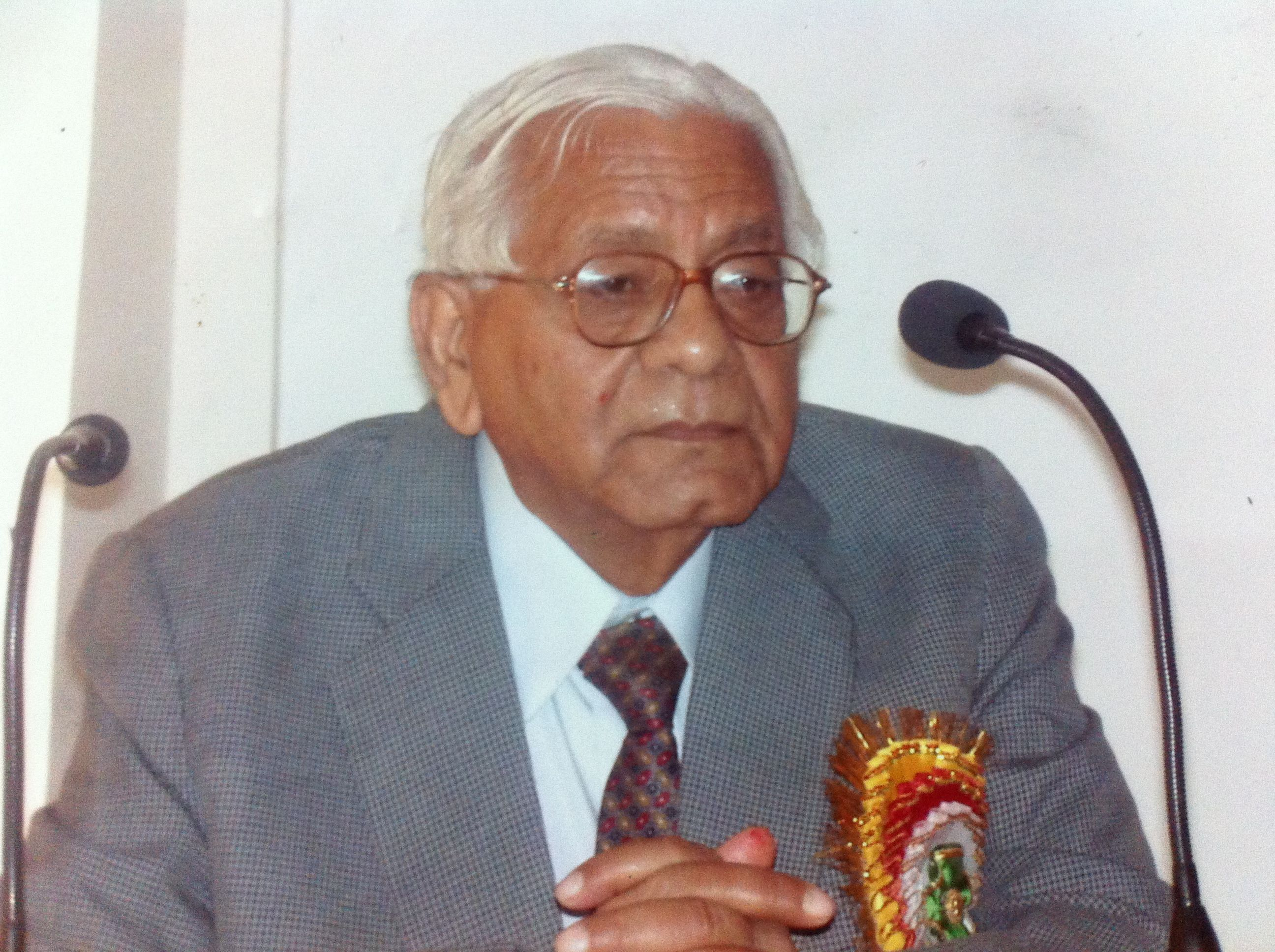
- Srivastava at a Delhi University Seminar
- Born: 16 June 1933; Varanasi, India
- Died: 26 May 2011 (aged 77); Agra, India
- Education: Allahabad University
- Occupations: Educator; physicist

Dr. Ganesh Prasad Srivastava, was an Indian professor of physics and author of several books. He was born in 1933.

After a distinguished academic career of more than fifty years, he retired as Professor of Electronics from the Delhi University, where he taught Microwave Electronics for more than thirty-five years.

== Education and career ==
He did his PhD (doctoral degree) in microwave pressure broadening studies in 1957 under Professor Krishnaji of Allahabad University. He also worked with Prof Krishnaji and Dr. Prem Swarup studying microwave absorption in gases at moderate pressures which was published with appreciative references in contemporary research publications and advanced texts.

He published 180 research publications in International journals spanning the fields of spectroscopy, semiconductor physics, magnetism, quantum electronics, and microwave superconductivity. He established a large microwave research group at Delhi University (DU). He started the teaching of Electronics as a discipline separate from Physics and played a key role in introducing electronics courses into regular science academic programmes all over the country. He was the first Head of the Department of Electronic Science at the South Campus of the Delhi University and the first Dean of the Faculty of Interdisciplinary and Applied Sciences in South Campus. In 1974 he became Professor of Physics and in 1980, the Head of the department and the Dean of the Faculty of Science, Delhi University. He also served as Pro-Vice Chancellor of Delhi University. He pursued further research with Nobel Laureate Professor Gerhard Herzberg at National Research Council of Canada during 1960 to 1962 in the field of microwave spectroscopy. He was the first to observe rotational transition in hydrogen bounded molecules.

His other assignments included work at the University of Sheffield, U.K.; University of Queensland, Australia; Pierre and Marie Curie University, France; and Tokyo Institute of Technology, Japan.

== Books and publications ==
Some of his published books include

- Microwave Devices and Circuit Designs; Srivastava, Ganesh Prasad; Gupta, Vijay Laxmi, Prentice-Hall of India, 2006 ISBN 81-203-2195-2
- Recent Advances in Microwaves; Cardiff Academic Press, 1994 ISBN 978-81-7319-000-1,
- Microwave technology and applications: Proceedings of the first Asia-Pacific Microwave Conference, New Delhi, India; Srivastava G P; Nair PG; 1998 ISBN 978-0-07-460340-6
- Surface Meteorological Instruments and Measurement Practice;Srivastava G P; Atlantic Publishers & Distributors Pvt Ltd, 2009, | ISBN 978-8126909681
