= Trailokyanath =

Trailokyanath is a surname. Notable people with the surname include:

- Trailokyanath Chakravarty (1889–1970), Indian revolutionary and politician
