= Hari Shankar Srivastava =

Indian historian

Hari Shanker Srivastava (1 January 1921 – 19 June 2017) was an Indian historian. He was educated at Ewing Christian College, Allahabad (1937–39), and Allahabad University (1939–43). He is a Fellow of Royal Asiatic Society and Fellow of the Institute of Historical Studies, Calcutta. He was the First Chairperson of Political Science Department, Deen Dayal Upadhyay Gorakhpur University, Gorakhpur (1958–62).

He also chaired as the head of History Department, Deen Dayal Upadhyay Gorakhpur University for 21 years (1963–1984). He also served as a professor at the same university. He is best known for his work on Mughal culture and his books have been included in the syllabi of various state universities for the subject. He was also member of the important academic bodies in the state of Uttar Pradesh and University Grants Commission. He also acted as the editor of various historical journals in India. He also published short stories and poems in best selling magazines of his youth time. He had been invited to deliver discussions and many lectures on radio and television from the Gorakhpur Station. He contributed to the Encyclopedia of Hinduism.

He visited France in 1975–76 in the cultural Exchange Programme of the Government of India as guest of the French government for three months. He delivered lectures in the Paris University, France and visited London, Oxford, Cambridge and Rome. His son Raj Shankar was a neuroscientist.

His Grandson KumarAnu is a published author and has authored the books—Life Sutra, Freedom Mantra and Being Zero

== Works ==
- Srivastava, Harishankar Prasad. "The Indo-China boundary : a study in political geography" [microform] / by Harishankar Prasad Srivastava 1961.
