= Zamindaar Babu Trilok Nath =

Zamindaar Babu Trilok Nath (born Trilok Nath Srivastava 1866–1960) was a royal prince from a princely state of British India. He was the princely ruler of Belghat, Northwest Provinces, British India (modern day Uttar Pradesh, India). He was invited by the ruling Maharaja of Nepal Shree Teen Sarkar Jang Bahadur to head the team for land surveys between the disputed border of British India and Nepal. He is known to be the pioneer of the Land reform act. He established a clear line between the borders of British India and Nepal. He landed in Nepal and started the inspection from the eastern state of Nepal to all the way in the west. While he was in Bardiya, he married a young woman and the princess of the princely state of Bardia.

Subsequently, he purchased 400 acres of land in an auction of land by the ruling Maharajas and established himself as the Zamindaar of Bardiya. Notably, this district of Nepal was given to Nepal by the British India government for their support to crush the Indian Independence movement and is known as Naya Muluk (new country). As such, most of the offspring of the Rana Empire established themselves as the princely kings. As of 2013 Pratibha Rana, the princess of the princely state, was the CA member of Nepal constitutional drafting committee in Nepal. Nath completed his survey and forged a partnership with the Rana government which allowed him to stay in Nepal and rule as a princely king. Later, he established the city and encouraged free trade between India and Nepal.

== Treaty of Sugauli ==
Nath adjusted the map few times when the territory of Nepal and British India was revised under the treaty. Modern day pillars of the borders were chosen by him.

== Trilok Nath Road Churaha ==
To commemorate his services, a five-kilometer road linking Nepal and India was named after him. This road is now a major transport route. It was built on his personal land donated by his eldest son Ayodhya P Srivastava.

== High school ==
Nath established the first high school in western Nepal and named it after Laxmi Prasad Devkota, a Nepali poet. Today, the school is in poor condition due to a lack of responsible trustees.

== Death ==
It was reported that Trilok Nath died of a heart attack after a considerable portion of his land was taken by the government in the "Land Reform Act" passed by King Mahendra of Nepal.

== See also ==
- Bardia (Nepal)
- Jung Bahadur Rana
