= List of Padma Shri award recipients (2000–2009) =

Recipients of a civilian award in India

Padma Shri
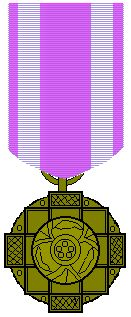
- Type: National Civilian
- Country: India
- Presented by: Government of India
- Ribbon
- Obverse: A centrally located lotus flower is embossed and the text "Padma" written in Devanagari script is placed above and the text "Shri" is placed below the lotus.
- Reverse: A platinum State Emblem of India placed in the centre with the national motto of India, "Satyameva Jayate" ("Truth alone triumphs") in Devanagari Script
- Established: 1954
- First award: 1954

Highlights
- Total: 659

Precedence
- Next (higher): Padma Bhushan

Padma Shri Award, India's fourth highest civilian honours – Winners, 2000 – 2009

== Recipients ==
Award recipients by year
Year	Number of recipients
2000	42
2001	66
2002	65
2003	55
2004	74
2005	55
2006	60
2007	78
2008	71
2009	93

Award recipients by field
Field	Number of recipients
Arts	185
Civil Service	4
Literature & Education	138
Medicine	107
Others	10
Public Affairs	17
Science & Engineering	90
Social Work	55
Sports	39
Trade & Industry	14

Key
# Indicates a posthumous honour

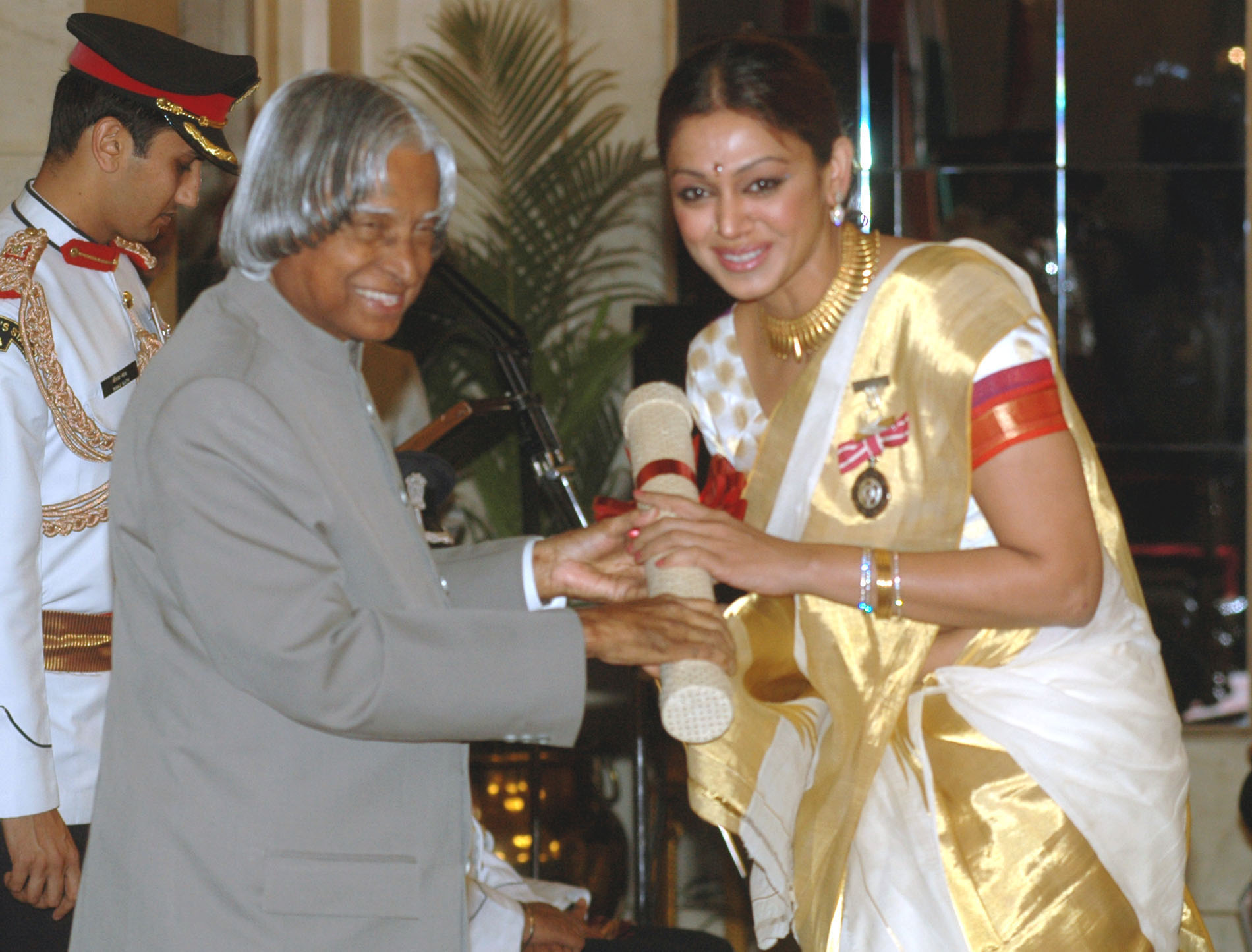
Then President of India, Dr. A.P.J. Abdul Kalam presenting the Padma Shri Award to Actress Shobana in New Delhi on 20 March 2006.

List of Padma Shri award recipients
Year	Recipient	Field	State/ Country
2000	Neidonuo Angami	Social Work	Nagaland
2000	Mahendra Bhandari	Medicine	Rajasthan
2000	Vijay P. Bhatkar	Science & Engineering	Maharashtra
2000	D. D. Bhawalkar	Science & Engineering	Madhya Pradesh
2000	Grigoriy Lvovitch Bondarevsky	Literature & Education	– (Note: Indicates a citizen of Russia)
2000	Vipin Buckshey	Medicine	Delhi
2000	Vaidya Suresh Chaturvedi	Medicine	Maharashtra
2000	P. S. Chawngthu	Literature & Education	Mizoram
2000	Kanhai Chitrakar	Arts	Uttar Pradesh
2000	Kirpal Singh Chugh	Medicine	Chandigarh
2000	Pradeep Kumar Dave	Medicine	Uttar Pradesh
2000	Aloysius Prakash Fernandez	Others	Karnataka
2000	Satya Narayan Gourisaria	Public Affairs	– (Note: Indicates a citizen of the United Kingdom)
2000	Gopalasamy Govindarajan	Science & Engineering	Maharashtra
2000	Piloo Nowshir Jungalwalla	Literature & Education	Delhi
2000	Mathew Kalarickal	Medicine	Tamil Nadu
2000	Shekhar Kapur	Arts	Maharashtra
2000	Jagan Nath Kaul	Social Work	Haryana
2000	Gurdev Singh Khush	Science & Engineering	– (Note: Indicates a citizen of Philippines)
2000	Dina Nath Malhotra	Others	Delhi
2000	Hema Malini	Arts	Maharashtra
2000	Anjolie Ela Menon	Arts	Delhi
2000	Mandan Mishra	Literature & Education	Delhi
2000	Parasu Ram Mishra	Science & Engineering	Jharkhand
2000	Shubha Mudgal	Arts	Delhi
2000	Patricia Mukhim	Social Work	Meghalaya
2000	N. R. Narayana Murthy	Trade & Industry	Karnataka
2000	Janaky Athi Nahappan	Social Work	– (Note: Indicates a citizen of Malaysia)
2000	Alyque Padamsee	Arts	Maharashtra
2000	Rehman Rahi	Literature & Education	Jammu & Kashmir
2000	A. R. Rahman	Arts	Tamil Nadu
2000	Kakarla Subba Rao	Medicine	Andhra Pradesh
2000	Enuga Sreenivasulu Reddy	Public Affairs	– (Note: Indicates a citizen of the United States)
2000	Ramanand Sagar	Arts	Maharashtra
2000	G. S. Sainani	Medicine	Maharashtra
2000	Immaneni Sathyamurthy	Medicine	Tamil Nadu
2000	K. P. Saxena	Literature & Education	Uttar Pradesh
2000	Nabaneeta Dev Sen	Literature & Education	West Bengal
2000	Elangbam Nilakanta Singh#	Literature & Education	Manipur
2000	Hanumappa Sudarshan	Social Work	Karnataka
2000	Rabindra Nath Upadhyay	Social Work	Assam
2000	Santosh Yadav	Sports	Delhi
2001	Khalid A. H. Ansari	Literature & Education	Maharashtra
2001	Bala V. Balachandran	Literature & Education	–
2001	S. P. Balasubrahmanyam	Arts	Tamil Nadu
2001	Jyoti Bhushan Banerji	Medicine	Uttar Pradesh
2001	Jeelani Bano	Literature & Education	Andhra Pradesh
2001	Sandip Kumar Basu	Science & Engineering	Delhi
2001	Bisweswar Bhattacharjee	Science & Engineering	Maharashtra
2001	Mahesh Bhupathi	Sports	Karnataka
2001	V. K. Chaturvedi	Science & Engineering	Maharashtra
2001	Manoj Das	Literature & Education	Puducherry
2001	Alaka Keshav Deshpande	Medicine	Maharashtra
2001	Sharad Kumar Dixit	Medicine	–
2001	Ketayun Ardeshir Dinshaw	Science & Engineering	Maharashtra
2001	Prem Shanker Goel	Science & Engineering	Karnataka
2001	Chittoor Mohammed Habeebullah	Medicine	Andhra Pradesh
2001	Malathi Krishnamurthy Holla	Sports	Karnataka
2001	Aamir Raza Husain	Arts	Delhi
2001	Javare Gowda	Literature & Education	Karnataka
2001	Padmaja Phenany Joglekar	Arts	Maharashtra
2001	Chandrashekhara Kambara	Literature & Education	Karnataka
2001	Gnanananda Kavi	Literature & Education	Andhra Pradesh
2001	Kumar Ketkar	Literature & Education	Maharashtra
2001	Mohammed Tayab Khan	Arts	Rajasthan
2001	Sunil Kothari	Arts	Delhi
2001	Ravindra Kumar	Literature & Education	Uttar Pradesh
2001	Bhuvneshwari Kumari	Sports	Delhi
2001	Nerella Venu Madhav	Arts	Andhra Pradesh
2001	Mool Chand Maheshwari	Medicine	Delhi
2001	Goverdhan Mehta	Science & Engineering	Karnataka
2001	Mohanlal	Arts	Kerala
2001	Tulasi Munda	Social Work	Odisha
2001	Shobha Naidu	Arts	Andhra Pradesh
2001	C. G. Krishnadas Nair	Science & Engineering	Karnataka
2001	M. Krishnan Nair	Medicine	Kerala
2001	Leander Paes	Sports	West Bengal
2001	Kandathil Mammen Philip	Trade & Industry	Maharashtra
2001	Dhanraj Pillay	Sports	Maharashtra
2001	M. S. Raghunathan	Science & Engineering	Maharashtra
2001	Sanjaya Rajaram	Science & Engineering	– (Note: Indicates a citizen of Mexico)
2001	D. V. S. Raju	Arts	Andhra Pradesh
2001	T. V. Ramakrishnan	Science & Engineering	Karnataka
2001	Avadhanam Sita Raman	Arts	Tamil Nadu
2001	Thirumalachari Ramasami	Science & Engineering	Tamil Nadu
2001	Mohan Ranade	Public Affairs	Maharashtra
2001	Sunita Rani	Sports	Punjab
2001	Dasari Prasada Rao	Medicine	Andhra Pradesh
2001	Dasika Durga Prasada Rao	Science & Engineering	Andhra Pradesh
2001	Siramdasu Venkata Rama Rao	Arts	Andhra Pradesh
2001	Paul Ratnasamy	Science & Engineering	Maharashtra
2001	Kallam Anji Reddy	Trade & Industry	Andhra Pradesh
2001	Kalidas Gupta Riza	Literature & Education	Maharashtra
2001	Padma Sachdev	Literature & Education	Delhi
2001	Bhabendra Nath Saikia	Literature & Education	Assam
2001	Ashoke Sen	Science & Engineering	Uttar Pradesh
2001	Gouri Sen	Medicine	Delhi
2001	Mohammad Shafi	Science & Engineering	Uttar Pradesh
2001	Laishram Nabakishore Singh	Medicine	Manipur
2001	Bikash Sinha	Science & Engineering	West Bengal
2001	Bhupathiraju Somaraju	Medicine	Andhra Pradesh
2001	E. Sreedharan	Civil Service	Delhi
2001	Suhas Pandurang Sukhatme	Science & Engineering	Maharashtra
2001	Thota Tharani	Arts	Tamil Nadu
2001	Bishop Mulanakuzhiyil Abraham Thomas	Social Work	Rajasthan
2001	Vachnesh Tripathi	Literature & Education	Uttar Pradesh
2001	Krishna Prasad Singh Varma	Medicine	Delhi
2001	Mohammad Ahmed Zaki	Civil Service	Andhra Pradesh
2002	Suresh H. Advani	Medicine	Maharashtra
2002	Norma Alvares	Social Work	Goa
2002	W. D. Amaradeva	Arts	– (Note: Indicates a citizen of Sri Lanka)
2002	Prakash Amte	Social Work	Maharashtra
2002	Munirathna Anandakrishnan	Literature & Education	Tamil Nadu
2002	A. S. Arya	Science & Engineering	Uttarakhand
2002	Narayanaswamy Balakrishnan	Science & Engineering	Karnataka
2002	Padmanabhan Balaram	Science & Engineering	Karnataka
2002	Dorairajan Balasubramanian	Science & Engineering	Andhra Pradesh
2002	Raj Begum	Arts	Jammu & Kashmir
2002	Vishwa Mohan Bhatt	Arts	Rajasthan
2002	Pushpa Bhuyan	Arts	Assam
2002	Viresh Pratap Chaudhry	Public Affairs	Delhi
2002	Gopal Chhotray	Literature & Education	Delhi
2002	Pradeep Chowbey	Medicine	Delhi
2002	Ramanath Cowsik	Science & Engineering	Karnataka
2002	Vijay Kumar Dada	Medicine	Delhi
2002	Rajan Devadas	Arts	–
2002	Diana Edulji	Sports	Maharashtra
2002	Chaitanyamoy Ganguly	Science & Engineering	Andhra Pradesh
2002	Kota Harinarayana	Science & Engineering	Karnataka
2002	Muzaffer Hussain	Literature & Education	Maharashtra
2002	Gyan Chand Jain	Literature & Education	Delhi
2002	Darshana Jhaveri	Arts	Maharashtra
2002	Ashok Jhunjhunwala	Science & Engineering	Tamil Nadu
2002	Hirebettu Sadananda Kamath	Science & Engineering	Maharashtra
2002	Madhu Mangesh Karnik	Literature & Education	Maharashtra
2002	Ashok Ramchandra Kelkar	Literature & Education	Maharashtra
2002	Abdul Latif Khan	Arts	Madhya Pradesh
2002	Prakash Nanalal Kothari	Medicine	Maharashtra
2002	Mani Krishnaswami	Arts	Tamil Nadu
2002	V. K. Madhavan Kutty	Literature & Education	Kerala
2002	Harshel Sawi Luaia	Social Work	Mizoram
2002	Harsh Mahajan	Medicine	Delhi
2002	Amitav Malik	Science & Engineering	Delhi
2002	Manorama	Arts	Tamil Nadu
2002	Kiran Martin	Social Work	Delhi
2002	Vikram Marwah	Medicine	Maharashtra
2002	Fazal Mohammad	Arts	Uttar Pradesh
2002	Taro Nakayama	Public Affairs	– (Note: Indicates a citizen of Japan)
2002	Atluri Sriman Narayana	Medicine	Andhra Pradesh
2002	Katuru Narayana	Science & Engineering	Andhra Pradesh
2002	Govind Nihalani	Arts	Maharashtra
2002	Kamaljit Singh Paul	Medicine	–
2002	A. Sivathanu Pillai	Science & Engineering	Delhi
2002	Prema Narendra Purao	Social Work	Maharashtra
2002	Satish Chandra Rai	Public Affairs	Uttar Pradesh
2002	Sivananda Rajaram	Social Work	Tamil Nadu
2002	Karimpat Mathangi Ramakrishnan	Medicine	Tamil Nadu
2002	Jaspal Rana	Sports	Delhi
2002	Gullapalli Nageswara Rao	Medicine	Andhra Pradesh
2002	I. V. Subba Rao	Science & Engineering	Andhra Pradesh
2002	Turlapaty Kutumba Rao	Literature & Education	Andhra Pradesh
2002	Mani Ratnam	Arts	Tamil Nadu
2002	D. Nageshwar Reddy	Medicine	Andhra Pradesh
2002	Kiran Segal	Arts	Delhi
2002	Navaneetham Padmanabha Seshadri	Arts	Delhi
2002	Prahlad Kumar Sethi	Medicine	Delhi
2002	Virendra Kumar Sharma	Science & Engineering	Maharashtra
2002	B. N. Suresh	Science & Engineering	Kerala
2002	Phillips Talbot	Public Affairs	–
2002	Saroja Vaidyanathan	Arts	Delhi
2002	Dimitris C. Velissaropoulos	Literature & Education	– (Note: Indicates a citizen of Greece)
2002	T. H. Vinayakram	Arts	Tamil Nadu
2002	Kim Yang-shik	Literature & Education	– (Note: Indicates a citizen of South Korea)
2003	Manzoor Ahtesham	Literature & Education	Madhya Pradesh
2003	Ram Gopal Bajaj	Arts	Andhra Pradesh
2003	Asok Kumar Barua	Science & Engineering	West Bengal
2003	Jahnu Barua	Arts	Assam
2003	Shivram Bhoje	Science & Engineering	Maharashtra
2003	Jagdish Chaturvedi	Literature & Education	Delhi
2003	Jai Bhagwan Chaudhary	Science & Engineering	Haryana
2003	Nalli Kuppuswami Chetti	Trade & Industry	Tamil Nadu
2003	Danny Denzongpa	Arts	Maharashtra
2003	Kshetrimayum Ongbi Thouranisabi Devi	Arts	Manipur
2003	Francis Dore	Public Affairs	– (Note: Indicates a citizen of France)
2003	Rita Ganguly	Arts	Delhi
2003	Ranjana Gauhar	Arts	Delhi
2003	Sadashiv Vasantrao Gorakshkar	Arts	Maharashtra
2003	J. S. Guleria	Medicine	Delhi
2003	Rakhee Gulzar	Arts	Maharashtra
2003	Verna Elizabeth Watre Ingty	Social Work	Meghalaya
2003	Pratapsinh Jadhav	Others	Maharashtra
2003	Nemi Chandra Jain	Arts	Delhi
2003	O. P. Jain	Arts	Delhi
2003	Motilal Jotwani	Literature & Education	Delhi
2003	Sarvagya Singh Katiyar	Science & Engineering	Uttar Pradesh
2003	Vadiraj Raghavendra Katti	Science & Engineering	Karnataka
2003	Aamir Khan	Arts	Maharashtra
2003	Shafaat Ahmed Khan	Arts	Delhi
2003	Narayana Panicker Kochupillai	Medicine	Delhi
2003	Rajagopalan Krishnan	Medicine	Kerala
2003	Mukesh Kumar	Sports	Andhra Pradesh
2003	Chawngthu Lalhmingliana	Social Work	Mizoram
2003	N. R. Madhava Menon	Public Affairs	West Bengal
2003	Gyan Chandra Mishra	Science & Engineering	Maharashtra
2003	Gopal Chandra Mitra	Science & Engineering	Odisha
2003	Jai Pal Mittal	Science & Engineering	Maharashtra
2003	Manthiram Natarajan	Science & Engineering	Delhi
2003	Nokdenlemba	Literature & Education	Nagaland
2003	Gopal Purushottam Phadke	Sports	Maharashtra
2003	Kanhaya Lal Pokhriyal	Sports	Uttarakhand
2003	Yarlagadda Lakshmi Prasad	Literature & Education	Andhra Pradesh
2003	Sundaram Ramakrishnan	Science & Engineering	Kerala
2003	Malavika Sarukkai	Arts	Tamil Nadu
2003	Ashok Seth	Medicine	Delhi
2003	Tekkatte Narayan Shanbhag	Literature & Education	Maharashtra
2003	Baburao Govindrao Shirke	Science & Engineering	Maharashtra
2003	Shailendra Nath Shrivastava	Literature & Education	Bihar
2003	Jyotirmoyee Sikdar	Sports	West Bengal
2003	Pritam Singh	Literature & Education	Uttar Pradesh
2003	Vijay Prakash Singh	Medicine	Bihar
2003	Mahendra Singh Sodha	Science & Engineering	Uttar Pradesh
2003	T. M. Soundararajan	Arts	Tamil Nadu
2003	Sukumari	Arts	Tamil Nadu
2003	Vairamuthu	Literature & Education	Tamil Nadu
2003	Nagarajan Vedachalam	Science & Engineering	Kerala
2003	Srinivasaraghavan Venkataraghavan	Sports	Tamil Nadu
2003	Satish Vyas	Arts	Maharashtra
2003	Kishorebhai Ratilal Zaveri	Social Work	Delhi
2004	Meher Jehangir Banaji	Social Work	Maharashtra
2004	Hamlet Bareh	Literature & Education	Meghalaya
2004	K. M. Beenamol	Sports	Kerala
2004	Bharathiraja	Arts	Tamil Nadu
2004	Arun Trimbak Dabke	Medicine	Chhattisgarh
2004	Sharayu Daftary	Trade & Industry	Maharashtra
2004	Maguni Charan Das	Arts	Odisha
2004	Manoranjan Das	Arts	Odisha
2004	Damodar Keshav Datar	Arts	Maharashtra
2004	Kumarpal Desai	Literature & Education	Gujarat
2004	Gurmayum Anita Devi	Sports	Manipur
2004	Nampally Divakar	Science & Engineering	Andhra Pradesh
2004	Rahul Dravid	Sports	Karnataka
2004	Tatyana Elizarenkova	Literature & Education	–
2004	Sourav Ganguly	Sports	West Bengal
2004	Anju Bobby George	Sports	Kerala
2004	Kadri Gopalnath	Arts	Karnataka
2004	Anil Kumar Gupta	Literature & Education	Gujarat
2004	Sharad Moreshwar Hardikar	Medicine	Maharashtra
2004	Hariharan	Arts	Maharashtra
2004	Syed Shah Mohammed Hussaini	Literature & Education	Karnataka
2004	Gowri Ishwaran	Literature & Education	Delhi
2004	Leeladhar Jagudi	Literature & Education	Uttarakhand
2004	Sunita Jain	Literature & Education	Delhi
2004	Purshottam Das Jalota	Arts	Maharashtra
2004	Krishn Kanhai	Arts	Uttar Pradesh
2004	Heisnam Kanhailal	Arts	Manipur
2004	Prithvi Nath Kaula	Literature & Education	Uttar Pradesh
2004	Satish Kumar Kaura	Science & Engineering	Delhi
2004	Anupam Kher	Arts	Maharashtra
2004	Sikkil Venkatraman Kunjumani	Arts	Tamil Nadu
2004	Flora MacDonald	Public Affairs	– (Note: Indicates a citizen of Canada)
2004	S. C. Manchanda	Medicine	Delhi
2004	Ashwin Balachand Mehta	Medicine	Maharashtra
2004	Siddhartha Mehta	Medicine	Delhi
2004	Nalini Ranjan Mohanty	Science & Engineering	Karnataka
2004	Batchu Lutchmiah Srinivasa Murthy	Social Work	Karnataka
2004	Keezhpadam Kumaran Nair	Arts	Kerala
2004	Morup Namgyal	Arts	Jammu & Kashmir
2004	Sikkil Natesan Neela	Arts	Tamil Nadu
2004	Aubakir Dastanuly Nilibayev	Literature & Education	– (Note: Indicates a citizen of Kazakhstan)
2004	S. P. Nimbalkar	Sports	Maharashtra
2004	Haridwaramangalam A. K. Palanivel	Arts	Tamil Nadu
2004	Shyam Narain Panday	Literature & Education	Uttar Pradesh
2004	Ayyappa Paniker	Literature & Education	Kerala
2004	P. Parameswaran	Literature & Education	Kerala
2004	Kantibhai Baldevbhai Patel	Arts	Gujarat
2004	Samuel Paul	Literature & Education	Karnataka
2004	T. S. Prahlad	Science & Engineering	Karnataka
2004	Vishweshwaraiah Prakash	Science & Engineering	Karnataka
2004	Premlata Puri	Literature & Education	Delhi
2004	Sudha Ragunathan	Arts	Tamil Nadu
2004	Veernala Jayarama Rao	Arts	Delhi
2004	Queenie Rynjah	Social Work	Meghalaya
2004	S. K. Sama	Medicine	Delhi
2004	Bal Samant	Literature & Education	Maharashtra
2004	Rajan Saxena	Medicine	Uttar Pradesh
2004	Kanhaiyalal Sethia	Literature & Education	Rajasthan
2004	Ramesh Chandra Shah	Literature & Education	Madhya Pradesh
2004	K. N. Shankara	Science & Engineering	Gujarat
2004	Devi Shetty	Medicine	Karnataka
2004	Bharati Shivaji	Arts	Delhi
2004	Lalji Singh	Science & Engineering	Andhra Pradesh
2004	Pandit Surinder Singh	Arts	Delhi
2004	Gopal Prasad Sinha	Medicine	Bihar
2004	Rajpal Singh Sirohi	Science & Engineering	Delhi
2004	Bhajan Sopori	Arts	Delhi
2004	Heinrich von Stietencron	Literature & Education	Germany
2004	Sudhir Tailang	Literature & Education	Delhi
2004	Dilip Tirkey	Sports	Odisha
2004	Dalip Kaur Tiwana	Literature & Education	Punjab
2004	Neyyattinkara Vasudevan	Arts	Kerala
2004	M. Vijayan	Science & Engineering	Karnataka
2004	Asifa Zamani	Literature & Education	Uttar Pradesh
2005	Muzaffar Ali	Arts	Delhi
2005	Shameem Dev Azad	Arts	Delhi
2005	Amiya Kumar Bagchi	Literature & Education	West Bengal
2005	G. Bakthavathsalam	Medicine	Tamil Nadu
2005	Dipankar Banerjee	Science & Engineering	Delhi
2005	Srikumar Banerjee	Science & Engineering	Maharashtra
2005	Hema Bharali	Social Work	Assam
2005	Shobhana Bhartia	Literature & Education	Delhi
2005	M. Boyer	Arts	Goa
2005	Manas Chaudhuri	Literature & Education	Meghalaya
2005	K. S. Chithra	Arts	Kerala
2005	Banwari Lal Chouksey	Science & Engineering	Madhya Pradesh
2005	Nana Chudasama	Social Work	Maharashtra
2005	Darchhawna	Literature & Education	Mizoram
2005	Bhagavatula Dattaguru	Science & Engineering	Karnataka
2005	Yumlembam Gambhini Devi	Arts	Manipur
2005	Vasudevan Gnana Gandhi	Science & Engineering	Kerala
2005	Pullela Gopichand	Sports	Andhra Pradesh
2005	J. S. Grewal	Literature & Education	Chandigarh
2005	Jitendra Mohan Hans	Medicine	Delhi
2005	Indira Jaising	Public Affairs	Delhi
2005	Amin Kamil	Literature & Education	Jammu & Kashmir
2005	Madhu Sudan Kanungo	Science & Engineering	Uttar Pradesh
2005	Shahrukh Khan	Arts	Maharashtra
2005	Ghulam Sadiq Khan	Arts	Delhi
2005	Kavita Krishnamurthy	Arts	Karnataka
2005	Anil Kumble	Sports	Karnataka
2005	P. N. V. Kurup	Medicine	Delhi
2005	Lalsawma	Social Work	Mizoram
2005	Gadul Singh Lama	Literature & Education	Sikkim
2005	M. Mahadevappa	Science & Engineering	Karnataka
2005	Mammen Mathew	Literature & Education	Kerala
2005	Chaturbhuj Meher	Arts	Odisha
2005	Veer Singh Mehta	Medicine	Delhi
2005	Kumkum Mohanty	Arts	Odisha
2005	S. B. Mujumdar	Literature & Education	Maharashtra
2005	Sunita Narain	Others	Delhi
2005	Lavu Narendranath	Medicine	Andhra Pradesh
2005	Punaram Nishad	Arts	Chhattisgarh
2005	Mehrunnisa Parvez	Literature & Education	Madhya Pradesh
2005	Theilin Phanbuh	Social Work	Meghalaya
2005	Cyrus S. Poonawalla	Medicine	Maharashtra
2005	Gurbachan Singh Randhawa	Sports	Delhi
2005	Rajyavardhan Singh Rathore	Sports	Rajasthan
2005	K. C. Reddy	Science & Engineering	Karnataka
2005	Sushil Sahai	Science & Engineering	Uttar Pradesh
2005	Kedar Nath Sahoo	Arts	Jharkhand
2005	Raasacha Swami Ram Swaroop Sharma	Arts	Uttar Pradesh
2005	Sougaijam Thanil Singh	Arts	Manipur
2005	Gladys Staines	Social Work	– (Note: Indicates a citizen of Australia)
2005	Rachel Thomas	Sports	Delhi
2005	Kunnakudi Vaidyanathan	Arts	Tamil Nadu
2005	Komala Varadan	Arts	Delhi
2005	Bilat Paswan Vihangam	Literature & Education	Bihar
2005	Puran Chand Wadali	Arts	Punjab
2006	Suwalal Chhaganmal Bafna	Social Work	Maharashtra
2006	Sanjeev Bagai	Medicine	Delhi
2006	Ramachandran Balasubramanian	Science & Engineering	Tamil Nadu
2006	P. S. Bedi	Social Work	Delhi
2006	Madhumita Bisht	Sports	Delhi
2006	J. N. Chaudhry	Civil Service	Delhi
2006	Devappagowda Chinnaiah	Medicine	Karnataka
2006	Ileana Citaristi	Arts	Odisha
2006	Ajeet Cour	Literature & Education	Delhi
2006	Sucheta Dalal	Literature & Education	Maharashtra
2006	Mehmood Dhaulpuri	Arts	Delhi
2006	Mohan Singh Gunjyal	Sports	Arunachal Pradesh
2006	Harsh Gupta	Science & Engineering	Andhra Pradesh
2006	Swami Harigovind	Arts	Uttar Pradesh
2006	Seyed E. Hasnain	Science & Engineering	Andhra Pradesh
2006	Shahnaz Husain	Trade & Industry	Delhi
2006	Anil Prakash Joshi	Social Work	Uttarakhand
2006	Shree Lal Joshi	Arts	Rajasthan
2006	Mohan Kameswaran	Medicine	Tamil Nadu
2006	Upendra Kaul	Medicine	Delhi
2006	Surinder Kaur	Arts	Haryana
2006	Rashid Khan	Arts	West Bengal
2006	Laltluangliana Khiangte	Literature & Education	Mizoram
2006	Mary Kom	Sports	Manipur
2006	Vasundhara Komkali	Arts	Madhya Pradesh
2006	Suresh Krishna	Trade & Industry	Tamil Nadu
2006	Narendra Kumar	Science & Engineering	Karnataka
2006	Tsering Landol	Medicine	Jammu & Kashmir
2006	Lothar Lutze	Literature & Education	Germany
2006	Abdul Rahman Al Mahmoud	Public Affairs	Qatar
2006	Yashodhar Mathpal	Arts	Uttarakhand
2006	Sania Mirza	Sports	Andhra Pradesh
2006	Ghanashyam Mishra	Medicine	Odisha
2006	Madhup Mudgal	Arts	Delhi
2006	Sudha Murty	Social Work	Karnataka
2006	B. V. Nimbkar	Science & Engineering	Maharashtra
2006	B. Palaniappan	Medicine	Tamil Nadu
2006	Mrinal Pande	Literature & Education	Delhi
2006	Kavungal Chathunni Panicker	Arts	Kerala
2006	Shyama Charan Pati	Arts	Jharkhand
2006	Hakim Syed Zillur Rahman	Medicine	Uttar Pradesh
2006	Harbhajan Singh Rissam	Medicine	Delhi
2006	Rajendra Kumar Saboo	Social Work	Chandigarh
2006	Bahadur Singh Sagoo	Sports	Punjab
2006	Gayatri Sankaran	Arts	Tamil Nadu
2006	Prasad Sawkar	Arts	Goa
2006	Kamal Kumar Sethi	Medicine	Delhi
2006	Mehmooda Ali Shah	Literature & Education	Jammu & Kashmir
2006	Aribam Syam Sharma	Arts	Manipur
2006	Shobana	Arts	Kerala
2006	Swaminathan Sivaram	Science & Engineering	Maharashtra
2006	Kanaka Srinivasan	Arts	Delhi
2006	Sugathakumari	Literature & Education	Kerala
2006	Pankaj Udhas	Arts	Maharashtra
2006	Tehemton Erach Udwadia	Medicine	Maharashtra
2006	Sudha Varghese	Social Work	Bihar
2006	Melhupra Vero	Social Work	Nagaland
2006	Sitanshu Yashaschandra	Literature & Education	Gujarat
2006	Fatima Zakaria	Literature & Education	Maharashtra
2006	Kashmiri Lal Zakir	Literature & Education	Chandigarh
2007	Rabinder Gokaldas Ahuja	Others	Maharashtra
2007	Thekkethil Kochandy Alex	Science & Engineering	Karnataka
2007	Temsula Ao	Literature & Education	Assam
2007	Mohan Babu	Arts	Andhra Pradesh
2007	Runa Banerjee	Social Work	Uttar Pradesh
2007	Rabi Narayan Bastia	Science & Engineering	Maharashtra
2007	Dilip K. Biswas	Science & Engineering	Delhi
2007	Ananda Mohan Chakrabarty	Science & Engineering	–
2007	Geeta Chandran	Arts	Delhi
2007	Harpinder Singh Chawla	Medicine	Chandigarh
2007	Sister M. Cyril Mooney	Social Work	– (Note: Indicates a citizen of Ireland)
2007	Tarla Dalal	Others	Maharashtra
2007	Ravindra Dayal	Literature & Education	Delhi
2007	Astad Deboo	Arts	Maharashtra
2007	Vijaydan Detha	Literature & Education	Rajasthan
2007	Neelamani Devi	Arts	Manipur
2007	Bakul Harshadrai Dholakia	Literature & Education	Gujarat
2007	Remo Fernandes	Arts	Goa
2007	Amitav Ghosh	Literature & Education	–
2007	Meenakshi Gopinath	Literature & Education	Delhi
2007	P. Gopinathan	Arts	Kerala
2007	Narmada Prasad Gupta	Medicine	Delhi
2007	Rajinder Gupta	Trade & Industry	Punjab
2007	Sushil Gupta	Social Work	Delhi
2007	Syeda Saiyidain Hameed	Public Affairs	Delhi
2007	Pushpa Hans	Arts	Delhi
2007	Mushirul Hasan	Literature & Education	Delhi
2007	Ashok Kumar Hemal	Medicine	Delhi
2007	Shanti Hiranand	Arts	Delhi
2007	Mujtaba Hussain	Literature & Education	Andhra Pradesh
2007	Ananda Shankar Jayant	Arts	Andhra Pradesh
2007	Kiran Karnik	Science & Engineering	Delhi
2007	Naina Lal Kidwai	Trade & Industry	Maharashtra
2007	Giriraj Kishore	Literature & Education	Uttar Pradesh
2007	Humpy Koneru	Sports	Andhra Pradesh
2007	Atul Kumar	Medicine	Delhi
2007	Govardan Kumari	Arts	Gujarat
2007	Sonam Tshering Lepcha	Arts	Sikkim
2007	C. N. Manjunath	Medicine	Karnataka
2007	Balachandra Menon	Arts	Kerala
2007	Adya Prasad Mishra	Literature & Education	Uttar Pradesh
2007	Anoop Misra	Medicine	Delhi
2007	P. Namperumalsamy	Medicine	Tamil Nadu
2007	Mayilvahanan Natarajan	Medicine	Tamil Nadu
2007	Thanu Padmanabhan	Science & Engineering	Maharashtra
2007	K. R. Palaniswamy	Medicine	Tamil Nadu
2007	Lalit Pande	Others	Uttarakhand
2007	Mahadev Prasad Pandey	Literature & Education	Chhattisgarh
2007	Shekhar Pathak	Literature & Education	Uttarakhand
2007	Yusufkhan Mohamadkhan Pathan	Literature & Education	Maharashtra
2007	Lama Thup Phuntsok	Social Work	Arunachal Pradesh
2007	S. Dhakshinamurthy Pillai	Arts	Tamil Nadu
2007	Devindra Rahinwal#	Social Work	Uttarakhand
2007	Baldev Raj	Science & Engineering	Tamil Nadu
2007	Pratibha Ray	Literature & Education	Odisha
2007	Rostislav Rybakov	Literature & Education	–
2007	Mahipal S. Sachdev	Medicine	Delhi
2007	Mira Salganik	Literature & Education	–
2007	Teesta Setalvad	Public Affairs	Maharashtra
2007	Vikram Seth	Literature & Education	–
2007	Shashikala	Arts	Maharashtra
2007	Balbir Singh	Medicine	Delhi
2007	Gajendra Narayan Singh	Arts	Bihar
2007	Jeev Milkha Singh	Sports	Punjab
2007	Thingbaijam Babu Singh	Arts	Manipur
2007	A. Sivasailam	Trade & Industry	Tamil Nadu
2007	Sonam Skalzang	Arts	Jammu & Kashmir
2007	Sudhir Kumar Sopory	Science & Engineering	Haryana
2007	Pannuru Sripathy	Arts	Andhra Pradesh
2007	Valayapatti A. R. Subramaniam	Arts	Tamil Nadu
2007	Waman Thakre	Arts	Madhya Pradesh
2007	B. Paul Thaliath	Medicine	Uttar Pradesh
2007	P. R. Thilagam	Arts	Tamil Nadu
2007	Sheo Bhagwan Tibrewal	Medicine	–
2007	Vaali	Literature & Education	Tamil Nadu
2007	Kharag Singh Valdiya	Science & Engineering	Karnataka
2007	Mohsin Wali	Medicine	Delhi
2007	Khalid Zaheer	Social Work	Uttarakhand
2008	Sivanthi Adithan	Literature & Education	Tamil Nadu
2008	Bina Agarwal	Literature & Education	Delhi
2008	Kailash Chandra Agrawal	Social Work	Rajasthan
2008	K. S. Nissar Ahmed	Literature & Education	Karnataka
2008	M. A. Yousuf Ali	Social Work	– (Note: Indicates a citizen of the United Arab Emirates)
2008	Tom Alter	Arts	Maharashtra
2008	Vellayani Arjunan	Literature & Education	Kerala
2008	Shyam Narayan Arya	Medicine	Bihar
2008	Nirupam Bajpai	Literature & Education	–
2008	Dinesh K. Bhargava	Medicine	Delhi
2008	Baichung Bhutia	Sports	Sikkim
2008	Sheela Borthakur	Social Work	Assam
2008	Karuna Mary Braganza	Social Work	Maharashtra
2008	Moozhikkulam Kochukuttan Chakyar	Arts	Kerala
2008	Jonnalagadda Gurappa Chetty	Arts	Andhra Pradesh
2008	Meenakshi Chitharanjan	Arts	Tamil Nadu
2008	Kasturi Lal Chopra	Science & Engineering	Delhi
2008	Bula Choudhury	Sports	West Bengal
2008	Madhuri Dixit	Arts	Maharashtra
2008	Vinod Dua	Literature & Education	Delhi
2008	Barkha Dutt	Literature & Education	Delhi
2008	Tony Fernandez	Medicine	Kerala
2008	Kekoo Gandhy	Arts	Maharashtra
2008	Helen Giri	Arts	Meghalaya
2008	Jatin Goswami	Arts	Assam
2008	V. R. Gowrishankar	Social Work	Karnataka
2008	Hans Raj Hans	Arts	Punjab
2008	Surjya Kanta Hazarika	Literature & Education	Assam
2008	Sabitri Heisnam	Arts	Manipur
2008	Joseph H. Hulse	Science & Engineering	–
2008	Bhavarlal Jain	Science & Engineering	Maharashtra
2008	Rakesh Kumar Jain	Medicine	Uttarakhand
2008	Raman Kapur	Medicine	Delhi
2008	Kaleem Ullah Khan	Science & Engineering	Uttar Pradesh
2008	T. P. Lahane	Medicine	Maharashtra
2008	M. Leelavathy	Literature & Education	Kerala
2008	Gokulotsavji Maharaj	Arts	Madhya Pradesh
2008	Colette Mathur	Public Affairs	– (Note: Indicates a citizen of Switzerland)
2008	Amitabh Mattoo	Literature & Education	Jammu & Kashmir
2008	Keiki R. Mehta	Medicine	Maharashtra
2008	Kshama Metre	Social Work	Himachal Pradesh
2008	Amit Mitra	Trade & Industry	Delhi
2008	Mangala Prasad Mohanty	Arts	Jharkhand
2008	P. K. Narayanan Nambiar	Arts	Kerala
2008	John Martin Nelson	Arts	Chhattisgarh
2008	M. C. Pant	Medicine	Uttar Pradesh
2008	Bholabhai Patel	Literature & Education	Gujarat
2008	Pratap Pawar	Arts	–
2008	Gennadi Mikhailovich Pechinkov	Arts	–
2008	Gangadhar Pradhan	Arts	Odisha
2008	Arjunan Rajasekaran	Medicine	Tamil Nadu
2008	Kutikuppala Surya Rao	Social Work	Andhra Pradesh
2008	Yella Venkateswara Rao	Arts	Andhra Pradesh
2008	Madan Mohan Sabharwal	Social Work	Delhi
2008	Malvika Sabharwal	Medicine	Delhi
2008	Vikramjit Sahney	Social Work	Delhi
2008	Rajdeep Sardesai	Literature & Education	Delhi
2008	Deepak Sehgal	Medicine	Delhi
2008	M. Night Shyamalan	Arts	–
2008	A. Jayanta Kumar Singh	Medicine	Manipur
2008	Indu Bhushan Sinha	Medicine	Bihar
2008	Sirkazhi G. Sivachidambaram	Arts	Tamil Nadu
2008	Randhir Sud	Medicine	Delhi
2008	Mohammad Yousuf Taing	Literature & Education	Jammu & Kashmir
2008	Sukhadeo Thorat	Literature & Education	Delhi
2008	Srinibash Udgata	Literature & Education	Odisha
2008	C. U. Velmurugendran	Medicine	Tamil Nadu
2008	Sant Singh Virmani	Science & Engineering	–
2008	Jawahar Wattal	Arts	Delhi
2008	Surendra Singh Yadav	Medicine	Delhi
2008	Sentila T. Yanger	Arts	Nagaland
2009	Pankaj Arjan Advani	Sports	Karnataka
2009	Ameena Ahmad Ahuja	Arts	Delhi
2009	Tafazzul Ali (Note: Tafazzul Ali died in 2008.)#	Arts	Assam
2009	Suresh Gundu Amonkar	Literature & Education	Goa
2009	Aishwarya Rai Bachchan	Arts	Maharashtra
2009	Kalyan Banerjee	Medicine	Delhi
2009	Utpal K. Banerjee	Literature & Education	Delhi
2009	Hemi Bawa	Arts	Delhi
2009	Brahmanandam	Arts	Andhra Pradesh
2009	Abhay Chhajlani	Literature & Education	Madhya Pradesh
2009	Ram Kishore Chhipa	Arts	Rajasthan
2009	Balswarup Choubey	Medicine	Maharashtra
2009	Syamal Bhushan Ghosh Dastidar	Civil Service	Haryana
2009	Birendra Nath Datta	Literature & Education	Assam
2009	Shashi Deshpande	Literature & Education	Karnataka
2009	Devayani	Arts	–
2009	Mahendra Singh Dhoni	Sports	Jharkhand
2009	Prakash N. Dubey	Arts	Maharashtra
2009	Suresh Dutta	Arts	West Bengal
2009	Shamsur Rahman Faruqi	Literature & Education	Uttar Pradesh
2009	Kalamandalam Gopi	Arts	Kerala
2009	Niranjan Goswami	Arts	West Bengal
2009	Saibaba Goud	Medicine	Andhra Pradesh
2009	Bannanje Govindacharya	Literature & Education	Karnataka
2009	Ashok Kumar Grover	Medicine	Delhi
2009	Yash Gulati	Medicine	Delhi
2009	A. K. Gupta	Medicine	Maharashtra
2009	Syed Iqbal Hasnain	Others	Delhi
2009	Panchapakesa Jayaraman	Literature & Education	–
2009	Geeta Kapur	Arts	Delhi
2009	Nirmal Singh Khalsa	Arts	Punjab
2009	Hashmat Ullah Khan	Arts	Jammu & Kashmir
2009	Helen	Arts	Maharashtra
2009	Mathoor Krishnamurty	Literature & Education	Karnataka
2009	S. Krishnaswamy	Arts	Tamil Nadu
2009	Balbir Singh Kullar	Sports	Punjab
2009	Akshay Kumar	Arts	Maharashtra
2009	P. R. Krishna Kumar	Medicine	Tamil Nadu
2009	R. K. Krishna Kumar	Trade & Industry	Maharashtra
2009	Arvind Lal	Medicine	Delhi
2009	Bilkees I. Latif	Social Work	Andhra Pradesh
2009	Keepu Tsering Lepcha	Social Work	Sikkim
2009	Iravatham Mahadevan	Arts	Tamil Nadu
2009	Jayanta Mahapatra	Literature & Education	Odisha
2009	Shyam Sunder Maheshwari	Social Work	Rajasthan
2009	Laxman Mane	Literature & Education	Maharashtra
2009	Hridaynath Mangeshkar	Arts	Maharashtra
2009	John Ralston Marr	Literature & Education	–
2009	Penaz Masani	Arts	Maharashtra
2009	Alok Mehta	Literature & Education	Delhi
2009	Surinder Mehta	Others	Delhi
2009	Cheril Krishna Menon	Social Work	–
2009	Shaoli Mitra	Arts	West Bengal
2009	Udit Narayan	Arts	Maharashtra
2009	Govind Ram Nirmalkar	Arts	Chhattisgarh
2009	Shaik Khader Noordeen	Medicine	Tamil Nadu
2009	Leela Omchery	Arts	Delhi
2009	Pratapaditya Pal	Arts	–
2009	Shyamala Pappu	Public Affairs	Delhi
2009	Joseph H. Pereira	Social Work	Maharashtra
2009	D. S. Rana	Medicine	Himachal Pradesh
2009	Bansilal Rathi	Social Work	Madhya Pradesh
2009	A. Sankara Reddy	Literature & Education	Delhi
2009	Sunil Kanti Roy	Social Work	West Bengal
2009	Thanikachalam Sadagopan	Medicine	Tamil Nadu
2009	Lalthangfala Sailo	Literature & Education	Mizoram
2009	Aruna Sairam	Arts	Tamil Nadu
2009	Arunmugam Sakthivel	Trade & Industry	Tamil Nadu
2009	Ngawang Samten	Literature & Education	Uttar Pradesh
2009	K. Asungba Sangtam	Public Affairs	Nagaland
2009	Mattannoor Sankarankutty	Arts	Kerala
2009	Kumar Sanu	Arts	Maharashtra
2009	Ameen Sayani	Others	Maharashtra
2009	Kiran Seth	Arts	Delhi
2009	Gurumayum Gourakishor Sharma	Arts	Manipur
2009	B. R. Shetty	Trade & Industry	–
2009	Ravindra Nath Shrivastava	Literature & Education	Bihar
2009	Harbhajan Singh	Sports	Punjab
2009	R. Sivaraman	Medicine	Kerala
2009	Ranbir Chander Sobti	Literature & Education	Chandigarh
2009	Skendrowell Syiemlieh (Note: Skendrowell Syiemlieh died in 2008.)#	Arts	Meghalaya
2009	Pramod Tandon	Science & Engineering	Meghalaya
2009	J. A. K. Tareen	Literature & Education	Puducherry
2009	Thilakan	Arts	Kerala
2009	Ram Shankar Tripathi	Literature & Education	Uttar Pradesh
2009	Norden Tshering	Literature & Education	Sikkim
2009	K. P. Udayabhanu	Arts	Kerala
2009	Ashok K. Vaid	Medicine	Delhi
2009	Sunny Varkey	Literature & Education	–
2009	Govindan Vijayaraghavan	Medicine	Kerala
2009	Mitraniketan Viswanathan	Social Work	Kerala
2009	Vivek	Arts	Tamil Nadu
2009	Goriparthi Narasimha Raju Yadav	Science & Engineering	Andhra Pradesh

== Explanatory notes ==
Non-citizen recipients

Posthumous recipients
