= Nowshir Kaikobad Jungalwalla =

Indian public health official and medical professional (1912-1995)

Director of the Health Unit, WHO
- In office 1967–1974

Additional Director-General of Health Services, Government of India
- In office 1965–1967

Deputy Director-General of Health Services, Government of India
- In office 1963–1965

Director of the All India Institute of Hygiene and Public Health
- In office 1957–1960

Personal details
- Born: 1 December 1912; Rangoon, Burma (now Myanmar)
- Died: 8 May 1995 (aged 82); Ealing, England
- Spouse: Piloo Nanvutty (m. 1950)
- Children: Honshang Jungalwalla (son)
- Education: Rangoon University, Johns Hopkins University
- Profession: Public health official, Medical professional
- Awards: Officer of the Order of the British Empire in 1946; Fellow of the National Academy of Medical Sciences (India) in 1965; Fellow of the Royal College of Physicians in 1977; Honorary Fellow, American Public Health Association

Nowshir Kaikobad Jungalwalla (1 December 1912 – 8 May 1995) was an Indian public health official and medical professional who held key positions in the Indian Medical Service and the World Health Organization.

== Early life and education ==
Jungalwalla was born on 1 December 1912 in Rangoon, Burma (then part of British India) to K. T. Jungalwalla and Freny Anklesaria. He graduated with an MBBS from Rangoon University in 1936 and earned his MRCP in 1937. Following World War II, he pursued a master’s degree in public health (MPH) at Johns Hopkins University in 1948.

== Career ==
Jungalwalla began his professional journey in 1939 when he joined the Indian Medical Service, where he served until 1946. During World War II, he specialised in venereal diseases and medicine, leading treatment centers in the Middle East and India. From 1946 to 1950, he worked as Deputy Public Health Commissioner in the Ministry of Health.

From 1950 to 1955, Jungalwalla worked with the World Health Organization. He served as a regional adviser for venereal diseases in the newly established South-East Asia Regional Office till 1952 and later became WHO’s first representative in Indonesia during the country’s early years of independence till 1955.

Returning to India in 1955, Jungalwalla joined the Indian public health service. Between 1957 and 1960, he served as the Director of the All India Institute of Hygiene and Public Health in Kolkata. During his tenure, he revitalised the Chetla Primary Health Programme, restarted kindergarten schools, and worked to improve rural sanitation and clean water access. He also reaffiliated the institute with Calcutta University and initiated joint academic programs.

In the early 1960s, Jungalwalla held several senior roles in Indian health services. From 1963 to 1965, he served as Deputy Director-General of Health Services, and from 1965 to 1967, he was promoted to Additional Director-General of Health Services. In 1967, Jungalwalla founded the National Institute of Health Education and Family Welfare (later renamed the National Institute of Health and Family Planning).

Jungalwalla chaired the Jungalwalla Committee, officially known as the "Committee on Integration of Health Services." Established in 1964 under his leadership, the committee was tasked with addressing issues related to the integration of health services, the abolition of private practice by government doctors, and the service conditions of medical professionals. The committee provided a clear definition of “integrated health services” and made recommendations to improve the healthcare delivery system.

Later that year, Jungalwalla returned to WHO for his second tenure, serving as Director of the Health Unit based in Geneva from 1967 to 1974. In this role, he worked on public health programs across Africa, South America, India, and the Middle East. Between 1972 and 1974, he served as WHO’s representative for India at the South-East Asia Regional Office in New Delhi. Jungalwalla retired from all public duties in 1980.

== Recognitions ==
Jungalwalla was honoured with:

- Officer of the Order of the British Empire (OBE) in 1946.
- Fellow of the National Academy of Medical Sciences (India) in 1965.
- Fellow of the Royal College of Physicians (FRCP) in 1977.
- Hero of Public Health by the Johns Hopkins University School of Hygiene and Public Health in 1992.
- Honorary Fellow, American Public Health Association.

== Personal life ==
Jungalwalla married Piloo Nanvutty in 1950, and the couple had one son, Honshang, who became a consultant psychiatrist in the NHS in England. Jungalwalla spent his later years in England, where he died on 8 May 1995 in Ealing after living with Alzheimer’s disease.
