= Tony Fernandez (disambiguation) =

Tony Fernandez (1962–2020) was a Dominican baseball player.

Tony Fernandez may also refer to:

- Tony Fernandez (musician) (born 1946), English drummer
- Tony Fernandez (ophthalmologist), Indian ophthalmologist

== See also ==
- Tony Fernandes (born 1964), Malaysian entrepreneur
- Tony Fernandes (politician), Indian politician
- Tony Fernandes (cricketer), Indian cricketer
