= Yumlembam =

Yumlembam is a Meitei family name. Notable people with the surname are:

- Yumlembam Gambhini Devi, Indian singer of Nata Sankirtana and dancer of Manipuri Raas
- Yumlembam Premi Devi, Indian women's international footballer
