= Sougaijam Thanil Singh =

Indian classical dancer

- Born: Manipur, India
- Occupation: Classical dancer
- Known for: Manipuri dance, Nata Sankirtana
- Parent: S. Ksher Singh
- Awards: Padma Shri; Manipuri State Kala Academy Award; Sangeet Natak Akademi Award; Baidya Ratna Award

Sougaijam Thanil Singh is an Indian classical dancer, known for his proficiency in the classical dance forms of Manipuri and Nata Sankirtana. Born to S. Ksher Singh, a Manipuri dancer, in the Northeast Indian state of Manipur, he received his early training from his father as well as Guru Tombi Sharma, Guru Bhaigchandra Singh and Guru Koireng Singh. Later, he studied Manipuri dance and Nata Sankirtana, under Maisnam Amubi Singh, renowned dancer and Padma Shri awardee, at the Jawaharlal Nehru Manipur Dance Academy, Imphal, securing a diploma and a post graduate diploma, respectively, in the disciplines.

Joining his alma mater as a member of faculty, he rose in ranks to become the Pradhan Guru and superannuated as the director of the institution. He has performed on many stages in India and abroad. He is a Fellow of the Ministry of Culture of the Government of India and a recipient of the 1980 Manipuri State Kala Academy Award. He received the Sangeet Natak Akademi Award in 1994, followed by Baidya Ratna Award of the Manipur Sahitya Parishad. The Government of India awarded him the fourth highest civilian honour of the Padma Shri, in 2005, for his contributions to Indian classical dance.

== See also ==
- Manipuri dance
- Maisnam Amubi Singh
