= Sadashiv Vasantrao Gorakshkar =

Indian writer (1933–2019)

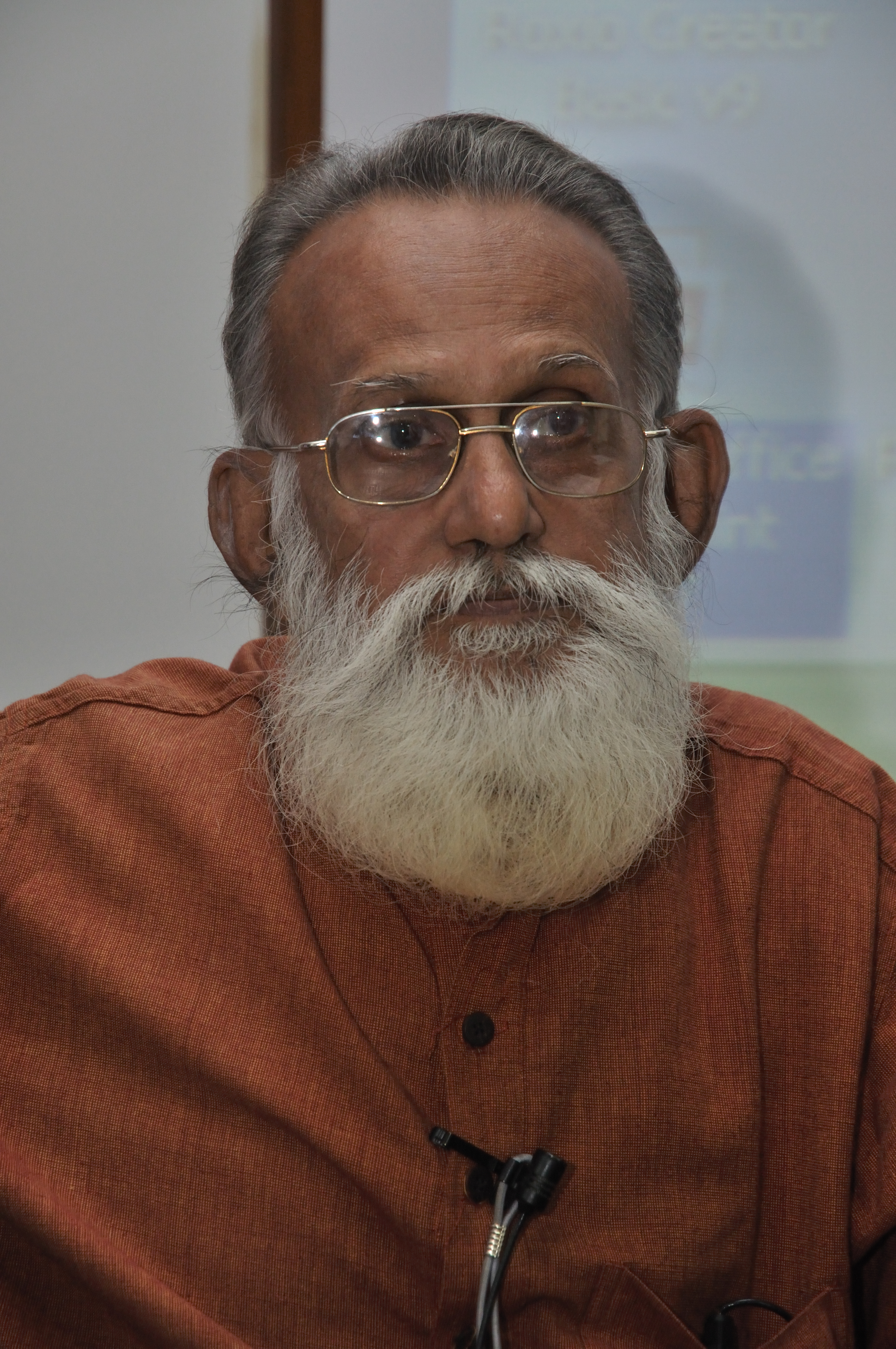
- Born: 31 May 1933; Maharashtra, India
- Died: 13 July 2019 (aged 86); Maharashtra, India
- Occupations: writer, historian, museologist and art critic
- Awards: Padma Shri (2003)

Sadashiv Vasantrao Gorakshkar (31 May 1933 – 13 July 2019) was an Indian writer, art critic, historian, museologist and a director of the Chhatrapati Shivaji Maharaj Vastu Sangrahalaya, erstwhile Prince of Wales Museum, Mumbai. He is credited with the restoration of Lakshmibai Pitre Kalasangrahalaya, a museum in Devrukh, Maharashtra to its present state.

== Birth ==
He was born on 31 May 1933 and brought up in the Indian state of Maharashtra.

== Works ==
Gorakshkar was the author of several books and articles such as:

- Raj Bhavans in Maharashtra
- Animal in Indian Art
- The Maritime Heritage of India
- Karle Caves of Western India.

== Awards ==
Gorakshkar was honoured by the Government of India in 2003 with Padma Shri, the fourth highest Indian civilian award.

== Death ==
He died on 13 July 2019 in Maharashtra and last rites were conducted in Vasind.

== See also ==
- Prince of Wales Museum
