= Syamal Bhushan Ghosh Dastidar =

Indian civil servant (born 1947)

S.B. Ghosh Dastidar
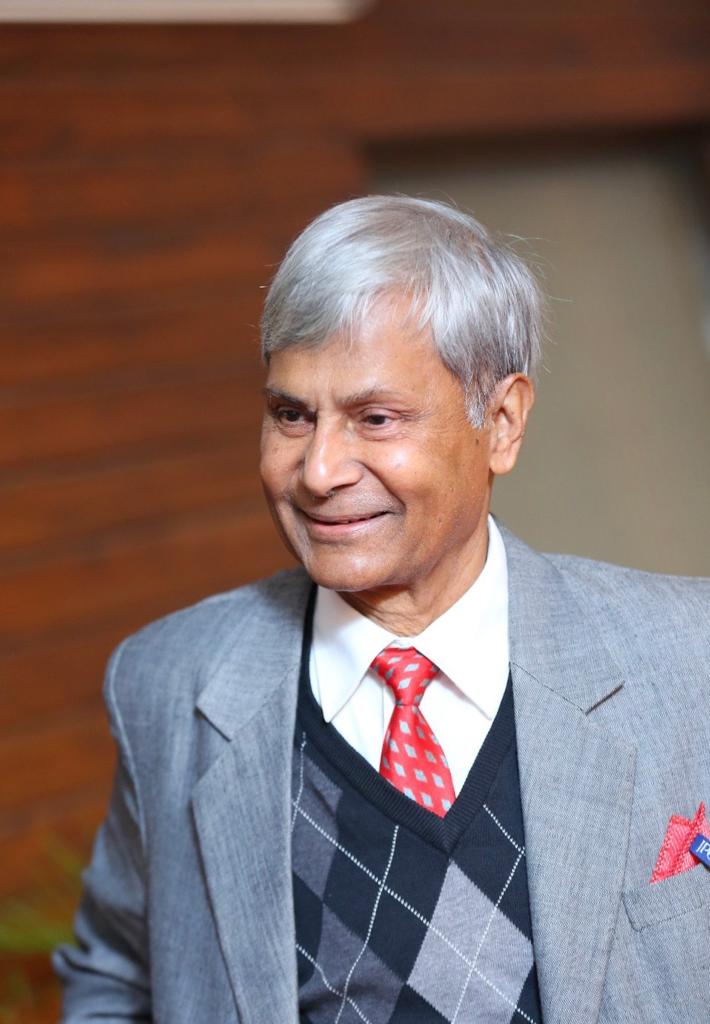
- Born: 1 April 1947 (age 79); Barisal District, Bengal
- Occupations: Civil servant, advisor to Gateway Rail Freight Ltd.
- Awards: Padma Shri

Syamal Bhushan Ghosh Dastidar is an ex-Indian civil servant, former Member Traffic of the Railway Board and Ex-Officio Secretary to the Government of India. In 2009, he was the only person to be awarded the Padma Shri, India's fourth highest civilian award, in the civil service category.

Ghosh Dastidar served as Vice Chairman of the Railway Claims Tribunal, New Delhi. He has also served in the Board of Directors of National Thermal Power Corporation of India and Bharat Coking Coal Limited. In addition, he is an advisor to Gateway Rail Freight Ltd, India's leading private container train operator.

== Early life and education ==
S.B. Ghosh Dastidar was born on 1 April 1947, in the Barisal district of British India to Haridas Ghosh Dastidar (father) and Amiyabala Ghosh Dastidar (mother). Ghosh Dastidar's family moved to Calcutta during the Partition of India. He completed his initial studies from Hooghly Collegiate School. Mr Ghosh Dastidar joined the Indian Railway Traffic Service in 1969 after completing his Bachelor of Engineering (Mechanical) from Calcutta University.

== Career ==
As Assistant Operating Superintendent, Sahibgunj, Ghosh Dastidar introduced a new system of clubbing wagon load consignments to trainload for a Single Destination which increased the productivity of wagons fourfold. In 1975, Ghosh Dastidar almost doubled the Freight loading of Barkakhana subdivision by revamping the coal pilot working of Patratu Coalfield. Later, as Senior Divisional Operating Manager of Dhanbad division, he introduced the concept of Pool Allotment in Patratu Coal Field. This improved the supply of coal to power houses by better line capacity utilization and reduced cost of transportation.

Ghosh Dastidar has also worked as Traffic Adviser to Aqaba Railway Corporation in Jordan where he was sent on deputation. He helped improve the freight loading of Aqaba Railways from 1.9 million tons per annum to 4 million tons per annum.

Later as Chief Operations Manager of South Central Railway he achieved 12% Compounded Annual Growth (C.A.G.) of freight loading compared to only 3% C.A.G of freight loading of Indian Railways. He also introduced running of Long Haul Trains up the world's steepest ghat (hill) section between Qulem and Castle Rock without using locotrol.

In Dec 2003, as Additional Member (Traffic) of the Railway Board, Shri S.B.Ghosh signed an agreement with his Pakistani counterpart to re-establish the second rail link between India and Pakistan after about 40 years. Following this, the Thar Express started its operations between Bhagat Ki Kothi (India) and Karachi Cantonment (Pakistan), on 18 February 2006 during his tenure as Member (Traffic).

In 2005, as General Manager of Central Railway, he restored the railway system in record time during the all-time high torrential rain and flood which paralyzed all systems in the city of Mumbai.

As Member Traffic, Railway Board and Ex-Officio Secretary to Government of India from July 2005 to March 2007, Ghosh Dastidar played a pivotal role in scripting the financial turnaround of Indian Railways which generated Rs. 14,453 crores in profit in 2006–07.

Ghosh helped to improve rail movement of 126 million tons in those two years that far exceeded the average growth of 10-11 million tons per year over the last 50 years. At the core of this new operational strategy was bringing about an increase in axel load of freight wagons.

With the help of Member Engineering, he modified and increased the height of "Standard Moving Dimensions". He redesigned the rolling stock to substantially increase the carrying capacities of the freight (particularly covered wagons) and passenger cars.

During his tenure as Member Traffic, Ghosh Dastidar conceived and developed the blueprint of the Dedicated Freight Corridor Project and initiated and led the development work of Western Dedicated Freight Corridor and Eastern Dedicated Freight Corridor.

He also introduced market-driven industry-specific dynamic pricing models and simplified commercial rules. In December 2006, Ghosh Dastidar also introduced ‘Zero Based Time Table’, which is the ‘bedrock’ of all future time tables.

Ghosh Dastidar is the main architect behind many projects in the Indian Railways, such as operation of airconditioned Garib Rath trains, privatization of container train operations, computerized self ticketing machines, dial 139, Internet ticketing system to name a few.

After retirement, Ghosh Dastidar served as Vice Chairman of Railway Claims Tribunal, New Delhi. In 2011, he was appointed as Independent Director for National Thermal Power Corporation of India and in 2012 he was appointed as Independent Director of Bharat Coking Coal Limited.

== Publications ==
- Terminals on Indian Railways, S. B. Ghosh Dastidar, Journal of Transport and Infrastructure, Volume 16, 2005, No 1

== Personal life ==
Ghosh Dastidar is married to Sreela Ghosh, also a civil servant (a recipient of the Presidential Award for Specially Distinguished Record of Service), who retired as Member, Central Board of Indirect Taxes and Customs and Special Secretary to Government of India.

== Awards ==
- Padma Shri (2009) for distinguished Civil Services
- Lifetime Achievement Award (2011) by National Academy of Indian Railways

== See also ==
- List of Padma Shri award recipients (2000–2009)
- Indian Railway Traffic Service
- Dedicated Freight Corridor
- Thar Express
- Garib Rath
