= Prakash Nanalal Kothari =

Indian medical doctor

- Born: Mumbai, Maharashtra, India
- Known for: Sexology
- Awards: Padma Shri; WAS Man of the Year

Prakash Nanalal Kothari is an Indian medical doctor and the Head of the Department of Sexual Medicine at the King Edward Memorial Hospital and Seth Gordhandas Sunderdas Medical College, Mumbai. A graduate of the Mumbai University, Kothari is credited with several books and articles on sexology. The World Association of Sexology (WAS) selected him as the Man of the Year in 1989. He was honored by the Government of India, in 2002, with the fourth highest Indian civilian award of Padma Shri. He has also collaborated with a condom brand from India to spread the awareness about sexual health and well-being.

== See also ==
- Sexology
