= Vachnesh Tripathi =

Indian writer, journalist (born 1920)

- Born: India
- Occupation(s): Writer, journalist
- Awards: Padma Shri

Vachnesh Tripathi born in 1920 is an Indian writer, journalist and a former editor of Panchjanya, a weekly news magazine published by the Rashtriya Swayamsevak Sangh. A former president of the Chandra Shekhar Azad Janmashatabdi Samaroh Samiti, Tripathi has authored several books. He was honored by the Government of India, in 2001, with the fourth highest Indian civilian award of Padma Shri. He died on 30 November 2006 in Lucknow.

== See also ==
- Rashtriya Swayamsevak Sangh
