= Queenie Rynjah =

Indian educationalist and social worker (1919–2015)

Queenie Madaline Rynjah (née Dunn; 23 January 1919 – 16 December 2015) was an Indian social worker and educationist from the state of Meghalaya. She was awarded the Padma Shri award by Government of India in 2004. Rynjah was born to George Dunn and Mied Rangard on 23 January 1919. She died on 16 December 2015, at the age of 96.
