= Joseph H. Pereira =

Indian Roman Catholic priest

- Born: Maharashtra, India
- Occupations: Social worker Writer; Yogi
- Known for: Social service
- Awards: Padma Shri

Joseph H. Pereira, popularly known as the Singing Priest, is an Indian Roman Catholic priest, social worker and the founder trustee of Kripa Foundation, a Mumbai-based non governmental organization working for the rehabilitation of HIV patients and people affected by substance abuse. He has been associated with Mother Teresa and B. K. S. Iyengar and is a member of the New York Academy of Sciences. A pupil of B. K. S. Iyengar and a proponent of Iyengar Yoga, he is a certified instructor of the yoga school. The Government of India awarded him the fourth highest civilian honour of the Padma Shri, in 2009, for his contributions to society.

== Biography ==
Joseph. Hilary. Pereira was born in a Luso-Indian Roman Catholic family to Martha and Hilary Pereira along with 3 other siblings, in the suburbs of Mumbai, in the western Indian state of Maharashtra and did his early schooling locally where he had the opportunity to study Sanskrit. He started learning yoga from the age of eleven and, choosing the vocation of a priest, he enlisted himself in a seminary where he was involved with the choral groups there. He continued his academic studies to secure a master's degree Philosophy and Psychology from the University of Mumbai and a certification in counselling theory and practice from the Hazelden Institute of the Hazelden Foundation, USA. While at the seminary, he got an opportunity to meet B. K. S. Iyengar, renowned yoga guru and the originator of Iyengar Yoga, and joined him as a student of yoga in 1968. In 1971, he started participating in the activities of Mother Teresa and a decade later, he founded Kripa Foundation in 1981, with a few inmates, on the premises of the Church of Our Lady of Mount Carmel, Bandra where he served as the parish priest. The Foundation, which had a modest beginning, grew over the years, presently operating out of 69 centres in India and also has presence in Canada, Germany and USA. The organization works for the rehabilitation of HIV/AIDS patients and the victims of substance abuse and alcoholism and is affiliated to the Ministry of Social Justice and Empowerment. The centre employs yoga as a means to treat alcoholics and drug addicts.

Pereira teaches yoga philosophy in various Indian institutions including the Indian Institute of Management, Ahmedabad and is a member of the New York Academy of Sciences. He is the national coordinator of the World Community for Christian Meditation (WCCM) and is a trustee of the Indian chapter of the Alcoholics Anonymous (AA). He acts as a consultant to the Archdiocese of Bombay in matters related to drug addiction and conducts regular workshops on de-addiction and yoga in India and abroad, for which he has brought out several audio/video CDs such as Wholeness and Holiness, Yoga for the Practice of Christian Meditation, and The Whole Person in Prayer. His students included Lee Kuan Yew, the first Prime Minister of Singapore. He is the author of Yoga for the Practice of Christian Meditation, a guide for beginners of yoga. The Government of India awarded him the civilian honour of the Padma Shri in 2009.

== See also ==
- Mother Teresa
- B. K. S. Iyengar
