= Suwalal Bafna =

Indian politician

Suwalal Chhaganmal Bafna (28 January 1932 – 1 August 2018) was an Indian politician, industrialist and social worker. He was President of Dhule District's Indian National Congress committee for 10 years. He was presented with Padma Shri, India's 4th highest civilian award for his social work in 2006. He had retired from active politics for about 15 years before his death from natural causes in 2018.
