= P. S. Chawngthu =

Indian poet and singer (1922–2005)

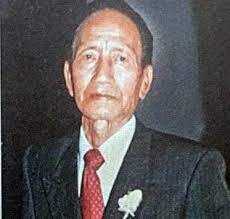
- Pahlira Sena Chawngthu Padma Shri portrait
- Born: 1922; Mizoram, India
- Died: 2005 (aged 82–83)
- Occupations: Poet; Singer; Musician; Broadcaster
- Awards: Padma Shri; Mizo Academy of Letters Award

Pahlira Sena Chawngthu (1922–2005) was a Mizo poet, singer, and radio broadcaster from the Indian state of Mizoram.

== Career ==
PS Chawngthu served the Royal Indian Air Force during pre-independence period. Later, he worked as a broadcaster with the Aizawl station of the All India Radio. His poems are included in the curriculum of the Central Board of Secondary Education (CBSE).

== Awards ==
- He was a recipient of 1999 Mizo Academy of Letters Award.
- The Government of India awarded him the fourth highest civilian award of the Padma Shri in 2000.

== Personal ==
PS Chawngthu was Born in 1922. Chawngthu died on 2005, at the age of 83.
