= Tsering Landol =

Indian gynecologist

Padma Bhushan Tsering Landol
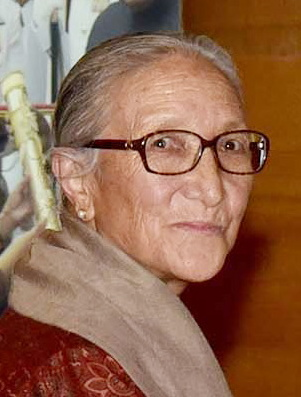
- Dr. Tsering Landol in 2020
- Born: Ladakh, Jammu and Kashmir, India
- Occupation: Gynecologist
- Awards: Padma Shri, Padma Bhushan

Tsering Landol is an Indian gynecologist and one of the pioneers of women's health in the Ladakh Union Territory of India. She is Ladakh's first women gynecologist, who was awarded the Padma Bhushan, the third-highest civilian award in India, in 2020 by the President, Ram Nath Kovind for her outstanding contribution to women's healthcare.

== Early life ==
Dr. Landol was born in 1945 to farming family. She was the first in her family to receive formal education and to have the opportunity to attend school. After completing her education in Srinagar, she began her career at the district hospital in 1979, where she worked in challenging conditions, including sub-zero temperatures.

== Work & recognition ==
Dr. Tsering Landol served at the Sonam Norboo Memorial Government Hospital, Leh and is also associated with other educational institutions. The Government of India awarded her the fourth highest civilian honour of the Padma Shri, in 2006, and Padma Bhusan in 2020 for her contributions to Indian medicine, making her one of the few woman recipients of the award from Jammu and Kashmir and the first Ladakhi woman doctor to receive the honour. She is also featured on the 'Wall of Fame' which features those who have exhibited excellence throughout their career or existence have exemplified glory and greatness. The Wall recognizes those individuals and teams which have attained high achievement and/or made a significant contribution to society. Landol is featured in The Song Collector, a documentary film on the life of the renowned Ladakhi folk musician, Morup Namgyal. She was awarded Padma Bhushan, the third highest civilian award in India in the year 2020. In 2021, Landol became a laureate of the Asian Scientist 100 by the Asian Scientist.
