= A. Sankara Reddy =

Indian academic administrator

A. Sankara Reddy is a former principal of Sri Venkateswara College. He was awarded the prestigious Padma Shri award in 2009 for his contributions in the field of literature and education.
