= Vaidya Suresh Chaturvedi =

Indian Ayurveda practitioner

Suresh Chaturvedi
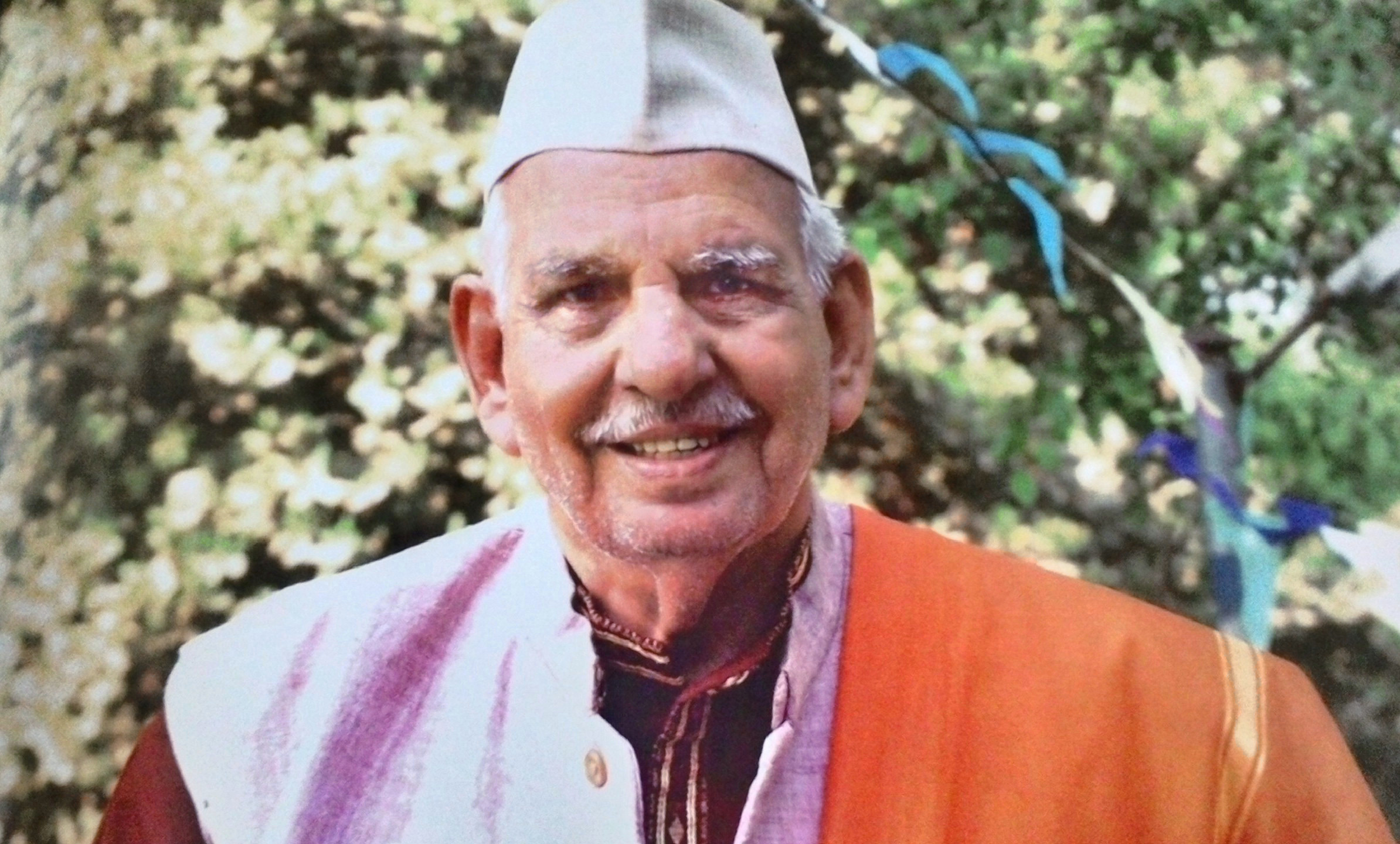
- Born: 14 May 1928; Bharatpur, Rajasthan
- Died: 25 December 2017 (aged 89); Mumbai
- Education: S.D. Ayurvedic College - Lahore, 1947; L.A.M.S. (Vaidya Kaviraj); Ashtanga Ayurvedic College - Calcutta, 1948 M.A.M.S.; Board of Indian Medicine - Lucknow, 1950 B.I.M.S. (Ayurvedacharya)
- Occupation: Ayurveda practitioner
- Spouse: Sudha Chaturvedi
- Children: 6
- Website: www.drchaturvedi.com

Vaidya Suresh Chaturvedi (1928–2017) was an Ayurveda practitioner from Rajasthan, India. Previously he was a professor at Bombay University and has written many books on Ayurveda. In 2000, he was awarded the Padma Shri, the fourth highest civilian award in the India. As an active practitioner of the ancient science of Ayurveda (healing), he is known in the national and international arenas of alternate medicines and has presented numerous papers. He has held a number of conferences in India. He was, a Ph.D guide in the University of Mumbai.

His role in demystifying the Neem's extraordinary ability to heal has been crucial in bringing acceptability to the Neem tree in the global context.

== Early life ==
Born in a Brahmin family to shri Gendalal who was a police inspector in Bharatpur State police. Suresh was his fourth son. He completed his early education till fifth grade from sanatan dharma school. He came to Mumbai in 1938 where he was enrolled in a Sanskrit school in Gulalwadi . After completing his matriculation he enrolled into gokuldas Tejpal Sanskrit College and at the age of 14 witnessed the slogans of quit India from gwaliya tank grand. He was married at the age of 25 to Sudha.

== Education ==
After he discovered his interest in medicinal studies He started studying Ayurveda in 1943 at state Ayurvedic college Jaipur but due to various circumstances he could not complete it and in 1944 he took admission sanatan dharma ayurvedic college Lahore (Re established as S.D college in ambala in 1948 after partition) His studies again received a halt as he had to leave Lahore in 1947 due to the riots leaving midway his course after appearing for the third year exam. He was later awarded the degree "vaidya kaviraj" on this academic completion after which he took admission in Ashtanga ayurvedic college Calcutta. After completing his education he took training as shishya under vaidya nandkishor Sharma and later vaidya ramgopal Sharma and later on he started his own medical practice in Vile-Parle (east), Mumbai, India at B.L. Ruia High School Premises.

== Awards and recognition ==
- Padmashree on the occasion of Golden Jubilee' of Indian Republic.
- Pt Ramnarayan Sharma Award (2008)
- Ayurveda Award
- Shri Vasant Naik Pratishthan Samman
- Bhishakshri(2014)
- Charak Sanmann by Red Swastik society (2015)
- Honorary Physician: Governor of Maharashtra
- Chikatsak Guru: Rashtriya Ayurveda Vidyaeeth, New Delhi
- Consulting Physician: Bombay Hospital (Mumbai)
- Honorary Director Sri Sri Ravi Shankar Ayurvedic College
- Managing Trustee: Arogya Sansthan Trust
- Patron Member: All India Ayurvedic congress
- 1996 Bharat Nirman award by Hon. Shri Karunakaran - Member of Parliament, Govt. of India.
- 1995 International Congress of Alternative Medicine award by Hon. Shri S.N. Reddy - Governor of Orissa.
- 1994 Bharat Nirman award by Hon. Smt. Najama Heptullah - Deputy Speaker (Rajya Sabha), Govt. of India.
- 1993 Bharat Nirman Pracharya award by Hon. Shri Siddheshwar Prasad - Governor of Tripura.

== Bibliography ==
Over the years Dr. Chaturvedi has written thirty-one books on Ayurveda in Hindi, English, Gujrati and Marathi, Former Prime Minister of India, Shri Morarji Desai, released one of his books titled "Geeta Main Arogya" whereas the English version "Geeta and Health" has a foreword by Karan Singh, former Indian Union Minister of Health. In addition he has published various scientific research papers on various diseases like Diabetes, Obesity, Cancer, Heart disease, Leucoderma, and AIDS.

=== Books ===
- Arogya Path
- Ahaar Chikitsa
- Ayurved Ke Rahsya
- Ayurved For You
- Arogya Suman
- Bal Swastha
- Cancer
- Chronic Diseases
- Dampatya Jeevan ke Sopaan
- Diet & Health Through Ayurved
- Fit for Health
- Gharelu Ayurvedic Ilaaj
- Gharelu Dawaiyaan
- Geeta and Health
- Geeta Mein Arogya
- Health Care
- Maharog Chikitsa
- Naari Jeevan ki chintayein
- Kaya Kalp
- Rog Vigyan
- Saral Ayurvedic Chikitsa
- Sau Varsh Kaise Jiyen
- Saundarya Aur Swasthya
- Striyon ka Swasthya aur Rog
- Subodh Ayurved Chikitsa
- Neem in Ayurved
- Neem aur Swasthya
- Ghargathu Davao(Gujrati)
- Beauty & Health
- Health Care
- Kadu Nimba (Marathi)
- Tips for health care

=== Research Papers ===
- Role of Neem in Health and Environment.
- Role of Ayurveda in cancers.

== Previous Positions ==
- Director Of Emami Limited
- Advisor of Lupin Limited
- Vice President of Dhanvantari Medical foundation
- Principal of KGMP Ayurvedic college
- Chairman National Consultative Committee- Neem Foundation
- Ph.D Guide and faculty member in Mumbai University
- Senate member of Rajiv Gandhi University of Health science, Karnataka
- Member of Governing council and finance committee of rashtriya Ayurveda New Delhi and National Institute of Ayurved Jaipur
