= D. S. Rana =

Indian nephrologist

- Born: Dasmal, Hamirpur, Himachal Pradesh, India
- Occupation: Nephrologist
- Awards: Padma Shri

D. S. Rana is an Indian nephrologist and the Chairman of the Department of Nephrology at Sir Ganga Ram Hospital, New Delhi, known for his proficiency in renal transplant procedures. Born in Dasmal, Hamirpur in the Indian state of Himachal Pradesh, he graduated in medicine from the Indira Gandhi Medical College, Shimla and did his advanced training in clinical nephrology at the Postgraduate Institute of Medical Education and Research, Chandigarh. He is an international scholar of the Cleveland Clinic, Ohio and is a member of the Board of Management of the Sir Ganga Ram Hospital. Parvati Education and Health Society, an organization founded by Rana operates a small 5-bedded hospital in his native village of Dasmal for the rural poor. The Government of India awarded him the fourth highest civilian honour of the Padma Shri in 2009, for his contributions to Medicine. He is the first Himachal Pradesh resident awarded Padma Shri.
