= Prema Narendra Purao =

Indian social worker

- Born: 15 August 1935 (age 91); Goa, Portuguese India
- Occupations: Social worker, independence activist
- Known for: Social service
- Spouse: Narendra Purao
- Awards: Padma Shri; AIWEFA Stree Ratna Award; Dr. Durgabai Deshmukh Award-1999

Prema Purao is an Indian social worker, independence activist and the founder of Annapurna Mahila Mandal, a non governmental organization working for the empowerment of destitute women and children. She was involved in the Goan independence movement. During the onslaught leading up to Indian annexation of Goa, Purao was designated to transport arms to activist Mohan Ranade. As she sprinted through a certain forest, a shot was fired by the Portuguese police. Despite the bullet striking her leg, Purao kept running. Once she completed her task and delivered the arms, she was smuggled in a truck to Belgaum, where she could receive medical attention. She founded Annapurna Mahila Mandal in 1975.

A recipient of the AIWEFA Stree Ratna Award, Purao was honored by the Government of India, in 2002, with the fourth highest Indian civilian award of Padma Shri

== See also ==
- Goa liberation movement
