= Theilin Phanbuh =

Indian social worker

- Born: 13 April 1946 (age 80); Shillong, Meghalaya, India
- Occupation: Social worker
- Known for: Social service
- Awards: Padma Shri

Theilin Phanbuh is an Indian social worker and the chairperson of the Meghalaya State Commission for Women (MSCW). Born on 13 April 1946 in Shillong in the Northeast Indian state of Meghalaya, she is reported to have been actively involved with the socio-cultural milieu of the state, especially in cases where women's rights are challenged and delivers lectures on the topic. The Government of India awarded her the fourth highest civilian honour of the Padma Shri, in 2005, for her contributions to Indian society.
