= V. R. Gowrishankar =

Indian religious administrator

- Born: 30 November 1954 (age 71); Karnataka, India
- Occupations: Social worker Religious administrator
- Known for: Sringeri Sharada Peetham
- Spouse: Geetha
- Children: Two children(Chinmayee sharada and Abhinava Chandra)
- Awards: Padma Shri; Rajyotsava Prashasthi

Padma Shri V. R. Gowrishankar is an Indian religious administrator, social worker and former chief executive officer and administrator of Sringeri Sharada Peetham. He was replaced on 12/02/2024 by P.A Murali He is credited with expanding the activities of the Sringeri Math into education and social service. His efforts are reported behind the establishment of the Sringeri Sharada Peetham Temple and community center in Houston, Texas in 2013. The Government of India awarded him the fourth highest civilian honour of India, the Padma Shri, in 2008, for his contributions to society. He has constantly given money for charity to help poor people. V.R Gowrishankar landed in controversy for Sanctioning the Sanskrit studies in Columbia University but due to huge pressure from Indic Sanskrit Scholars, Dr Subramaniam Swamy, Dr Rajiv Malhotra the project was shelved off causing embarrassment to the prestigious institution as well for the administration.

== Biography ==
Gowrishankar was born in the south Indian state of Karnataka on 30 November 1954 in a family closely associated with Sringeri Sharada Peetham where his father and grandfather had earlier served as scholars. He graduated in engineering from B.M.S. College of Engineering, Bengaluru and followed it up with a post graduate degree (DIISc) in industrial management from the Indian Institute of Science. In 1986, he took charge as the chief executive officer and administrator of the Peetham, holding the general power of attorney of the properties and the administrative authority over more than 150 branches and other subsidiary organizations of the Peetham.

Under Gowrishankar's leadership, it is reported that the Math expanded its activities which now include a scheme for providing free meal to children, Swasti Grama Yojana and adoption of villages, Healthcare schemes and providing free educational wares such as computer kits to students. During his tenure as the chief executive officer, Math constructed a new residence for the pontiff, a new dining hall with a capacity to host 3000 people at a time (considered to be the largest of its kind in Asia) and a new headquarters for the Veda Samskrita Pathashala (School of Vedas). His contributions are also reported in the establishment of a temple in Houston and two other temples in Detroit and California. He then has also participated in the social movements and his leadership of the public movement against the demolition of heritage properties by the Nashik Municipal Corporation for widening road was one such activism.

Besides heading the administration, he is also a part of the management of many Math organizations. He is a member of the Board of Trustees of the Sringeri Vidya Bharati Foundation in Canada, chief executive officer of the Sringeri Sharada Peetham Charitable Trust, and of the Board of Governors of Rangadore Memorial Hospital, a charitable hospital under the trust, and a member of the Board of Governors of the Adi Shankara Institute of Engineering Technology. He has had the honour to address the General Assembly of the United Nations. The Government of Karnataka awarded him their second highest civilian award of Rajyotsava Prashasthi in 2003 and he received the fourth highest Indian civilian honour of the Padma Shri in 2008.

Gowrishankar is married to Geetha and the couple has two children.

== See also ==
- Sringeri Sharada Peetham
