= Rajagopalan Krishnan =

Indian ayurvedic physician (1932–2015)

- Born: 17 November 1932; Kollam, Kerala, India
- Died: 10 January 2015 (aged 82); Kollam, Kerala, India
- Other name: K Rajagopalan
- Occupation: Ayurvedic practitioner
- Years active: 1961 - 2014
- Parent(s): M. P. Krishnan Vaidyan; Kalyanikutty Amma
- Awards: Padma Shri; Brihatrayee Ratna; Vaidya Vachaspati

Rajagopalan Krishnan Vaidyan (17 November 1932 – 10 January 2015) was an Indian ayurvedic practitioner from the Indian state of Kerala and the president of the Association of Ayurvedic Physicians of Kerala.

== Early life and education ==
He was born in a family of traditional physicians to M. P. Krishnan Vaidyan and P. Kalyanikutty Amma, both practitioners of Ayurveda, and is a graduate of modern medicine (MBBS) and Ayurvedic medicine (DAM), which he passed with first rank from the Ayurveda College, Thiruvananthapuram. Krishnan, who started his career at his family clinic and later worked at the Panchakarma Clinic in Cheruthuruthi, maintained his practice at his clinic in Kollam.

== Associations ==
He was associated with many healthcare institutions in Kerala such as

- Amala Institute of Medical Sciences, Thrissur, Arya Vaidya Sala, Kottakkal,
- Ayurveda Pharmacy, Aluva and Ayurveda Samajam Hospitals, located at Thiruvananthapuram and Shornur, either as a consultant or as an advisor.
- He was an examiner of ayurvedic courses conducted by University of Kerala, Mahatma Gandhi University, University of Madras and Bharathiar University
- He also worked as the Dean of Sree Sankaracharya University of Sanskrit. He is also a member of the Central Council of Indian Medicine
- He was an advisor on Indian medicine to the Government of Kerala.

== Awards ==
He was honored by the Government of India in 2003, with the fourth highest Indian civilian award, Padma Shri.
