= B. Paul Thaliath =

Indian oncologist

- Born: 18 September 1952 (age 73); Kerala, India
- Occupation: Oncologist
- Known for: Radiation oncology
- Spouse: Mary Paul
- Children: Augustine Paul; Dr Sebastian Paul
- Awards: Padma Shri

B. Paul Thaliath is an Indian radiation oncologist from the South Indian state of Kerala.

He is the additional director of the Regional Cancer Centre and the Head of the Department of Radiation Oncology at Kamla Nehru Memorial Hospital, Prayagraj. He is known to be involved with several cancer awareness programs and has been a part of the Cancer and Women programme in connection with the National Cancer Awareness Day of 2006. Thaliath was honored by the Government of India, in 2007, with the fourth highest Indian civilian award of Padma Shri.

== See also ==
- Oncology
