= Immaneni Sathyamurthy =

Indian cardiologist

- Born: India
- Occupation: Cardiologist
- Awards: Padma Shri

Immaneni Sathyamurthy is an Indian cardiologist and the director of the department of cardiology at Apollo Hospitals, Chennai. A former member of faculty at the Christian Medical College & Hospital, Vellore, he is known to be a specialist in interventional cardiology. He is credited with several publications, some of which have been prescribed as text for medical courses. He was honored by the Government of India, in 2000, with the fourth highest Indian civilian award of Padma Shri.
