= Mathoor Krishnamurty =

Indian scholar

- Born: Karnataka, India
- Occupations: Writer; Scholar
- Awards: Padma Shri; Sir M. Visvesvaraya Shiromani Award

Mathoor Krishnamurty is an Indian writer, scholar and the director of the Bengaluru centre of the Bharatiya Vidya Bhavan. He has written several articles on Vedas and Upanishads and has published books including Gandhi Upanishad, a biographical account on Mohandas Gandhi, and The World Is One Family: Wisdom of the Vedas. He is a recipient of the 2008 Sir M. Visvesvaraya Shiromani Award of the Sir M. Visvesvaraya Foundation. The Government of India awarded him the fourth highest civilian honour of the Padma Shri, in 2009, for his contributions to Literature and Education.
