= Kim Yang-shik =

Korean poet, essayist and Indologist (born 1931)

- Born: January 4, 1931 (age 95); Seoul, South Korea
- Died: January 29, 2025 (aged 94); Seoul, South Korea
- Education: Ewha Womans University
- Occupations: Poet, writer
- Awards: Padma Shri

Korean name
- Hangul: 김양식
- Hanja: 金良植
- RR: Gim Yangsik
- MR: Kim Yangsik

Art name
- Hangul: 초이
- Hanja: 初荑
- RR: Choi
- MR: Ch'oi

Kim Yang-shik (Korean: 김양식; born January 4, 1931) is a South Korean poet, essayist and Indologist.

== The Indian connection ==
Kim Yang-shik was born in Seoul on January 4, 1931. At Ewha Womans University she studied English literature and then took an MA in Indian philosophy. Inspired by the writings of Rabindranath Tagore, and having made the first of many visits to India in 1975, she founded the Tagore Society of Korea in 1981 and has been steadily translating Tagore's poetical works into Korean. She is also the incumbent Director of the Indian Art Museum in Seoul. She was honored by the Government of India in 2002 with the highest Indian civilian award of the Golden Padma Shri for her contributions to cultural exchange through the Korea-India Cultural Society.

== Poetry ==
Kim Yang-shik began publishing her own poetry during the 1970s and has authored several collections. Her Indian connection has been fruitful, not only providing her with inspiration for such collections as "The Day Breaks of India" (1999) but also as the country from which several other translations of her work have been published. Her poems have been translated into several other languages and in 2009 there appeared another selection in Swedish translation, De är aldrig ensamma (They are never alone), followed by a French translation, India, in 2014. An essayist in addition, she has published "An Encounter with Foreign Poets" (1978), "Along the Stream of Ganges" (1990) and "Spring, Summer, Autumn and Winter" (2000).

Among the literary associations to which Kim belongs are the Korean Modern Poets' Association and the Korean Women Writers' Association; she is also involved with the Korean chapter of the International PEN Club. She was the recipient of the Muse Of World Poetry award at the second Congress of World Poets in Taipei in 1973 and the PEN Literary Award from the Korean PEN Club in 2002.

The poem "Compassion" gives an idea of Kim's individual style:

Leaving is not simply leaving
and staying is not simply staying.

People and beasts and even plants:
each stays as if leaving
and leaves as if staying.

There is no heaven without earth,
neither is there earth without heaven.

All created as one in the beginning
remain as one endlessly.

Likewise
no one stays without leaving
or leaves without staying.

== Works in English translation ==
- Bird's Sunrise & other poems, Calcutta, India (1986)
- India : selected poems by Kim Yang-Shik, Seoul (1993)
- They Are Never Lonely, translators Jin-sup Kim, Eugene W. Zeilfelder, Seoul (1998)
- The Day Breaks of India, a trilingual edition with Kim Yang-Shik's Korean originals accompanied by translations into English by Jin-sup Kim, and into Hindi by Divik Ramesh; Delhi, India (1999)
