= Bisweswar Bhattacharjee =

Indian chemical engineer

- Born: 1942 (age 83–84); West Bengal, India
- Occupation: Chemical engineer
- Known for: Gas centrifuge
- Awards: Padma Shri

Bisweswar Bhattacharjee is an Indian chemical engineer, multi-disciplinary scientist and a former director of the Chemical Engineering and Technology Group of the Bhabha Atomic Research Centre (BARC). He is a former project director of the Rare Materials Project, Mysore and a member of the Atomic Energy Commission of India. Bhattacharjee, a recipient of the civilian honour of the Padma Shri, is best known for his contributions in the development of gas centrifugal technology for the High Speed Rotors (HSR), used in the production of enriched uranium and other strategic materials, at BARC.

== Biography ==
Bhattacharjee was born in 1942 in the Indian state of West Bengal and joined University College of Technology, Kolkata to secure his master's degree in chemical engineering from there. Later, he joined BARC Training School to pass out in 1996. He served the Uranium Corporation of India at Jaduguda, Bihar, the only Uranium mill in the country and was instrumental in the establishment of the Rare Materials Plant, a classified project in the Ratnahalli village of Mysore. He has also been involved with the development of desalination plants for BARC; the plant attached to the Madras Atomic Power Station, Kalpakkam is one of the fifteen plants supplied by BARC in the country. He became the director of Bhabha Atomic Research Centre in 2001 and stayed at the post until 2004, handing over the charges to Srikumar Banerjee in April. It was during his tenure as the head of BARC, an accident occurred at the Kalpakkam reprocessing plant, on 21 January 2003, which caused exposure of six BARC personnel to radiation.

Bhattacharjee is an elected Fellow of the Indian National Academy of Engineering (INAE) and a former member of the Nuclear and Radiological Emergency at the National Disaster Management Authority. He also served as a member of the Atomic Energy Commission of India. He has contributed the foreword to Chemical Metallurgy: Principles and Practice, a text book on chemical metallurgy, published in 2006. The Government of India awarded him the fourth highest civilian award of the Padma Shri, in 2001, for his services to the fields of science and engineering.

== See also ==
- Atomic Energy Commission of India
- Bhabha Atomic Research Centre
- Gas centrifuge
