= Colette Mathur =

French writer and Indologist

- Born: Belgium
- Occupations: Writer; Indologist
- Known for: South Asia networking
- Awards: Padma Shri

Colette Mathur, a French writer and Indologist, is the president of the EuroIndia Centre, a non-governmental organization promoting interaction between various organizations in India and Europe, through networking. She is the Director - South Asia at the World Economic Forum, the Switzerland-based non-profit organization for public-private cooperation.

Born in Brussels, Mathur did her college studies at University of Geneva.

She worked as a public relations officer in Brussels before joining the World Economic Forum in 1979. She has held several posts at the WEF such as the Member of the Executive Board and as the Director for South Asia and is committee member of the Geneva Asia Society and a founding member of the EuroIndia Centre. India Rising: Emergence of a New World Power, a book Mathur has co-authored with Frank-Jürgen Richter and Tarun Das, details the emergence of India as a world power and analyses the challenges the country faces.

== Awards and honours ==
The Government of India awarded her the fourth highest civilian honour of the Padma Shri, in 2008, for her contributions to the country.
