= Muzaffer Hussain =

Indian writer, journalist, and columnist (1940–2018)

Muzaffer Hussain (20 March 1940 – 14 February 2018) was an Indian writer, journalist and columnist. He was born in Bhopal, Madhya Pradesh and later moved to Mumbai in his youth for earning livelihood. He wrote columns in various newspapers and magazines in Hindi and Urdu. For over 12 years he published under the column Padsaad in the Marathi newspaper Saamana along with few articles in Hindi version as well. He was noted to be nationalist and pro-Hindutva and wrote critical about various Islamic traditions like triple talaak. In 2002, he was presented with Padma Shri, India's 4th highest civilian honour. In 2014, the Government of Maharashtra honoured his lifelong contributions with Lokamanya Tilak Jeevan Gaurav Award.

== Books ==
- Islam Aur Shakahar, (2007) Prabhat Prakashan ISBN 9788188140848
- Khatre Alpsankhyakwad Ke, (2008) Prabhat Prakashan ISBN 9788173155284
- Muslim Manasshastra
- Dango Me Jhulsi Mumbai
- Islam Dharmatil Kutumb Niyojan
- Laden
- Dahshadwaad Aani Afghanistan
- Samaan Naagri Kayada
