= Hashmat Ullah Khan =

Indian craftsman

Hashmat Ullah Khan, also spelled Hashmatullah Khan, (born in 1954 in Nawab Bazaar, Srinagar City, India) is a Kashmiri Kani shawl promoter and entrepreneur. In 2009, he was conferred the Padma Shri, India's fourth highest civilian honour, for reviving the weaving of Kani shawls.

Also in 2009, Khan was spokesman of the Kashmir Handicrafts Traders' Welfare Association.
