= Dasika Durga Prasada Rao =

Indian geoscientist

- Born: 1939; Hyderabad State, India
- Occupation: Geocientist
- Awards: Padma Shri; Bhaskara Award

Dasika Durga Prasada Rao is an Indian geoscientist and the former director of the National Remote Sensing Agency. Born in 1939 to a family of Guntur-Vijayawada region. He is a 1998 Fellow of the National Academy of Sciences, India. In 2001, Rao was honored with the Padma Shri, India's fourth-highest civilian award, by the Government of India. Two years later, he received the Bhaskara Award from the Indian Society of Remote Sensing in 2003.

== See also ==
- National Remote Sensing Agency
- National Academy of Sciences, India
