= Jitendra Mohan Hans =

Indian otorhinolaryngologist, medical researcher and inventor

- Born: 27 November 1955 (age 70); New Delhi, India
- Occupation: Otorhinolaryngologist
- Known for: Hans Speech Valve
- Awards: Padma Shri
- Website: drjmhans.com

J M Hans is an Indian otorhinolaryngologist, medical researcher and the inventor of HANS speech valve for speech rehabilitation after laryngeal cancer surgery. He is a founder member of the Cochlear Implant Group of India and has been a part of the Defence Research and Development Organisation (DRDO) sponsored project team that developed an indigenous Bionic Ear in 2013. Born on 27 November 1955, he graduated in medicine from the University of Meerut in 1978 He has served as the Honorary ENT Surgeon to the Prime Minister of India and is a government nominee at Ali Yajur Jung National Institute for Deafness, Mumbai and the All India Institute of Speech and Hearing, Mysore. He is reported to have pioneered the minimally-invasive surgical techniques for cochlear implants and is a member of the advisory boards of the Union Public Service Commission and World Health Organization (WHO). He was Chairman of the 3rd National CIGI Conference in New Delhi, 4–6 November 2005, where President Abdul Kalam of India presented. The Government of India awarded him the fourth highest civilian honour of the Padma Shri in 2005, for his contributions towards medicine.

Prof Dr J M Hans Cochlear Implantation Surgery Former He was the Professor and Head of the department of ENT at Ram Manohar Lohia Hospital, New Delhi (1999.2009)
