= C. U. Velmurugendran =

Indian neurologist

- Born: C. Uthamaroyan Velmurugendran; 10 May 1940 (age 86); Tamil Nadu, India
- Died: 9.3.2025; Choolaimedu, Chennai
- Occupations: Neurologist medical writer
- Known for: Neurology
- Spouse: P.A.Pattavarthini
- Children: Dr.V.Krithika V.Jayashree Dr.C.V.Shankar Ganesh
- Parent: DR CS. Uthamaroyan Rajakantheswari
- Awards: Padma Shri
- Website: Website

C. U. Velmurugendran was an Indian neurologist, medical writer and the chairman and head of the Department of Neurology at the Sri Ramachandra Medical College and Research Institute, Chennai. He was an honorary professor at the Sri Venkateswara Institute of Medical Sciences, Tirupati and has contributed chapters to books including Diseases of the Spinal Cord, published in 2012. The Government of India awarded him the fourth highest civilian honour of the Padma Shri, in 2008, for his contributions to medicine.

== Biography ==
Born to DR C.S. Uthamaroyan in the south Indian state of Tamil Nadu, Velmurugendran graduated in medicine (MB BS) from University of Madras and followed it up with the degrees of MD and DM from the same institution,{.Prof & Head, Neurology Dept: Inst of Neurology, Madras Medical College & Govt Gen Hospital, Chennai 1985-98, Sri Ramachandra Medical College & Research Inst, Chennai 1999-2016; Prof Emeritus, Tamil Nadu Dr. M.G.R Medical Univ, Chennai 1999-; Hon Prof, Sri Venkateswara Inst of Medical Scs, Tirupati 2002-; Moving to the World Health Organization (WHO) and after working for one year during 1974–75, he joined the faculty of Neurosciences at the Tamil Nadu Dr. M.G.R. Medical University in 1975. He continued there till 1999 to superannuate as the Professor Emeritus and joined the Sri Ramachandra Medical College and Research Institute. In between, he also served as the Faculty Selection Committee of the Sree Chitra Tirunal Institute for Medical Sciences and Technology, Thiruvananthapuram, (1994) and Banares Hindu University (1996–1998). A recipient of the degree of Doctor of Science (honoris causa) from the Tamil Nadu Dr. M.G.R. Medical University, he is the founder of a sheltered workshop for chronic epileptic patients in Chennai and has organized several medical conferences, including the International Congress of Child Neurology 2016 at Chennai. He was elected as a fellow of the National Academy of Medical Sciences in 2006, and was awarded the civilian honour of the Padma Shri by the Government of India in 2008. He is also a recipient of the Lifetime Achievement Award of Madras Neuro Trust.
