= S. C. Manchanda =

Indian cardiologist

- Born: India
- Occupation: Cardiologist
- Awards: Padma Shri

Subhash Chand Manchanda is an Indian cardiologist and a senior consultant of Sir Ganga Ram Hospital, New Delhi. He is a Senior Consultant and Co-ordinator of the Diplomate of National Board program of the National Board of Examinations and a former professor and Head of the Department of Cardiology at the All India Institute of Medical Sciences, New Delhi (AIIMS). He is the chairman of the advisory board of Diya Foundation, a non governmental organization managing a number of charitable institutions for the under-privileged children and aged people.

Manchanda worked at AIIMS for 36 years and superannuated from the institution in 2003 to join Sir Ganga Ram Hospital in the Indian capital city as a senior consultant cardiologist. He is known to have done researches on reversal of heart diseases by Yoga practice and diet control and conducts regular camps at Adhyatma Sadhna Kendra at Mehrauli in Delhi. He is the Editor-in-chief of the Journal of Preventive Cardiology and is credited with over 300 articles and four books on cardiology. He is also a member of the editorial board of the Journal of Clinical and Preventive Cardiology. The Government of India awarded him the civilian honour of the Padma Shri in 2004.

== See also ==
- Sir Ganga Ram Hospital (India)
- All India Institute of Medical Sciences Delhi
