= Katuru Narayana =

Indian rocket scientist

- Born: India
- Occupation: Rocket scientist
- Known for: Satish Dhawan Space Centre
- Awards: Padma Shri

Katuru Narayana is an Indian rocket scientist and a former director of Satish Dhawan Space Centre, one of the two launch centres of the Indian Space Research Organisation. He held the post from 1999 to 2005 after which he served as the co-chairman of the Mission Readiness Review Committee for two Indian space programs, Polar Satellite Launch Vehicle and Geosynchronous Satellite Launch Vehicle. He is a recipient of an honorary doctorate from Sri Venkateswara University. In 2002, the Government of India awarded him the Padma Shri, India's fourth-highest civilian honour, for his contributions to science and engineering.

== See also ==
- Satish Dhawan Space Centre
- Polar Satellite Launch Vehicle
- Geosynchronous Satellite Launch Vehicle
