= Morup Namgyal =

Indian folk musician, composer, and dramatist

Morup Namyal
- Born: 16 April 1947; Wanla Lamyot pa, Leh district, Ladakh, Jammu and Kashmir, India
- Education: Bodhi College
- Occupations: Folk musician Composer; Dramatist
- Known for: Ladakhi folk songs
- Awards: Padma Shri

Morup Namgyal is an Indian folk musician, composer and dramatist, known for his contributions for the revival of Ladakhi and Tibetan folk music tradition.

== Works ==
He is reported to have traveled across the Ladakhi region in the 1960s and documented the songs of the region which has assisted in the preservation of the regional musical tradition. He is one of the founders of Lamdon Social Welfare Society and Lamdon School, a not-for-profit institution promoting the cultural heritage of Ladakh. Noted as an active figure in Ladakhi society, he is a member of the advisory board of the Ladakh Arts and Media Organisation (LAMO). and has contested in the Assembly Elections from the Lingshed constituency, though unsuccessfully. The Government of India awarded him the fourth highest civilian honour of the Padma Shri, in 2004, for his contributions to Indian music. His life has been made into a documentary, The Song Collector, directed by Erik Koto.

== See also ==
- Ladakh
- Tsering Landol
