= Vijay Kumar Dada =

Indian ophthalmologist

- Born: India
- Occupation: Ophthalmologist
- Known for: Ophthalmology
- Awards: Padma Shri

Vijay Kumar Dada is an Indian ophthalmologist and a consultant at the Sir Ganga Ram Hospital, New Delhi. An alumnus and a former chief of the Dr. R. P. Centre for Ophthalmic Sciences of the All India Institute of Medical Sciences, he has written several articles on eye diseases such as cataract and glaucoma. Dada, an elected fellow of the National Academy of Medical Sciences, was honored by the Government of India, in 2002, with the fourth highest Indian civilian award of Padma Shri.

== See also ==
- Cataract
- Glaucoma
