= Gyan Chandra Mishra =

Indian immunologist

- Born: 15 August 1947 (age 79); India
- Occupation: Cell biologist
- Known for: Immunology
- Awards: Padma Shri; Ranbaxy Research Foundation Award

Gyan Chandra Mishra (born August 15, 1947) is an Indian immunologist, cell biologist and the director of the National Centre for Cell Science, Pune, known for his researches towards the therapeutic control of diseases such as HIV, tuberculosis and malaria. He was honoured by the Government of India in 2003 with the Padma Shri, the fourth-highest Indian civilian award.

== Biography ==
Gyan Chandra Mishra, born on the Indian Independence Day of 15 August 1947, graduated (BSc) in biology from Gorakhpur University from where he secured his master's degree (MSc), too. His doctoral studies (PhD) were at the University of Udaipur on completion of which he joined the Central Drug Research Institute (CDRI), Lucknow as a Pool Officer. Later, he underwent advanced training in immunology at the Southwestern Medical Centre of the University of Texas in Dallas and, on return to India in 1987, he joined the Institute of Microbial Technology (IMTECH), Chandigarh as a scientist. In 1995, he moved to the National Center for Cell Science, Pune and serves the institute as its director.

Mishra is credited with research in the field of immunology related to the diseases of HIV, leishmaniasis, malaria and tuberculosis and his researches have been recorded by way of scientific papers published in several peer reviewed journals. He is an elected fellow of Indian National Science Academy, National Academy of Sciences, India and the Indian Academy of Sciences. He has also guided several doctoral students. Mishra, a recipient of the Ranbaxy Research Foundation Award in 2002, was awarded the Padma Shri by the Government of India in 2003.

== See also ==
- Immunology
- Cell biology
