= Ashok K. Vaid =

Indian medical oncologist

- Born: Jammu and Kashmir, India
- Occupation: Medical oncologist
- Known for: Bone marrow transplantion Chemotherapy
- Awards: Padma Shri

Ashok K. Vaid is an Indian medical oncologist, who specializes in bone marrow transplantation. He is credited with the performance of the first 25 bone marrow transplantations in the private sector in North India. He heads the Cancer Institute- Division of Medical Oncology and Haemotology at Medanta The Medicity.

== Biography ==
After graduating in medicine (MBBS) from the University of Jammu in 1983 and securing his MD in Internal Medicine from the same institution in 1989, Vaid worked as a senior resident at the department of oncology of the All India Institute of Medical Sciences, Delhi during 1990–91. While doing his senior residency at Adyar Cancer Institute, he studied for and secured DM in medical oncology from Tamil Nadu Dr. M.G.R. Medical University, Chennai. Returning to Jammu, he joined the Government Medical College, as a consultant oncologist and a faculty at the department of Internal Medicine and worked there till 1997, when he joined the Rajiv Gandhi Cancer Institute and Research Centre, New Delhi as a senior consultant of medical oncology. His next move was to Artemis Health Institute, Gurgaon in 2007 as the head of the department of medical oncology and two years later he joined Medanta.

Vaid is the author of several research articles on oncology and ResearchGate, an online repository of scientific articles, has listed 30 of them. He is a founder member of the Indian Cooperative Oncology Network (ICON) and a life member of such organizations as Breast Cancer Foundation of India, Indian Association of Gynaec Oncologists (IAGO), Indian Medical Association (IMA), and Indian Association of Clinical Medicine (IACM). He is also a member of the Indian Society of Medical and Pediatric Oncology (ISMPO), Association of Physicians of India (API), American Society of Clinical Oncology (ASCO), European Society for Medical Oncology (ESMO) and European Hematology Association (EHA). He is the consultant editor of JK Science and sits in the Editorial Board of Current Trends in Asian Oncology. The Government of India awarded him the fourth highest civilian honour of the Padma Shri, in 2009, for his contributions to Medicine.
