= Yumlembam Gambhini Devi =

Indian singer of Nata Sankirtana (born 1945)

- Born: 1 January 1945 (age 81); Yaiskul Hiruhanba Leikai, Manipur, India
- Occupations: Singer, Dancer
- Known for: Nata Sankirtana, Manipuri dance
- Spouse: Konsam Thopi Singh
- Parent: Y. Gulap Singh
- Awards: Padma Shri; Sangeet Natak Akademi Award; Nritya Ratna Award; Nat Sangeet Award

Yumlembam Gambhini Devi is an Indian singer of Nata Sankirtana and dancer of Manipuri Raas. She is a member of faculty at Jawaharlal Nehru Manipur Dance Academy (JNMDA) and a recipient of the 1988 Sangeet Natak Akademi Award. The Government of India awarded her the fourth highest civilian honour of the Padma Shri, in 2005, for her contributions to Manipuri dance and music.

== Biography ==
Gambhini Devi was born on the New Year day of 1945 at Yaiskul Hiruhanba Leikai in the Northeast Indian state of Manipur to Y. Gulap Singh, a Nata Sankirtana performer, as the fourth of his eight children. She started learning music and dance at the age of 5 and, later, joined the Jawaharlal Nehru Manipur Dance Academy (JNMDA) from where she secured a post graduate diploma in Raas. At the Academy, she received training from such notable gurus such as Amudon Sharma, Maisnam Amubi Singh, Khaidem Lokeshor Singh, Kshetritombi Devi, Ngangom Jogendra Singh and Ibopishak Sharma, in Manipuri dance and from Nongmaithem Tomba Singh, Khanda Moina Dan, Ngangom Jogendra Singh and Thokchom Gopal Singh in music (Monoharsai Kirtan). Her debut performance was when she was 7 years old and has performed on various stages in India and abroad since then. Her teaching career started at her alma mater where she worked as a member of faculty till her superannuation in 2005. While continuing as a visiting Senior Guru (Guruhan) at the Academy, she worked for the Imphal station of the All India Radio as a Top Grade Artist, reportedly the first female artist from the state to get the top grade. She also founded a music training institute, YGR, Nat Sankirtana Sheidam Shang. She is a former member of the selection committee of the Rabindra Bharati University and the Central Dance Audition Board of the Doordarshan, the Indian national television network. Her songs have been compiled in two albums and she has published a book under the name, Basak, on Basak songs.

Manipuri Sahitya Parishad awarded Devi the Nritya Ratna Award in 1979 and she received the Nat Sangeet Award from the Manipur State Kala Akademi in 1980. Sangeet Natak Akademi Award for Nata Sankirtan reached her in 1988, the same year as she was selected for the Senior Fellowship by the Department of Culture, under the Ministry of Human Resource Development. The Government of India honoured her with the civilian award of the Padma Shri in 2005.

== See also ==
- Manipuri dance
- Maisnam Amubi Singh
