= Sivananda Rajaram =

Indian social worker (died 2020)

- Born: Chennai, Tamil Nadu, India
- Died: 18 February 2020
- Known for: Social service
- Awards: Padma Shri

Sivananda Rajaram was an Indian social worker and the General Secretary of Sivananda Saraswathi Sevasaram, a non governmental organization working for the cause of orphans. He took over the reins of Sivananda Saraswathi Sevasaram at the age of 19 from his parents who founded the organization. His efforts under the aegis of the organization is reported to be reaching numerous villages in the south Indian state of Tamil Nadu. He was honored by the Government of India, in 2002, with the fourth highest Indian civilian award of Padma Shri.
