= Shafaat Ahmed Khan =

Indian tabla player (1954–2005)

- Born: 20 May 1954; New Delhi, Delhi, India
- Died: 24 July 2005 (aged 51)
- Occupation: Tabla player (Hindustani classical music)
- Awards: Padma Shri Award in 2003 by the Government of India

Ustad Shafaat Ahmed Khan (20 May 1954 – 24 July 2005) New Delhi, India, was one of the leading tabla maestros in the field of Hindustani classical music.

Shafaat Ahmed Khan came from the "Dilli Gharana" (Delhi gharana) and was the son and disciple of tabla maestro Ustad Chhamma Khan who was a prominent exponent of the Dilli Gharana. Shafaat Ahmed Khan was famous for his mastery over clear 'bols' and melodious tone of the tabla, accompaniment (sangat) and systematic improvisation. During his active years he was one of the leading tabla maestros of India. Shafaat Ahmed Khan was a recipient of "Padma Shree" award in 2003.

He performed concerts all around the world with classical artistes like Ravi Shankar, Nikhil Banerjee, Shivkumar Sharma, Amjad Ali Khan, Bhimsen Joshi, Jasraj, Hari Prasad Chaurasia, Kishori Amonkar, Birju Maharaj, besides performances as solo artist. Shafaat Ahmed Khan also played various taal vadya kacheris and jugalbandis with carnatic artists like Vikku Vinayakram, Lalgudi Jayaraman, Balamurali Krishna, Vellore Ramabhadran, Sivamani, Shankar Mahadevan and others, internationally. Shafaat Ahmed Khan was popular among artists because of his humble nature and down to earth attitude.

== Awards and recognition ==
Shafaat Ahmed Khan was a recipient of the fourth highest Indian civilian award, "Padma Shri" in 2003.

== Death ==
He died at age 51 on 24 July 2005 after being diagnosed with acute Hepatitis-B.
