= Pannuru Sripathy =

Traditional painting artist from Andhra Pradesh, India

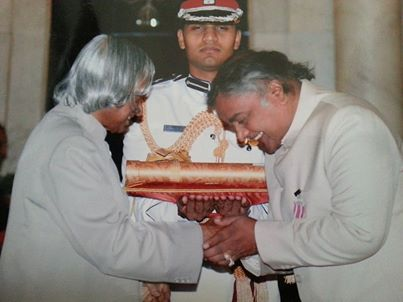
award

Pannuru Sripathi (born 20 April 1943) in a small village near Tirupathi, Andhra Pradesh, India, is a traditional painter who won the Padma Shri Award in 2007. Sripathi obtained a diploma in Drawing in 1969. Sripathi has served the traditional craft by training more than 1000 younger generations and art lovers in India and abroad. Sripathi represented India in Japan, Russia, US, Singapore, Austria, and Germany for festival of India.

== Awards and accolades ==
- State Award 1986
- National Award 2001
- Shilp Guru Award 2006 (Tanjore Style Painting)
- Padma Shri Award 2007
- Shilp Guru Award 2008
