= Indu Bhushan Sinha =

Indian nephrologist (born 1935)

- Born: 1 January 1938; Bihar, India
- Died: 14 November 2022 (aged 84)
- Occupations: Nephrologist; Academic
- Spouse: Kumudani Sinha
- Children: 2
- Awards: Padma Shri

Indu Bhushan Sinha (1 Jan 1938 – 14 Nov 2022) was an Indian nephrologist and medical academic from the Indian state of Bihar. He is a former professor and head of the department of nephrology at Patna Medical College and Hospital. He has served as the editor of The Patna Journal of Medicine of the Indian Medical Association (1986–89) and is a life member of the Indian Society of Nephrology. The Government of India awarded him the fourth highest civilian honour of the Padma Shri, in 2008, for his contributions to medical science.

== Life and career ==
Indu Bhushan Sinha was born on 1 January 1938, in Supaur Jamua village, Munger district, Bihar. His father, Late Panch Badan Singh, worked for the government. His academic performance was outstanding and he graduated from the prestigious Patna Medical College, Patna, in 1960. He joined the Bihar health services. His academic journey though continued and he did his postgraduation in general medicine and dermatology from Patna University. In addition to training in nephrology at Christian Medical College, Vellore, AIIMS, New Delhi, Jaslok Hospital, Mumbai, and Royal Liverpool Hospital, he was selected by the Bihar government for specialized training. His extensive experience at various centers led him to take teaching assignments at the Patna Medical College Department of General Medicine, where he continued as a professor until his retirement. At Patna Medical College, he established the first dialysis unit in Bihar and Jharkhand. Among his students, he was very popular. He was the president of the India Society of Nephrology, The Association of Physicians of India (Bihar branch), and the Indian Medical Association.

He died on 14 November 2022.

=== Awards ===
- Padma Shree by the President of India in the year 2008.
- "Master Teacher" award by the Association of Physicians of India.
- "Dronacharya Award" by the Association of Vascular Access and Interventional Society Physicians.
- "Lifetime Achievement Award" by the Indian Society of Nephrology (2019) and Tamil Nadu Kidney Research Foundation (2017).
