= Verna Elizabeth Watre Ingty =

Indian social worker and organizer

- Born: 1931-1932; Shillong, Meghalaya, India
- Died: 14 January 2004 (aged 72); Shillong
- Occupation: Social worker
- Spouse: Pratap Ingty
- Children: P. W. Ingty
- Awards: Padma Shri

Verna Elizabeth Watre Ingty was an Indian social worker and a former chairman of Meghalaya State Welfare Advisory Board. She was the president of Mothers' Union of Tura. She was honoured by the Government of India in 2003 with Padma Shri, the fourth highest Indian civilian award, making her the first person from Garo tribe to receive the award. Ingty died, aged 72, at Shillong, Meghalaya on 14 January 2004. Her son, P. W. Ingty is an author and an IAS officer.

== See also ==
- Garo people
