= Randhir Sud =

Indian gastroenterologist

- Born: India
- Occupation: Gastroenterologist
- Known for: Gastro Intestinal Endoscopy
- Awards: Padma Shri
- Website: on Medanta

Randhir Sud is an Indian gastroenterologist and the Chairman of the Medanta Institute of Digestive and Hepatobiliary Sciences. He is known for his contributions in gastrointestinal oncology in India. He is a former co-chairman of the department of gastroenterology at Sir Ganga Ram Hospital, New Delhi.

Sud graduated in medicine (MBBS) from the Government Medical College, Amritsar in 1977 and started his career as a junior resident doctor at the All India Institute of Medical Sciences, Delhi in 1979. While working, he continued his studies at AIIMS to secure an MD in 1981 and followed it up with a DM in gastroenterology in 1983. He worked at AIIMS till 1985 and moved to Sir Ganga Ram Hospital, Delhi, where he worked for 25 years till his move to Medanta in 2010. In between, he also served as a visiting professor at the Harvard Medical School, Boston in 1999, at the University of Texas Medical Branch (UTMB), Galveston, Texas and the University of Alabama, Birmingham. He is also an examiner for the Diplomate of National Board examinations in Gastroenterology of the National Board of Examinations. The Government of India awarded him the fourth highest civilian honour of the Padma Shri, in 2008, for his contributions to medicine.
