= Gennadi Mikhailovich Pechinkov =

Russian actor and director

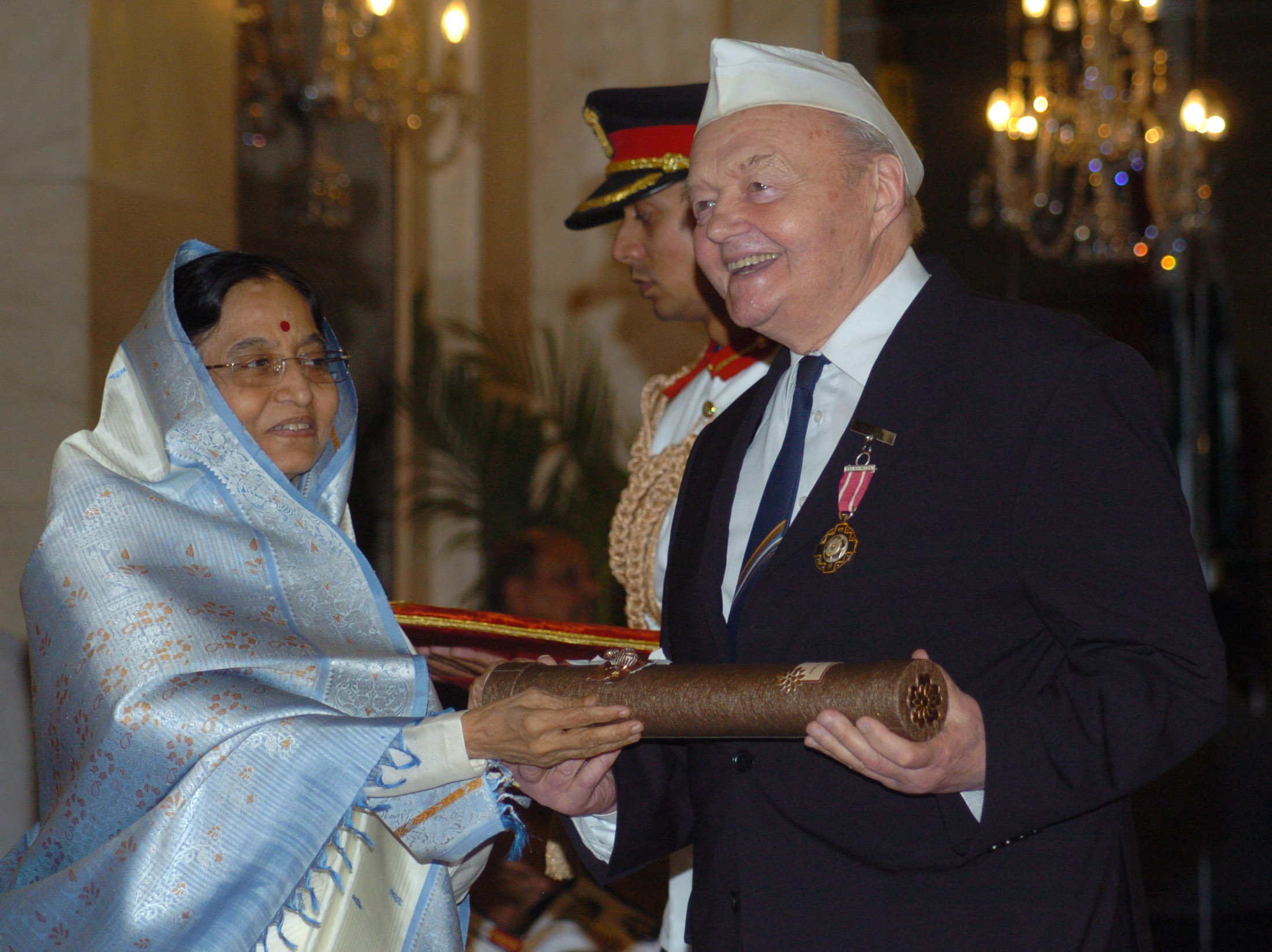
- Pechinkov receiving Padma Shri.
- Born: 8 September 1926; Moscow
- Died: 27 April 2018 (aged 91); Moscow
- Occupations: Actor; Director; Theatre personality
- Awards: Padma Shri

Gennadi Mikhailovich Pechinkov is a Russian actor, director and theatre personality, known for his portrayal of Rama. He played the part of the ancient Indian king from the epic, Ramayana, in 1960 at the Children's Theatre, Moscow and is reported to be the only European professional actor to have played the role in Europe. He continued playing the part for around 40 years and has performed in front many prominent Indian persons such as Jawaharlal Nehru and K. P. S. Menon. The Government of India awarded him the fourth highest civilian honour of the Padma Shri, in 2008, for his contributions to Theatre.

== See also ==
- Ramayana
