= Mahipal S. Sachdev =

Indian ophthalmologist

- Born: India
- Occupation: Ophthalmologist
- Known for: Phacoemulsification
- Spouse: Alka Sachdev
- Children: Two daughters
- Awards: Padma Shri; Rashtriya Gaurav Award; SAS Silver Medal
- Website: Doctor profile on Centre for Sight

Mahipal S. Sachdev is an Indian ophthalmologist and the Chairman of Centre for Sight, a chain of Eye Hospitals in India. He is known as one of the pioneers of the phacoemulsification procedure in India. He is the co-author of A Practical Guide to Phacoemulsification, the first Indian book on the topic. The Government of India awarded him the fourth highest civilian honour of the Padma Shri, in 2007, for his contributions to Indian medicine. He is the Chairman Scientific Committee of the Intraocular Implant and Refractive Society of India, IIRSI.

== Biography ==
Sachdev did his graduate studies in medicine at the All India Institute of Medical Sciences, Delhi and secured his post-graduation in ophthalmology from Dr. R.P. Centre for Ophthalmic Sciences, the apex institute of the Regional Institutes of Ophthalmology in India. In 1989, he received a fellowship and did advanced training on Cornea and Refractive surgery at Georgetown University, Washington DC and joined his alma mater, AIIMS, as a member of faculty where he worked until 1996. When Indraprastha Apollo Hospital opened in 1996, he joined the institution. Simultaneously, he modestly started an eye clinic at Safdarjang Enclave, which grew to become a chain of eye hospitals, starting to function under the brand name Centre for Sight, from 2002 onwards.

The Summit Autonomous Society of USA has recognized Sachdev as a refractive surgeon and a member of the organization. He serves the Indian Intraocular Implant and Refractive Society as the Chairman of its scientific committee and is the secretary of the Delhi Ophthalmological Society. He has also represented India at the Asian Refractive Council. American Society of Cataract and Refractive Surgery (ASCRS) has accredited his instruction course. He has performed live demonstrations, including the one performed at the Seattle conference of ASCRS. He has delivered several award lectures; Dr. (Col.) B. L. Taneja Memorial Guest Lecture Award at the 1996-97 Delhi State Medical Conference, Prof. L. P. Agarwal Lecture of AIIMS in 2005, and Dr A. D. Grover Memorial Oration of Chandigarh Ophthalmological Society are some of the notable ones among them.

Sachdev published A Practical Guide to Phacoemulsification, a textbook on phacoemulsification co-authored by Tanuj Dada in 2003, reportedly the first Indian book on the subject. He has also edited another book on the medical procedure titled Phacoemulsification. Besides, he has presented more than 150 papers and published over 100 articles, ResearchGate, an online repository, listing 47 of them. The Summit Autonomous Society of USA (SAS) awarded him the silver medal, in 1999, for successfully performing over 1000 LASIK procedures in one year. The Government of India awarded him the civilian honour of the Padma Shri in 2007. Two years later, he received the 2009 Rashtriya Gaurav Award from the Institute For Environment Yoga And Social Security, New Delhi.

Sachdev is married to Alka, a medical doctor, and the couple has two daughters, Ritika and Gitansha, who are both pursuing medical professions.
