= Aloysius Prakash Fernandez =

Indian economist and social worker

Padmashree Mr. Aloysius Prakash Fernandez
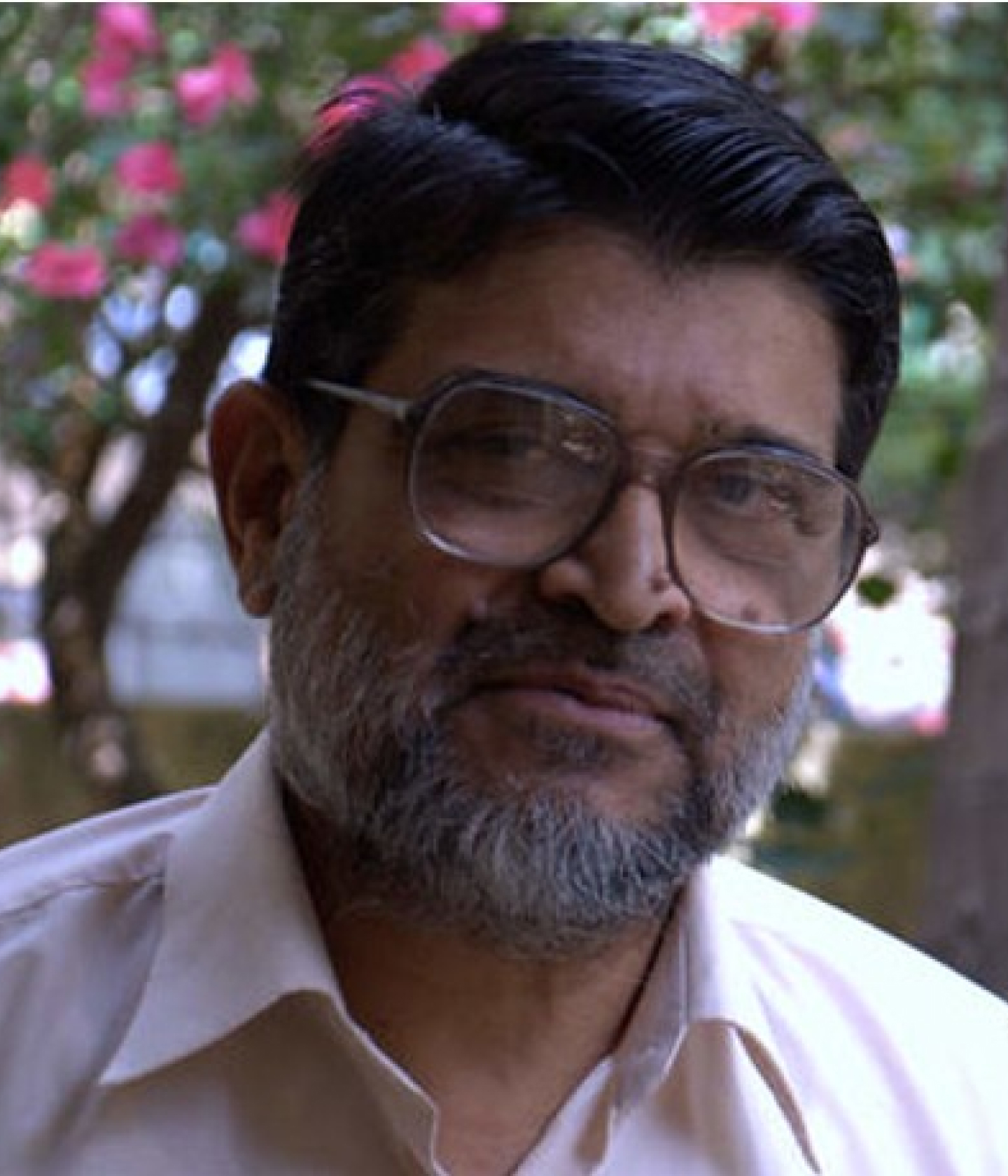
- Born: Karnataka, India
- Occupations: Economist, social worker
- Known for: Father of SHG Movement
- Awards: Padmashree; Caritas India Jubilee Award 2000; Sa-Dhan Lifetime Achievement Award 2025

Aloysius Prakash Fernandez known as Father of SHG Movement is an Indian economist, social worker and the First Chairman of the NABARD Financial Services Limited (NABFINS), a National Bank for Agriculture and Rural Development (NABARD) subsidiary, formed with the participation of several banks in India. Considered by many as a pioneer of Microfinance and Self Help Group concept in India, he was the executive director and is the member secretary of MYRADA, a non governmental organization working for the eradication of poverty, gender equality and social development.

Fernandez, born in Karnataka, secured a post graduate degree in arts from Central University of Karnataka and obtained advanced diplomas from the University of Louvain, Belgium on Sociology and Research Methodology and from Oxford University on Development Studies. His early career was with Caritas India and then abroad, with the World Bank and the Canadian International Development Agency before his return to Bengaluru in 1982. Besides holding the chair of NABFINS, he is the secretary of Myrada, executive director of The Myrada Davinson Training Centre and the Chairman of Sanghamithra Rural Financial Services. He is known to be a prolific writer and is credited with several publications. Fernandez was honored by the Government of India, in 2000, with the fourth highest Indian civilian award of Padma Shri. He also received the Caritas India Jubilee 2000 award the same year. At the 20th Sa-Dhan National Conference (13–14 November 2025 at New Delhi) on Inclusive Growth, he was recognized by the Secretary, Department of Financial Services (DFS), Government of India with the prestigious Lifetime Achievement Award for his outstanding contributions to Women's Empowerment and Financial inclusion.
