= Mohammed Tayab Khan =

Artist

Mohammed Tayab Khan is a noted craftsman from Rajasthan state in India. He was awarded Padma Shri award in 2001 by Government of India for his contribution. He hails from Jodhpur.
