= Prahlad Kumar Sethi =

Indian physician

- Born: October 14, 1939; India
- Died: March 24, 2026 (aged 86); New Delhi, India
- Occupation: Neurophysician
- Spouse: Dr. Shashi
- Children: 2
- Awards: Padma Shri; Vishisht Seva Medal

Prahlad Kumar Sethi was an Indian physician, medical writer and the chairman of the department of Neurology at Sir Ganga Ram Hospital, New Delhi. He is the founder of Brain Care Foundation, a Delhi-based Trust engaged in the spreading community awareness about brain diseases by dissemination of information. and the author of several publications on neurology and other medical topics, including Medical Second Opinion, a patient’s perspective on how, when and why a second opinion is necessary in medical matters. He is a recipient of the Vishisht Seva Medal for his services to the Indian Armed Forces. The Government of India awarded him the fourth highest civilian honour of the Padma Shri in 2002.
