= Jyoti Bhushan Banerji =

Indian physician and social worker

- Born: Allahabad, Uttar Pradesh, India
- Occupation: Physician
- Awards: Padma Shri

Jyoti Bhushan Banerji was an Indian physician, social worker and the founder of Jyoti Institute of Medical and Rehabilitation Sciences (JIMARS) from the Indian state of Allahabad. He founded the organization in 1971, and later registered it under the name, Viklang Kendra, in 1976, for the rehabilitation of physically disabled people. The organization was renamed again as JIMARS, in 2010, upon the death of Banerji. He was honored by the Government of India, in 2001, with the fourth highest Indian civilian award of Padma Shri.
