= Alaka Deshpande =

Indian medical doctor and social worker

Dr. Alaka Keshav Deshpande was an Indian physician and social worker known for her work towards AIDS patients. She was a faculty in the Department of Internal Medicine at Grant Medical College and JJ Hospital Mumbai and in 1990, started the first HIV OPD (Out Patient Department). She established and headed the Anti-Retroviral Therapy (ART) section from 2003-04 till 2011. She was noted to have not taken any salary for this tenure from the hospital. In 2001, she was presented with Padma Shri, India's 4th highest civilian honour. She died on December 30, 2025 after battling a critical illness.
