= Manzoor Ahtesham =

Indian writer of Hindi literature (1948–2021)

- Born: 3 April 1948; Bhopal, Madhya Pradesh, India
- Died: 26 April 2021 (aged 73); Bhopal, Madhya Pradesh, India
- Occupation: Writer
- Awards: Padma Shri; Bharatiya Bhasha Parishad Puruskar; Shrikant Verma Smriti Samman; Virsingh Deo Award; Vageshwari Award; Shikhar Samman; Pahal Samman

Manzoor Ahtesham (3 April 1948 – 26 April 2021) was an Indian writer of Hindi literature known for his depiction of the lives of the Indian Muslim community in independent India.

== Life ==
Manzoor Ahtesham was born on 3 April 1948 in Bhopal. He studied at Aligarh Muslim University and a predecessor of Maulana Azad National Institute of Technology.

He died on 26 April 2021 at a private hospital here after being admitted a week back for COVID-19 in Bhopal.

== Literary career ==
Ahtesham was the author of five novels and several short story anthologies and plays. His major works are:

- Kuch Din Aur (Novel - 1976)
- Sukha Bargad (Novel - 1986)
- Dastan-e Lapata (Novel - 1995)
- Basharat Manzil (Novel - 2004)
- Pahar Dhalte (Novel - 2007)
- Ramzan Mein Ek Maut (Short story anthology - 1982)
- Tasbeeh (Short story anthology - 1998)
- Tamasha Tatha Anya Kahaniyan (Short story anthology - 2001)
- Ek Tha Badshah (Play - 1980)

Sukha Bargad has been translated into English under the name, A Dying Banyan, by Kuldip Singh while Dastan E Lapata has been translated by Jason Grunebaum and Ulrike Stark under the title The Tale of the Missing Man. In 2007, New York magazine cited the book as one of the best novels not yet available in English. Grunebaum and Stark's translation was issued by Northwestern University Press in 2018.

== Awards ==
Ahtesham was a recipient of several awards such as Bharatiya Bhasha Parishad Puruskar, Shrikant Verma Smriti Samman, Virsingh Deo Award, Vageshwari Award, Shikhar Samman, Pahal Samman and Maithilee Sharan Gupt Award 2017–2018. He received the Padma Shri, the fourth-highest Indian civilian award, in 2003.
