= Nagarajan Vedachalam =

Indian space scientist

- Born: India
- Occupation: Space scientist
- Awards: Padma Shri
- Website: web site

Nagarajan Vedachalam is an Indian space scientist, K. R. Ramanathan Distinguished Professor of the Department of Space and distinguished scientist emeritus of Indian Space Research Organization, known for his contributions to Indian space programme. He is a former director of the Liquid Propulsion Systems Centre that developed the cryogenic engine of the Geosynchronous Satellite Launch Vehicle (GSLV) and is reported to have associated with over 100 space programmes of ISRO. He continues to sit in many committees of the Department of Space though officially retired from ISRO service as the director of ISRO Inertial Systems Unit (IISU) and holds several patents for his innovations.

Vedachalam, a recipient of the degree of Doctor of Science (Honoris Causa) from the Madurai Kamaraj University, was honoured by the Government of India in 2003 with Padma Shri, the fourth highest Indian civilian award.

== See also ==
- Department of Space
- Indian space programme
- Geosynchronous Satellite Launch Vehicle
- Indian Space Research Organization
- Liquid Propulsion Systems Centre
- ISRO Inertial Systems Unit
