= Bhagavatula Dattaguru =

Indian engineer and academic

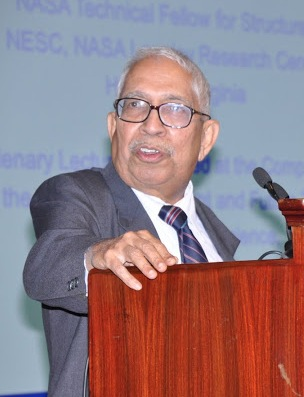
- Born: 1941 (age 84–85)
- Education: Andhra University (B.Sc.); Indian Institute of Science (B.Eng.)
- Occupations: Engineer and academic

Bhagavatula Dattaguru (born in 1942) is an Indian engineer and academic. He has received several awards, including the Padma Shri Award, India's fourth highest civilian honour in 2005 in the field of science and engineering.

== Education ==
Dattaguru had his school education at different board schools in the district where his father, Raghavendra Sastry, worked as a teacher and a headmaster. He has a long association with Andhra Loyola College (ALC), where he did his Intermediate (old scheme) and B.Sc. degree (Physics main) during 1955-57 and 1957-59 respectively. In his degree, he stood first and secured gold medal from Andhra University, to which Loyola College was then affiliated.

A great lover of science, Dattaguru moved to Bangalore for higher studies and joined the Indian Institute of Science (IISc). He went on to complete BE in electrical engineering during 1959-62 and ME in aerospace technology during 1962–64.

== Career as professor ==
Dattaguru continued his association with the IISc by joining its faculty in the aerospace engineering department in 1964. After receiving his PhD in 1973, he worked there as an assistant professor, associate professor and a professor, before retiring as chairman of the aerospace engineering department in June, 2004.

During his time at the IISc, Dattaguru worked with the space technology researchers, including the president, A.P.J. Abdul Kalam, Kota Harinarayana, Kasturi Rangan and R. Chidambaram. As a faculty, Dattaguru guided a number of research scholars. He visited the US, Australia, Hong Kong and several other countries as visiting professor.Dattaguru became an emeritus professor of the IISc after his retirement and now he is a visiting professor at Jain university, Bangalore.

== Positions held ==
- Chairman (1999-2003), Department of Aerospace Engineering, IISc
- Senior Resident Research Associate of National Research Council, (USA) at Fatigue and Fracture Branch of NASA Langley Research Center, Hampton, Virginia, USA (1980-1982)
- Chairman (1996-2000), Council for Scientific & Industrial Consultancy, IISc
- Coordinator (1987–91), Joint Advanced Technology program, IISc
- Coordinator (1993-2000) Member of ARDB Structures Panel
- President (2001-2003) Institute of Smart Materials, Structures and Systems
- President (2003–04), Advanced Computing and Communications Society
- Member of the governing board, RV-TIFAC Composite Design Center
- Vice president, Institute of Smart materials, Structures and Systems (ISSS).
- Member(1985–93), Co-ordinator (1993-2000), Aeronautics R&D Board, Structures Panel.
- Indian Representative, executive council of International Congress of Fracture (ICF) (1984–89).
- Associate editor, Journal of the Aeronautical Society of India, 1988
- Guest editor for three Special Issues of the Journal on Fracture Mechanics, published in honour of Prof. G.R. Irwin.
- Member, Working Group for Development of Fracture Control Plan on PSLV Programs, VSSC, Trivandrum.
- Member, Task team for Fracture Criterion in Design of Pressure Vessels/Rocket Motor Casings formed between VSSC, Trivandrum; NAL, Bangalore; and IISc, Bangalore.
- Member, Mission Advisory Committee, Advanced composites Mission, DST, New Delhi.
- Senior Associate, National Institute for Advanced Studies (NIAS), Bangalore.
- Visiting Scientist, Analytical Services Materials Inc., Hampton, Virginia, USA (1987)

== Awards and honours ==
- Sri Tamma Sambayya medal - Andhra University, Waltair, 1959
- Senior Resident Research Associateship of National Research Council (USA)
- Aerospace Gold Medal for best paper - Institution of Engineers, 1988
- Biren Roy Trust Award of the Aeronautical Society of India, 1993
- ARDB Silver Jubilee award for best sponsored research project, 1996.
- IISc Alumni Award: Prof. Rustom Choksi award for Excellence in Engineering Research
- DRDO Academic Excellence Award 2002
- Padma Shri Award for Science & Engineering for the year, Government of India, 2005
- Aero Society Awards: Excellence in Aerospace Education Biren Roy Trust Award
- Institution of Engineers: Gold Medal for best paper
- Distinguished Engineer, Recognised on 37th Engineers Day by the Institution of Engineers, 2004
- Lifetime Achievement Medal will be awarded by International Conference on Computational & Experimental Engineering & Sciences (ICCES), Changwon, Korea, 2014 for seminal contributions to damage tolerance methodologies and to education of generations of students in India
- Lifetime Service Award by Society of Indian Aerospace Technologies & Industries (SIATI), 2012 for the outstanding contributions in the field of Education and Research in Aerospace
- Award of Senior Scientist by the World Congress on Computational Mechanics (WCCM) and Asia Pacific Congress on Computational Mechanics (APCOM), Australia, 2010–11
