= Shaik Khader Noordeen =

Indian leprologist (1933-2021)

President, International Leprosy Association
- In office 2002–2008

President, Indian Association of Leprologists
- In office 2000–2002

Director, Action Programme for the Elimination of Leprosy, WHO
- In office 1994–1998

Personal details
- Born: 1 July 1933 Keeranur, Madras Presidency, British India
- Died: 17 August 2021 (aged 88) Chennai, Tamil Nadu, India
- Education: M.B.B.S., Stanley Medical College; D.P.H., All India Institute of Hygiene and Public Health; M.P.H., University of Michigan
- Occupation: leprologist
- Awards: International Gandhi Award; 1996; Padma Shri; 2009

Shaik Khader Noordeen (1933 – 17 August 2021) was an Indian leprologist from Chennai, India. He was the director of the WHO’s Action Programme for the Elimination of Leprosy from 1994 to 1998, and in recognition of his work, he was awarded the Padma Shri by the Government of India in 2009.

== Early life and education ==
Shaik Khader Noordeen was born in Keeranur, Madras Presidency on 1 July 1933. He pursued medical studies at Stanley Medical College, Madras, where he earned his M.B.B.S. degree. He specialised in public health, obtaining a Diploma in Public Health (D.P.H.) from the All India Institute of Hygiene and Public Health, Calcutta, and later a Master of Public Health (M.P.H.) from the University of Michigan, USA, in 1963.

== Career ==
=== Work in India (1958–1979) ===
Noordeen joined the Central Leprosy Teaching and Research Institute in Chengalpattu, Tamil Nadu, in 1958. Over the course of two decades, he held several key positions, including Medical Officer, Assistant Director, and Deputy Director. At CLTRI, he conducted research in epidemiology, clinical leprosy, prevention, and rehabilitation, collaborating with noted experts like Dr. Hariharan Srinivasan.

=== Contributions at WHO (1979–1998) ===
In 1979, Noordeen joined the World Health Organization in Geneva, initially serving as a Medical Officer and later as the Chief Medical Officer of the Leprosy Unit. He played an important role in adopting World Health Assembly Resolution 44.9 in 1991, which set the ambitious goal of eliminating leprosy as a public health problem by 2000. Later, he became the director of WHO Action Programme for the Elimination of Leprosy (1994–1998). As director, he led the global implementation of multi-drug therapy (MDT) for leprosy elimination and also led efforts to provide free MDT through large-scale pharmaceutical donations, ensuring treatment reached millions.

=== Post-retirement ===
After retiring from WHO, Noordeen continued to contribute to leprosy elimination:

- President, Indian Association of Leprologists (2000–2002)
- President, International Leprosy Association (2002–2008)
- Editor, Indian Journal of Leprosy (2001–2007)

He was also a Founding Trustee and Chair of the Sasakawa-India Leprosy Foundation and a member of the Technical Resource Group of India’s National Leprosy Eradication Program.

== Awards ==
Noordeen received numerous awards for his contributions, including:

- International Gandhi Award (1996)
- Padma Shri (2009)

== Legacy ==
Noordeen died on 17 August 2021 in Chennai, Tamil Nadu. In January 2023, a book titled Dr. S K Noordeen: Architect of the Global Leprosy Elimination Program was published, highlighting his life and work. The book was authored by Dr. Derek Lobo, a trustee of the Sasakawa India Leprosy Foundation (S-ILF).
