= Piloo Nowshir Jungalwalla =

Indian educationist

- Born: Delhi, India
- Occupation: Educationist
- Awards: Padma Shri

Piloo Nowshir Jungalwalla, née Piloo Nanavaty, is an Indian Parsi educationist from Delhi and a member of the Executive council of Parzor Foundation, The UNESCO Parsi Zoroastrian Project. A former member of faculty of Wilson College, Mumbai, she was married to Nowshir Jungalwalla, a renowned gynecologist and a Fellow of the Royal College of Physicians of London. She retired from service as the principal of the Memorial College, University of Delhi. She was honored by the Government of India, in 2000, with the fourth highest Indian civilian award of Padma Shri.
