= Maisnam Amubi Singh =

Indian classical dancer

- Born: Manipur, India
- Occupation: Classical dancer
- Known for: Manipuri dance
- Awards: Padma Shri; Sangeet Natak Akademi Award

Maisnam Amubi Singh was an exponent of the Indian classical dance form of Manipuri, and the founding supervisor of the Jawaharlal Nehru Manipuri Dance Academy. Singh, who was credited with pioneering solo dance in Manipuri, was the first winner of Sangeet Natak Akademi award from the state of Manipur which he won in 1956. He was honoured by the Government of India in 1970 with Padma Shri, the fourth highest Indian civilian award.

== See also ==
- Manipuri dance
