= Tony Fernandez (ophthalmologist) =

Indian ophthalmologist

- Born: Kerala, India
- Occupation: Ophthalmologist
- Known for: Ophthalmology
- Awards: Padma Shri
- Website: Website

Tony Fernandez is an Indian ophthalmologist, noted for his contributions in founding and fostering an eye care centre at Little Flower Hospital, Angamaly, thereby elevating the hospital from the level of a medical dispensary into an 800-bedded hospital. He founded the first eye bank in the private sector in Kerala and is a former president of the All India Ophthalmological Society. He has delivered many award orations including the Dr Sriniavasa Rao Memorial Oration Award (1995) of the Karnataka Ophthalmic Society and has initiated a social project, Kazhcha-Vision 2020, in association with South Indian film actor, Mammootty, for providing free cataract treatment to financially compromised people of Kerala. The Government of India awarded him the fourth highest civilian honour of the Padma Shri, in 2008, for his contributions to medicine. Kerala Society of Ophthalmic Surgeons have instituted an award, Padmasree Dr. Tony Fernandez Award, in his honour, awarded annually to the best video on ophthalmology.

== See also ==
- Little Flower Hospital
