= List of Meitei people =

The following is a list of prominent people belonging to the Meitei people.

== Academicians ==
- Rakhesh Singh Kshetrimayum

== Activists ==
- Binalakshmi Nepram
- Irom Chanu Sharmila
- Licypriya Kangujam

== Actors ==
- Abenao Elangbam
- Bala Hijam
- Bijou Thaangjam
- Biju Ningombam
- Bonium Thokchom
- Chinglen Thiyam
- Danube Kangjam
- Denny Likmabam
- Devita Urikhinbam
- Diya Khwairakpam
- Gokul Athokpam
- Gurumayum Bonny
- Hamom Sadananda
- Huirem Seema
- Kamala Saikhom
- Khwairakpam Bishwamittra
- Kshetrimayum Rashi
- Ithoi Oinam
- Iboyaima Khuman
- Kaiku Rajkumar
- Kangabam Tomba
- Lairenjam Olen
- Laishram Lalitabi
- Leishangthem Tonthoingambi Devi
- Lin Laishram
- Manda Leima
- Maya Choudhury
- Priyakanta Laishram
- Rajkumari Hemabati
- Raju Nong
- Silheiba Ningthoujam
- Soma Laishram
- Suraj Ngashepam
- Thongam Thoithoi
- Thoudam Ongbi Modhubala
- Yengkhom Roma

== Athletes ==
- Bombayla Devi Laishram, Archery, Padma Shri, Arjuna Award
- Dingko Singh, Boxing, Padma Shri, Asian Games Medallist
- Kunjarani Devi, Weightlifting, Padma Shri, Khel Ratna, Commonwealth Games Medallist
- Laishram Sarita Devi, Boxing, Asian Games Medallist
- Ningthoujam Pritam Singh, Football
- Saikhom Mirabai Chanu, Weightlifting, Olympic Medallist

== Dancers ==
- Elam Endira Devi, Padma Shri
- Haobam Ongbi Ngangbi Devi, Padma shri
- Rajkumar Achouba Singh
- Kshetrimayum Ongbi Thouranisabi Devi

== Fashion Designers ==
- Robert Naorem

== Filmmakers ==
- Aribam Syam Sharma
- Bobby Wahengbam
- Bobo Khuraijam
- Diya Khwairakpam
- Haobam Paban Kumar
- Khwairakpam Bishwamittra
- Makhonmani Mongsaba
- Meena Longjam
- Oinam Gautam Singh
- Oken Amakcham
- Romi Meitei

== Physicians ==
- Laishram Nabakishore Singh, Padma Shri

== Politicians ==
- Mairembam Koireng Singh
- Keisham Meghachandra Singh
- Bimol Akoijam
- N Biren Singh
- Okram Ibobi Singh
- Radhabinod Koijam
- Rajkumar Dorendra Singh
- Rajkumar Imo Singh
- Rajkumar Jaichandra Singh
- Rajkumar Ranbir Singh
- Wahengbam Nipamacha Singh

== Royalty ==
- Leishemba Sanajaoba

== Spiritual Leaders ==
- Bhaktisvarupa Damodar Swami

== Theatre & Film Artists ==
- Aribam Syam Sharma, Padma Shri
- Heisnam Kanhailal
- Khwairakpam Bishwamittra
- Makhonmani Mongsaba
- Ratan Thiyam, Theatre, Padma Shri
- Sabitri Heisnam
- Shougrakpam Hemanta

== Writers & Scholars ==
- Atombapu Sharma
- Chingsubam Akaba
- Kulamani Thingbaijam
- Ningthoukhongjam Khelchandra
- M. K. Binodini Devi
- Moirangthem Inao
- Moirangthem Kirti Singh
- Priyakanta Laishram
- Rajkumar Jhalajit Singh
- Rajkumar Shitaljit Singh
- Khwairakpam Chaoba
- Hijam Anganghal
- Lamabam Kamal

== See also ==
- List of people by nationality
