= List of Meitei-language films of 2018 =

This is a list of films in Meitei language (officially known as Manipuri) released in 2018, certified by Central Board of Film Certification (CBFC).

Some of them made entries in the prestigious national and international film festivals of 2018 and 2019 and had won awards. Magi Matambakta and Laman Ama are such films.

== January–March ==
Certification date		Title	Director	Cast	Studio (Production house)	Ref.
J A N	8	Aruba Echel	Oinam Gautam Singh	Silheiba Ningthoujam; Jeenita Singha; Sunny Naoshekpam	Khunailon Films	
M A R	28	Monna Sengao Lakpa	Gyanand	Pilot; Jeet; Tenzing; Rajkidsun; Kamcha; Aku; Jamz Saikhom	Dreams Production	

== April–June ==
Certification date		Title	Director	Cast	Studio (Production house)	Ref.
M A Y	02	Amuktang Ga Haikho	Romi Meitei	Kaiku Rajkumar; Deviya Chingtham; Sushmita Mangsatabam; Hamom Sadananda	Ebudhou Marjing Films	
M A Y	17	Chagatnaba Crazy Friends	Bimol Phibou	Gurumayum Bonny; Surjit Saikhom; Ratan Lai; Ibomcha; Prem Sharma	D.V.S. Films	
M A Y	19	Eina Fagi Touraga	Ajit Ningthouja	Gurumayum Bonny; Biju Ningombam	Mami Mahum Films	
M A Y	19	Nungshibi Imphal	IS Gurung	Silheiba Ningthoujam; Gepelina Mayanglambam; Ratan Lai	GI Films	

== July–September ==
Certification date		Title	Director	Cast	Studio (Production house)	Ref.
A U G	08	Meerem	Amar Raj	Kaiku Rajkumar; Ranju; Dayananda	100 Movies Productions	
A U G	08	Laija	Ojitbabu Ningthoujam	Silheiba Ningthoujam; Sushmita Mangsatabam; Moirangthem Sunil Myboy	MPS Films	
A U G	14	Maram Chanu	Bijgupta Laishram	Gokul Athokpam; Nongthanganbi Takhelmayum; Redy Yumnam; Omolata	Khana Chaoba Ibudhou Wangbren Films	
A U G	14	Taibang Keithel	Satyajit BK	Khwairakpam Bishwamittra; Idhou; Gurumayum Priyogopal; Bobo Ningthoukhongjam	Soraren Films	
A U G	14	Laman Ama	Sanad Aribam	Saroja Devi Chongtham; Raju Nong; Hemlet Tonjam	Fast Forward Films	
A U G	20	Aliyah	Yoimayai Mongsaba	Gurumayum Bonny; Artina Thoudam; Surjit Saikhom; Billa Ngathem	Evening Star Films	
A U G	27	Magi Matambakta	Makhonmani Mongsaba	Lamjingba; Aryan; Khaidem Anita; Idhou; L. Prakash	Bravura Films	
S E P T	26	Chingda Satpi Engellei	Bobby Haobam	Hamom Sadananda; Leishangthem Tonthoingambi Devi; Sonia Hijam; Araba Laitonjam; Biju Ningombam; Sunny Naoshekpam; Maxina Paonam	Lakhshmi Narayan Films	
S E P T	26	Yotpi	Romi Meitei	James Keisham; Bala Hijam; Soma Laishram	JnD Moving Pictures	
S E P T	27	Chanu IPS	Sanaton Nongthomba	Gokul Athokpam; Soma Laishram; Bala Hijam	Nongthombam Films	
S E P T	28	Manja Nangbu	Eepu	Thoiba Khaidem; Romeo Mangang; Nicky Sorokhaibam	Eeraba Pictures	
S E P T	29	Pari Imom	Bijgupta Laishram	Chitra Pangambam; Arun Yumnam; Gokul Athokpam; Bala Hijam	Chitra Cine Pix	

== October–December ==
Certification date		Title	Director	Cast	Studio (Production house)	Ref.
O C T	02	Awunpot	Santikumar Thounaojam	Gurumayum Bonny; Nicky Sorokhaibam	BHS Films	
O C T	30	Leikai Lallumba 2	Ojitbabu Ningthoujam	Silheiba Ningthoujam; Sonia Samjetsabam	Manira Movies	
O C T	31	Khurai Angaobi	Sudhir Kangjam	Gokul Athokpam; Soma Laishram; Hamom Sadananda; Biju Ningombam	Sairem Art Creations	
O C T	31	Taningdre	Chan Heisnam	Khaba; Bila Ngathem; Reshmi Sorokhaibam	Bright Film Manipur	
D E C	04	Leichilda Pallaba Thaja	Pilu H.	Hamom Sadananda; Soma Laishram; Bonium Thokchom; Sushmita Mangsatabam	Pilu Films	
D E C	05	MoU (Memorandum of Understanding)	Chou-En-Lai	Gurumayum Bonny; Biju Ningombam; Khaba; Gepelina Mayanglambam	GN Entertainment	
D E C	07	Meitan Araba	Lukanand Kshetrimayum	Brahmacharimayum Dishiraj; Avi Khundrakpam	Rajkumari Kamalasana Films	
D E C	10	Hey Ishei	Oken Amakcham	Khaba; Nicky Sorokhaibam; Ratan Laishram; Oken Amakcham	KDS Films	
D E C	24	Won Nam (Scent of a Flower)	Maipaksana Haorongbam	Amos Yaknao Lungshung; Tonthoi Leishangthem	Mayong-Pasi Arts	
D E C	26	Palem Ema	Oinam Samananda Meitei	Kaiku Rajkumar; Soma Laishram; Ratan Lai; Samananda	Kanglei Movies World	
D E C	28	Kao Phaaba	Ishomani Khumbongmayum	Gokul Athokpam; Soma Laishram; Bala Hijam; Naopa Ngangom	Bimik Films	
D E C	28	Ei Lakkhini	Hemjeet Nongmaithem	Manda Leima; Thiyam Ronath; Prakash Soraisam	Nongmai-Ching Pictures	
D E C	29	Jomna Tour Chatpa	Chajing Deben	Nicky Sorokhaibam; Bobon; Happyson; Chajing Deben	Ema Sana Cine Lab	
D E C	31	Yumleima	Bijgupta Laishram	Gokul Athokpam; Neera Urikhinbam; Araba Laitonjam; Biju Ningombam	Neera Arts	
