= Lists of people by nationality =

This is a list of notable persons by nationality.

== By nationality ==
Delineating notable nationals of nation-states, and their significant dependent territories.

- Afghans
- Albanians
- Algerians
- Americans
- Andorrans
- Angolans
- Antiguans and Barbudans
- Argentines
- Armenians
- Arubans
- Australians
- Austrians
- Azerbaijanis
- Bahamians
- Bahrainis
- Bangladeshis
- Barbadians
- Bashkirs
- Belarusians
- Belizeans
- Beninese
- Bermudians
- Bhutanese
- Bolivians
- Bosniaks
- Bosnians and Herzegovinians
- Botswana
- Brazilians
- British
- British Virgin Islanders
- Bruneians
- Bulgarians
  - Macedonian Bulgarians
- Burkinabés
- Burundians
- Cambodians
- Cameroonians
- Canadians
- Cape Verdeans
- Caymanians
- Chadians
- Chileans
- Chinese
- Colombians
- Comorians
- Congolese (DRC)
- Congolese (RotC)
- Cook Islanders
- Cornish
- Costa Ricans
- Croats
- Cubans
- Curaçaoans
- Cypriots
- Czechs
- Danes
- Djiboutians
- Dominicans (Commonwealth)
- Dominicans (Republic)
- Dutch
- East Timorese
- Ecuadorians
- Egyptians
- Emiratis
- English
- Eritreans
- Estonians
- Ethiopians
- Falkland Islanders
- Faroese
- Fijians
- Finns
- Finnish Swedish
- Filipinos
- French citizens
- Gabonese
- Georgians
- Germans
  - Baltic Germans
- Ghanaians
- Gibraltarians
- Greeks
  - Greek Macedonians
- Greenlanders
- Grenadians
- Guamanians
- Guatemalans
- Guernsey
- Guianese (French)
- Guineans
- Guinea-Bissau nationals
- Guyanese
- Haitians
- Hondurans
- Hong Kongers
- Hungarians
- Icelanders
- Indians
- Indonesians
- Iranians
- Iraqis
- Irish
- Israelis
- Italians
- Ivoirians
- Jamaicans
- Japanese
- Jersey
- Jordanians
- Kazakhs
- Kenyans
- Kosovars
- Kuwaitis
- Kyrgyzs
- Lao
- Latvians
- Lebanese
- Liberians
- Libyans
- Liechtensteiners
- Lithuanians
- Luxembourgers
- Macedonians
- Malagasy
- Malawians
- Malaysians
- Maldivians
- Malians
- Maltese
- Manx
- Mauritians
- Mexicans
- Moldovans
- Mongolians
- Montenegrins
- Moroccans
- Mozambicans
- Namibians
- Nepalese
- New Zealanders
- Nicaraguans
- Nigeriens
- Nigerians
- Norwegians
- Omani
- Ossetians
- Pakistanis
- Palauans
- Palestinians
- Panamanians
- Papua New Guineans
- Paraguayans
- Peruvians
- Poles
- Portuguese
- Puerto Ricans
- Quebecers
- Réunionnais
- Romanians
- Russians
  - Baltic Russians
- Rwandans
- Saint Lucians
- Salvadorans
- Samoans
- São Tomé and Príncipe
- Scots
- Senegalese
- Serbs
- Seychellois
- Sierra Leoneans
- Singaporeans
- Slovaks
- Slovenes
- Somalis
- Somalilanders
- Sotho
- South Africans
- Spaniards
- Sri Lankans
- Sudanese
- Surinamese
- Swedes
- Swiss
- Syrians
- Taiwanese
- Tamils
- Tajik
- Tanzanians
- Thais
- Tibetans
- Tobagonians
- Togolese
- Trinidadians
- Tunisians
- Turks
- Tuvaluans
- Ugandans
- Ukrainians
- United States Virgin Islanders
- Uruguayans
- Uzbeks
- Vanuatuans
- Venezuelans
- Vietnamese
- Welsh
- Yemenis
- Zambians
- Zimbabweans

Excluding those ethnicities represented above, delineating notable according to their ethnic origin, e.g., Hispanics. For further information on appropriate categorisation, please refer to the discussion page.

- Afrikaners
- Akans
- Angamis
- Aromanians
- Assyrians
- Basques
- Bengalis
- Berbers
- Boers
- Bretons
- Buryats
- Cajuns
- Catalans
- Chakma
- Corsicans
- Chuvash
- Galicians
- Han Chinese
- Hausas
- Hispanic and Latino Americans
- Hutus
- Igbos
- Indigenous Australians
- Indigenous people of the Americas
  - First Nations
  - Huaorani people
  - Inuit
    - American Inuit
    - Canadian Inuit
    - Greenlandic Inuit
  - Métis
  - Native Americans
- Jews
- Karelians
- Karen
- Kodavas
- Kurds
- Macedonians
- Malays
- Meitei
- Moravians
- Nagas
- Native Hawaiians
- Punjabis
- Roma
- Samis
- Silesians
- Sindhis
- Sorbs
- Syriacs
- Tamils
- Tatars
- Tutsis
- Uyghurs
- Xhosas
- Yorubas
- Zo
- Zulus

== By location ==
Lists of notables by geographic birth location, not by ethnicity or national birth location.

- Latin Americans
- Born at sea

== By language ==
Delineating notables according to their language, e.g., Hebrew speakers, Anglophones.

- Esperanto speakers
- English-speaking Quebecers

== By occupation ==
- Lists of writers by ethnicity or nationality
- Lists of actors

== Born within the nations included in organizations of nations ==
- By African Union state

== See also ==
- List of adjectival and demonymic forms of place names
- List of adjectival and demonymic forms for countries and nations
- List of sovereign states
- List of contemporary ethnic groups
- List of indigenous peoples
- List of people of Tani descent
