= Kshetrimayum =

Kshetrimayum (shortly known as Kshetri) is a Meitei ethnic family name (surname). It is a Meitei yumnak. Its literal meaning is “House of Kshatriya”. This surname was given to the descendants of Hindu Kshatriyas, coming from outside Manipur and who first started settling down in Manipur during the reign of king Chalamba (1545 to 1562 A.D.) and king Gambhir (1825-1834 A.D.). They were originally Brahmakshatriya from north-eastern part of Karnataka and western Orissa, some of these people migrated to Manipur in the above said time, subsequently settled and got absorbed into Meitei society. This surname does not belong to any Yek Salais (seven clans of Meitei yumnak) since Yek Salais were already formed during the reign of Pakhangba well before their arrival in Manipur. Notable people with this family name are:

- Kshetri Irabot Singh, Indian politician
- Kshetrimayum Rashi, Indian actress
- Kshetrimayum Ongbi Thouranisabi Devi, Indian classical dancer
- Kshetrimayum Biren Singh, Indian politician
- Kshetrimayum Indira Devi, Indian social activist
- Kshetrimayum Thoiba Singh, Indian field hockey player
- Lukanand Kshetrimayum, Indian actor, model and filmmaker
- Rakhesh Singh Kshetrimayum, Indian electrical engineer, educator and Professor
