= List of East Timorese people =

The following is a list of notable East Timorese people:

- Marí Alkatiri
- Maria Domingas Alves (born 1959), women's rights activist
- Francisco Xavier do Amaral
- Norberto Do Amaral
- Aliança de Araújo (born 1952), politician
- Aicha Bassarewan, politician
- Carlos Felipe Ximenes Belo
- Madalena Boavida, politician
- Rosa Bonaparte (born 1975), politician and women's rights activist
- Maria Ângela Carrascalão (born 1951), writer and former minister
- Avelino Coelho
- Ilda Conceição (born 1957), politician
- Rosária Corte-Real, politician and former minister
- Maria de Lourdes Martins Cruz (born 1962), Roman Catholic missionary
- Alberto Ricardo da Silva
- Fernando de Araújo
- Rosa Garcia, journalist
- Xanana Gusmão
- Eurico Guterres
- Francisco Guterres
- Hamis Hatta
- Nicolau dos Reis Lobato
- Martinho da Costa Lopes
- Manuel Magalhaes de Oliveira, resistance leader
- Olinda Morais (born 1951), politician
- Basilio do Nascimento
- Anna Pessoa Pinto (born 1956), politician
- José Ramos-Horta
- Alfredo Reinado
- Taur Matan Ruak
- Kirsty Sword Gusmão (born 1966), first lady
- Fernando Sylvan
- Gil da Cruz Trindade
- Maria Terezinha Viegas (born 1964), politician
- Aurora Ximenes (born 1955), politician
