= Kshetri =

Kshetri may refer to:

- Chhetri, an ethnic group in Nepal
- Kshetrimayum, a Meitei ethnic surname

== See also ==
- Khatri Chhetri or KC, a subcaste of the Chhetris
- Khatri, a caste from Punjab in India (unrelated to the Chhetri)
- Khatri (surname), an Indian surname
- Kshatriya, traditional ruling caste in Hindu society
