= Olinde =

Olinde is both a given name and a surname. Notable people with the name include:

- Olinde Rodrigues (1795–1851), French banker and social reformer
- Louis Olinde (born 1998), German basketball player
- Wilbert Olinde (born 1955), American-German basketball player

== Other use ==
- Olinde was a cover name used during the deployment of the ironclad CSS Stonewall.

== See also ==
- Olinda (disambiguation)
