= Manipuri Hindus =

Manipuri Hindus or Hindu Manipuris may refer to:

- Meitei Hindus, the predominant Hindu community of Manipur
  - Manipuri Brahmins, Meitei speaking Brahmins of Manipur
- any other Hindus in Manipur
