= Thabaton (film series) =

Meitei language film series

- Directed by: Bijgupta Laishram
- Written by: Bijgupta Laishram
- Screenplay by: Bijgupta Laishram
- Story by: Bijgupta Laishram
- Produced by: Surjitkanta Ningthoukhongjam
- Starring: Sushmita Mangshatabam; Gokul Athokpam; Kaiku Rajkumar; Bala Hijam; Biju Ningombam
- Production company: BB Films Production (Big Brother's Films Productions)
- Country: India
- Language: Meitei language (officially called Manipuri language)

Thabaton is an Indian Meitei language film series directed by Bijgupta Laishram and produced by Surjitkanta Ningthoukhongjam, under the banners of BB Films Production. The series consists of Thabaton 1 (2013), Thabaton 2 (2014), Thabaton 3 (2019), Thabaton 4 and Thabaton 5. (Note: Thabaton 4 and Thabaton 5 are still unreleased as of 2022.) Besides the romantic affairs, it is about the story of the struggle of women, against gender based discrimination, domestic violence, in the society to get their due rights. It is produced in the digital feature film format.

== Plot ==
=== Thabaton 1 ===
Thabaton, a girl, eloped with her lover, Yaima. This resulted in conflict between their families, which even caused the murder of family members. However, Thaba and Yaima never separated. In retaliation for the loss of her sons, Yaima's mother sent Yaima away to study, and tortured the pregnant Thaba in his absence. Shortly after giving birth, Thaba was forced to leave the house and was told a lie that Yaima had died in a plane crash. Meanwhile, Yaima was told by his parents that Thaba had left home of her own accord because she didn't want to live with them. Unaware of the conspiracy, Thaba married another man and lived a peaceful life. Later, she discovered that her former husband was still alive. When she met Yaima again to explain everything, her second husband saw her and became suspicious. Despite the difficulties, Thaba managed to clear up the misunderstandings with both men. Ultimately, Thaba lived with her second husband and their child.

=== Thabaton 2 ===
The first topic covered in the second part is Yaima's adjustment to being apart from Thaba. In an effort to find peace, she made the decision to start a farm in a rural area. There, she met Nungshithoi, a young, playful girl. They both experienced romantic love. There were some disputes once Nungshithoi learned that Yaima had been married before, but these were resolved when Yaima proved his love for her and they got married. Meanwhile, Thaba is happily living with her second husband, her mother-in-law and her daughter. They stood strong and stayed together, despite attempts by strangers to tear their family apart with negativity.

However, when everything seemed to be going smoothly, Yaima's parents decided to file a lawsuit against Thaba and her second husband in an effort to obtain custody of their daughter from their previous marriage. This led to a lot of conflict between the two families. Yaima was unaware of this until Thaba called him in a state of distress and told him everything. Yaima arrived at the courthouse during the trial and returned his daughter to Thaba and her husband. Yaima's second wife eventually persuaded him to reconcile with his parents. The film ends with the announcement that Thaba is expecting a child with her second husband.

=== Thabaton 3 ===
The third part starts when Thaba's second husband passes away and her children have grown up. Her daughter has since gone on to become a doctor. Thaba is currently employed by the Department of Education, where she regularly comes into contact with the director, who looks at her in a very filthy and intimate way. The daughter of Yaima and Nungshithoi is the same age as Thaba's son. Neither family knew that Thaba's son and Yaima's daughter were dating. Thaba and Yaima were brought together by circumstance, and it was then that they discovered their children's relationship. Given their past, Thaba and Yaima were both adamantly opposed to their children getting together. Despite Yaima's objections, Nungshithoi and her mother supported the two youngsters when they rebelled.

Yaima's mother found out that the doctor was actually their grandchild from Yaima and Thaba's first marriage, after Yaima's father was admitted to the hospital where Thaba's daughter worked. This caused friction between the two families, which was quickly resolved when Yaima's mother apologised again for her behaviour.

When Thaba's director suspended her, she got her son to help her reinstate the suspension, thus exacting revenge on the director. She even received a promotion to director after disclosing the director's wrongdoings. The director and his men were enraged and attempted to harm Thaba and her family. There had been unresolved clashes and arguments in the past between the director's men and Thaba's son regarding Yaima and Nungshithoi's daughter. During the fight, the boyfriend of Thaba's daughter stabbed one of the men. However, Thaba's son wanted to take the blame for the killing and persuaded his sister and her boyfriend to flee. The police detained Thaba's son.

== Cast ==
- Sushmita Mangshatabam as Thaba
- Gokul Athokpam as Thaba's second husband
- Kaiku Rajkumar as Thaba's first husband, Yaima
- Bala Hijam as Nungshithoi
- Biju Ningombam as Thaba's daughter

== Production ==
Thabaton, Thabaton 2, and Thabaton 3 were produced by Surjitkanta Ningthoukhongjam under the banner of BB Films Production and directed by Bijgupta Laishram of Sagolband Tera Sadokpam Leikai. Bijgupta Laishram is also the story writer and the screenplay writer of the movie.

== Legal battle ==
Thabaton's producer Surjitkanta Ningthoukhongjam, who possessed certificates of the first three-film series, issued by the Government of India's Central Board of Film Certification, filed an application under order 39 Rule 1, 2 and 3 of CPC, 1908 read with section 60 of Copyright Act, 1957 to issue the "restraining order" against the Yaipha Thouni Thouram ceremony of Thabaton 4 and Thabaton 5, which was planned be held on 26 March 2021 by other groups of people, under the banner of the "Mapari Arts Production, Khuman Pokpa" without the former producer's knowledge or consent. He claimed the very action to be the violation of the provisions of Copyright Act, 1957 (Copyright law of India).

== See also ==
- Nangna Nokpa Yengningi
- Amukta Ani
- Keibu Keioiba (film)
