= Sagolband Assembly constituency =

Legislative Assembly constituency in Manipur State, India

Coordinates: 24.8°N 93.92°E

Sagolband
- Constituency for the Manipur Legislative Assembly

Constituency details
- Country: India
- Region: Northeast India
- State: Manipur
- District: Imphal West
- Lok Sabha constituency: Inner Manipur
- Established: 1967
- Total electors: 24,019
- Reservation: None

Member of Legislative Assembly
- 12th Manipur Legislative Assembly
- Incumbent Rajkumar Imo Singh
- Party: Bharatiya Janata Party
- Elected year: 2022

Sagolband Legislative Assembly constituency is one of the 60 Legislative Assembly constituencies of Manipur state in India.

It is part of Imphal West district.

== Extent ==
Sagolband is the 11th among the 60 assembly constituencies of Manipur. It has 36 parts namely: 1 - Sagolband Tera Amudon (A), 2 - Sagolband Tera Amudon (B), 3 - Bijoy Govinda (A), 4 - Bijoy Govinda (B), 5 - Thangjam Leikai, 6 - Ingudam Leikai, 7 - Sagolband Thingom Leikai, 8 - Sayang Pukhri Mapal, 9 - Thounaojam Leikai, 10 - Kwakeithel Thounaojam Leikai, 11 - Sagolband Takhellambam Leikai (A), 12 - Sagolband Takhellambam Leikai (B), 13 - Leimakhujam Leikai, 14 - Soibam Leikai, 15 - Sagolband Kangabam Leikai (A), 16 - Sagolband Kangabam Leikai (B), 17 - Keishampat Thokchom Leikai, 18 - Moirang Leirak, 19 - Nepra Manjor Leikai, 20 - Sagolband Moirang Leirak, 21 - Mabudhou Mantri Leikai, 22 - Sagolband Meino Leirak, 23 - Maisnam Leikai, 24 - Sagolband Salam Leikai (A), 25 - Sagolband Salam Leikai (B), 26 - Wahengbam Leikai (A), 27 - Wahengbam Leikai (B), 28 - Paona Bazar (A), 29 - Paona Bazar (B), 30 - Paona Bazar (C), 31 - Kakhulong(A), 32 - Kakhulong (B), 33 - Old Lambulane (A), 34 - Old Lambulane (B), 35 - Keisamthong Kabui Khul, and 36 - Yaiskul Police Lane.

== Members of the Legislative Assembly ==
Year	Member	Party
2007	Khwairakpam Loken Singh	Indian National Congress
2012	Rajkumar Imo Singh	Manipur State Congress Party
2017	Rajkumar Imo Singh	Indian National Congress
2022	Rajkumar Imo Singh	Bharatiya Janata Party

== Election results ==
Vote share of winning candidates
2022	54.60%
2017	47.07%
2012	50.56%
2007	51.23%
2002	34.31%
2000	32.71%
1995	33.69%
1990	50.26%
1984	22.70%
1980	19.02%
1974	38.24%
1972	42.21%
1967	52.00%

=== 2027 Assembly election ===
2027 Manipur Legislative Assembly election: Sagolband
Party	Candidate	Votes	%	±%
INC				
NDA				
NOTA	None of the above			
Majority				
Turnout				
gain from		Swing		

=== Assembly Election 2022 ===
2022 Manipur Legislative Assembly election: Sagolband
Party	Candidate	Votes	%	±%
BJP	Rajkumar Imo Singh	11,054	54.60%	7.63%
JD(U)	Dr. Khwairakpam Loken Singh	8,398	41.48%	
INC	Moirangthem Momo Singh	564	2.79%	−44.29%
NOTA	Nota	228	1.13%	0.35%
Margin of victory		2,656	13.12%	13.02%
Turnout		20,244	84.28%	−0.55%
Registered electors		24,019		4.14%
BJP gain from INC		Swing	7.53%	

=== Assembly Election 2017 ===
2017 Manipur Legislative Assembly election: Sagolband
Party	Candidate	Votes	%	±%
INC	Rajkumar Imo Singh	9,211	47.07%	−1.17%
BJP	Dr. Khwairakpam Loken Singh	9,192	46.98%	
NPP	G. Satyabati Devi	982	5.02%	
NOTA	None of the Above	151	0.77%	
Margin of victory		19	0.10%	−2.22%
Turnout		19,567	84.84%	4.61%
Registered electors		23,064		2.25%
INC gain from MSCP		Swing	-3.49%	

=== Assembly Election 2012 ===
2012 Manipur Legislative Assembly election: Sagolband
Party	Candidate	Votes	%	±%
MSCP	Rajkumar Imo Singh	9,150	50.56%	
INC	Dr. Khwairakpam Loken Singh	8,731	48.25%	−2.98%
Margin of victory		419	2.32%	−6.34%
Turnout		18,096	80.22%	1.35%
Registered electors		22,557		3.66%
MSCP gain from INC		Swing	-0.67%	

=== Assembly Election 2007 ===
2007 Manipur Legislative Assembly election: Sagolband
Party	Candidate	Votes	%	±%
INC	Dr. Khwairakpam Loken Singh	8,792	51.23%	22.15%
RJD	Soram Natum Singh	7,306	42.57%	
NCP	Moirangthem Kumar Singh	925	5.39%	3.86%
Independent	Laishram Gyaneshwar	139	0.81%	
Margin of victory		1,486	8.66%	3.43%
Turnout		17,162	78.87%	−0.03%
Registered electors		21,760		9.20%
INC gain from Manipur National Conference		Swing	16.92%	

=== Assembly Election 2002 ===
2002 Manipur Legislative Assembly election: Sagolband
Party	Candidate	Votes	%	±%
Manipur National Conference	Soram Natum Singh	5,394	34.31%	
INC	Dr. Khwairakpam Loken Singh	4,572	29.08%	
FPM	Moirangthem Kumar Singh	3,594	22.86%	−0.22%
CPI	Thokchom Manglem Singh	500	3.18%	
BJP	Gogonbihari Singh Thokchom	368	2.34%	−12.63%
MSCP	Thangjam Ibohal Singh	359	2.28%	−26.45%
DRPP	R.K. Rashmani Singh	292	1.86%	
NCP	Rajkumar Nokulsana Singh	241	1.53%	1.03%
SAP	Salam Damodar Singh	234	1.49%	
Independent	Laishram Gyaneshwar	88	0.56%	
Independent	Nongmaithem Homendro Singh @ Ishwarchandra	79	0.50%	
Margin of victory		822	5.23%	1.25%
Turnout		15,721	78.90%	−4.96%
Registered electors		19,926		2.44%
Manipur National Conference gain from JD(S)		Swing	0.62%	

=== Assembly Election 2000 ===
2000 Manipur Legislative Assembly election: Sagolband
Party	Candidate	Votes	%	±%
JD(S)	Dr. Khwairakpam Loken Singh	5,235	32.71%	
MSCP	Moirangthem Kumar Singh	4,598	28.73%	
FPM	Soram Natum Singh	3,694	23.08%	9.63%
BJP	Wahengbam Mobicha Singh	2,396	14.97%	3.53%
NCP	Angom-Cha Araba	80	0.50%	
Margin of victory		637	3.98%	−6.20%
Turnout		16,003	83.03%	−0.83%
Registered electors		19,451		7.88%
JD(S) gain from MPP		Swing	-0.98%	

=== Assembly Election 1995 ===
1995 Manipur Legislative Assembly election: Sagolband
Party	Candidate	Votes	%	±%
MPP	Moirangthem Kumar Singh	5,037	33.69%	−5.44%
JD	Dr. Khwairakpam Loken Singh	3,515	23.51%	
INC	R.K. Ongbi Sorojini Devi	2,678	17.91%	−32.35%
FPM	Salam Damudar Singh	2,011	13.45%	
BJP	R.K. Tarachand Singh	1,711	11.44%	
Margin of victory		1,522	10.18%	−0.95%
Turnout		14,952	83.85%	2.94%
Registered electors		18,030		−2.59%
MPP gain from INC		Swing	-16.57%	

=== Assembly Election 1990 ===
1990 Manipur Legislative Assembly election: Sagolband
Party	Candidate	Votes	%	±%
INC	R. K. Jaichandra	7,443	50.26%	44.93%
MPP	Moirangthem Kumar Singh	5,795	39.13%	20.76%
JD	Salam Damudar Singh	1,572	10.61%	
Margin of victory		1,648	11.13%	6.79%
Turnout		14,810	80.92%	3.26%
Registered electors		18,509		24.57%
INC gain from Independent		Swing	27.55%	

=== Assembly Election 1984 ===
1984 Manipur Legislative Assembly election: Sagolband
Party	Candidate	Votes	%	±%
Independent	Salam Damodar Singh	2,562	22.70%	
MPP	Moirangthem Kumar Singh	2,073	18.37%	−0.65%
Independent	Wahengbam Sarat	1,821	16.14%	
Independent	Pheoroijam Rameshchandra	1,391	12.33%	
IC(S)	Loktongbam Iboyaima	628	5.56%	
INC	W. Joymati Devi	601	5.33%	
JP	Salam Ranjit	597	5.29%	
CPI	Salam Indubhushon	573	5.08%	−4.82%
BJP	R. K. Dolansana	492	4.36%	
Independent	Thokchom Araghunath	345	3.06%	
Independent	Kh. Radhakishor	202	1.79%	
Margin of victory		489	4.33%	−3.10%
Turnout		11,285	77.66%	2.63%
Registered electors		14,858		10.39%
Independent gain from MPP		Swing	3.69%	

=== Assembly Election 1980 ===
1980 Manipur Legislative Assembly election: Sagolband
Party	Candidate	Votes	%	±%
MPP	Moirangthem Kumar Singh	1,862	19.02%	−19.22%
Independent	Salam Damodar Singh	1,134	11.58%	
INC(I)	B. K. Jaichandra	1,120	11.44%	
Independent	Thounaujam Tomba	1,091	11.14%	
JP	S. Tombi	1,057	10.79%	
CPI	Mutum Janaki	969	9.90%	−19.31%
Independent	S. Laingem	938	9.58%	
Independent	Thokohom Raghunath	571	5.83%	
Independent	Loktongbam Iboyaima	565	5.77%	
INC(U)	Wahengbam Joymati	378	3.86%	
Independent	S. Manihar	107	1.09%	
Margin of victory		728	7.43%	−1.59%
Turnout		9,792	75.03%	−1.96%
Registered electors		13,460		15.52%
MPP hold		Swing	-19.22%	

=== Assembly Election 1974 ===
1974 Manipur Legislative Assembly election: Sagolband
Party	Candidate	Votes	%	±%
MPP	Salam Tombi	3,359	38.24%	1.61%
CPI	Thokchom Bira	2,566	29.21%	−13.00%
INC(O)	Wahemgbam Tomcha Singh	1,051	11.96%	
Independent	Paokhamlung	911	10.37%	
Independent	Rajkumar Hirenya Sana	898	10.22%	
Margin of victory		793	9.03%	3.44%
Turnout		8,785	76.99%	−8.91%
Registered electors		11,652		70.80%
MPP gain from CPI		Swing	-3.97%	

=== Assembly Election 1972 ===
1972 Manipur Legislative Assembly election: Sagolband
Party	Candidate	Votes	%	±%
CPI	Thokchom Bira	2,427	42.21%	
MPP	Salam Gambhir	2,106	36.63%	
INC	Arambam Lalmani Singh	729	12.68%	−39.32%
INC(O)	Wahengbam Tomcha	488	8.49%	
Margin of victory		321	5.58%	1.59%
Turnout		5,750	85.90%	6.41%
Registered electors		6,822		−57.90%
CPI gain from INC		Swing	-9.79%	

=== Assembly Election 1967 ===
1967 Manipur Legislative Assembly election: Sagolband
Party	Candidate	Votes	%	±%
INC	S. Gambhir	6,595	52.00%	
Independent	N. Ibomcha	6,088	48.00%	
Margin of victory		507	4.00%	
Turnout		12,683	79.49%	
Registered electors		16,203		
INC win (new seat)				

== See also ==
- List of constituencies of the Manipur Legislative Assembly
- Imphal West district
