= Irabot (name) =

Irabot is an Indian male given name, especially popular among the Meitei people. Notable people with the given name include:

- Hijam Irabot (1896–1951), Indian politician and activist
- Kshetri Irabot Singh (born 1938), Indian politician
