= List of Breton people =

This is an incomplete list of some Breton people of note and of some notable individuals born in Brittany, alphabetically within categories. Brittany (Breizh in Breton) is a Celtic nation of northwestern France and has contributed famous names to all walks of life.

== Actors and actresses ==
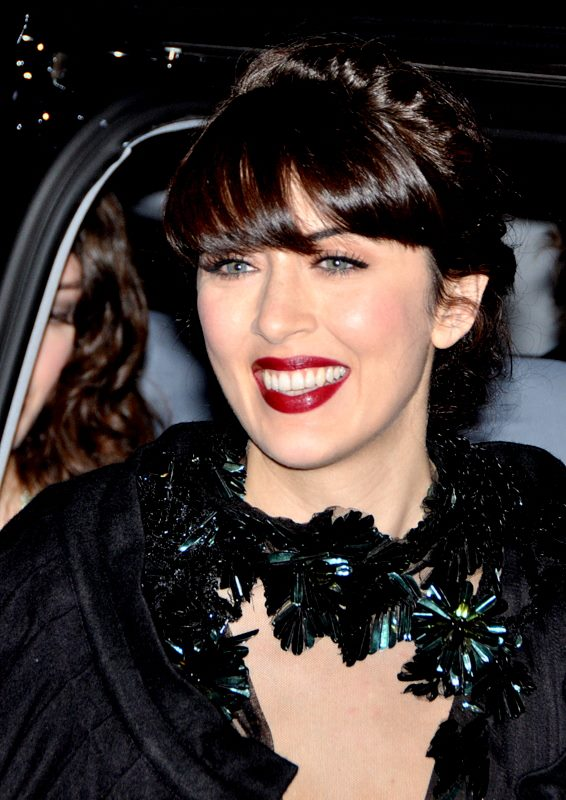
Nolwenn Leroy attending the NRJ Music Awards, 2013.

- Mylène Jampanoï, half Breton from her mother.
- Solenn Heussaff, host, model, internet celebrity, actress, singer, half-Filipina, half-Breton
- Malik Zidi, actor, half Breton from his mother.

== Musicians ==
- Alain Barrière, singer
- Dan Ar Braz, guitarist
- Brigitte Fontaine, singer, actress and writer
- Nolwenn Leroy, singer
- Plouz & Foen, rap duo
- Denez Prigent, singer
- Gilles Servat, singer
- Alain Stivell, musician
- Yann Tiersen, composer notable for the score to the Jean-Pierre Jeunet movie Amélie.
- Tri Yann, folk rock group
- The Red Lady of Brittany, composer of the Lay of the Beach, an instrumental and vocal celebration of William the Conqueror’s vacation at Barfleur circa 1078 which was popular in the Norwegian royal court around the year 1200

== Rulers, politicians, soldiers ==
- Anne of Brittany, Duchess of Brittany and twice Queen of France
- Claude of France, elder daughter of Anne of Brittany; also a Queen of France
- Robert Surcouf, famous corsair
- Jeanne de Clisson, ‘Lioness of Brittany’, who conducted naval action against French ships and ports in revenge for her husband's execution
- Riothamus, ‘King of the Britons’, an ally of the Roman emperor Anthemius and a correspondent with Sidonius Apollinaris; a possible inspiration for some of the stories about ‘King Arthur’
- Alan I, King of Brittany, ‘Alan the Great’, Count of Vannes and ruler of Brittany at the peak of its extent, documented ancestor of Conan I, Duke of Brittany
- Conan I, Duke of Brittany, ancestor of Odo, Count of Penthièvre and William the Conqueror; brother-in-law of Fulk Nerra, Count of Anjou; died defending Brittany from Fulk Nerra; buried at Mont St-Michel
- Judith of Brittany, daughter of Conan I and Duchess of Normandy, grandmother of Judith of Flanders (died 1095) and William the Conqueror
- Odo, Count of Penthièvre, older maternal first cousin of Edward the Confessor and sometime Duke Regent of Brittany, younger double-cousin to Robert I, Duke of Normandy and usually an ally of William the Conqueror
- Alan Rufus, commander of William the Conqueror’s household knights; second of seven legitimate sons of Odo, Count of Penthièvre; founder of Richmond Castle and St Mary's Abbey, York
- Brian of Brittany, first Earl of Cornwall, brother of Alan Rufus
- Stephen, Count of Tréguier, opened England’s first Parliament, a brother of Alan Rufus and ancestor of the dukes of Brittany from Conan IV onward
- Ribald of Middleham, ancestor of the House of Neville, a half-brother of Alan Rufus
- Bardolph of Ravensworth, ancestor of Baron FitzHugh, a half-brother of Alan Rufus
- William of Bowes, ancestor of the Bowes-Lyon family, a cousin of Alan Rufus
- Alan III, Duke of Brittany, childhood guardian of William the Conqueror and eldest brother of Odo of Penthièvre
- Conan II, Duke of Brittany, son of Alan III, powerful rival to both Odo of Penthièvre and William the Conqueror, overran northern Anjou immediately before his death (allegedly by poisoning)
- Hoël II, Duke of Brittany, technically Duke Consort and then Regent for his son Alan IV; also known as Hoël V, Count of Cornouaille
- Alan IV, Duke of Brittany, son-in-law of William the Conqueror, a crusader, an important ally of Henry I of England, and a grandson of Alan III; frequently mistaken by writers for his close relative Alan Rufus
- Arthur I, Duke of Brittany, his suspected murder by his uncle King John of England accelerated the destruction of the Angevin Empire
- Arthur II, Duke of Brittany, gave peasants seats in the Breton parliament
- Arthur III, Duke of Brittany, Constable of France and architect of French victory in the Hundred Years' War, younger step-brother of Henry V of England, and brother-in-law of Jacquetta of Luxembourg; a possible inspiration for Thomas Malory’s ‘Le Morte d'Arthur’
- Ralph the Staller, Anglo-Breton from Norfolk who served English kings from Cnut the Great to William the Conqueror, while also being lord of Gaël and Montfort in Brittany
- Robert fitz Wymarc, a Staller for Edward the Confessor and present at Edward's death bed; related to King Edward, William the Conqueror and Odo of Penthièvre; advised William the Conqueror to return to Normandy as his force was no match for Harold Godwinson’s army
- Alfred of Lincoln, a Domesday tenant-in-chief; probably married a daughter of William Malet
- Cardinal de Rohan, accidentally precipitated the French Revolution
- Jean Cras, naval officer and composer, inventor of the Cras navigational plotter

== Scientists ==
- René Laennec, physician and inventor of the stethoscope who pioneered modern auscultation
- Yann LeCun, Breton-American computer scientist and one of the three 'Godfathers of AI'

== Writers ==
- René Cardaliaguet, priest and writer
- J. M. G. Le Clézio, winner of the 2008 Nobel Prize in Literature
- François-René de Chateaubriand, romantic writer and politician
- Tristan Corbière, symbolist poet
- Ernest Renan, philosopher and writer
- Muriel the Poetess, nun at Wilton Abbey who composed verse and corresponded with notable contemporary poets
- Peter Abelard, scholastic philosopher and professor at Paris
- Jules Verne, highly influential novelist, poet, and playwright

== Sailors ==
- Jacques Cartier, explorer who claimed what is now Canada for France, and the first European to map the Gulf of St. Lawrence
- Olivier de Kersauson, notable yachtsman
- Eric Tabarly, notable yachtsman

== Sportspeople ==
- Thibault Tricole (born 1989), darts player

=== Athletics ===
- Pierre-Ambroise Bosse (born 1992), 800m runner, 2017 world champion
- Maryvonne Dupureur (1937-2008), 800m runner, 1964 Olympic silver medallist

=== Cycling ===
- Warren Barguil (born 1991)
- Aude Biannic (born 1991)
- Louison Bobet (1925-1983), 3-time winner of the Tour de France
- Anthony Charteau (born 1979)
- Bryan Coquard (born 1992)
- Audrey Cordon (born 1989)
- Jean Dotto (1928-2000), winner of the 1955 Vuelta a España
- René Le Grevès (1910-1946)
- Bernard Hinault (born 1954), 5-time winner of the Tour de France, 3-time winner of the Giro d'Italia, 2-time winner of the Vuelta a España
- Pascal Lino (born 1966)
- Jean Malléjac (1929-2000)
- Lucien Petit-Breton (1882-1917), 2-time winner of the Tour de France
- Jean Robic (1921-1980), winner of the 1947 Tour de France

=== Football ===
- Yoann Gourcuff (born 1986), French international
- Stéphane Guivarc'h (born 1970), former French international, 1998 World Cup winner
- Paul Le Guen (born 1964), former French international
- Yvon Le Roux (born 1960), former French international, 1984 European Championship winner
- Alex Thépot (1906-1989), former French international
- Jérémy Toulalan (born 1983), former French international

== Miscellaneous ==
- Armella Nicolas, serving-maid venerated by some lay Catholics
- Robert of Arbrissel, founder of Fontevraud Abbey
- Albinus of Angers, late antique Abbot of Angers, born in Vannes, commemorated in numerous placenames across northern Europe
