= Nongmatang =

- Theatrical release poster
- Directed by: Suvas E.
- Written by: Ajit Yumnam
- Produced by: Ajit Yumnam; Brojen Yumnam
- Starring: Kaiku Rajkumar; Abenao Elangbam; Prity Maibam (National Bravery Awardee)
- Cinematography: Manithoi Asem; Nanda Ch.
- Edited by: Manithoi Asem; Dhake
- Music by: Gopi; A.K. Yangoi
- Production company: Cultural Society Khuman Maheikol
- Distributed by: Skyline Pictures
- Release date: 2014
- Running time: 94 minutes
- Country: India
- Language: Meiteilon (Manipuri)

Nongmatang (English: Only One Day) is a 2014 Manipuri film directed by Suvas E. and produced by Ajit Yumnam and Brojen Yumnam, under the banner of Cultural Society Khuman Maheikol and presented by Skyline Pictures. It stars Kaiku Rajkumar, Abenao Elangbam and Prity Maibam in the lead, with the supporting cast including Binitia, Ashokumar, Geetchandra, Puinabati, Priya, Nando Sharma, Brojendrakumar, and Somorendro. Ajit Yumnam wrote the screenplay. Nongmatang got selection at the 3rd Delhi International Film Festival 2014.

== Synopsis ==
The film narrates the story of a girl Mangaleima who stood second position in the HSLCE (High School Leaving Certificate Examination), Manipur. The film starts with Mangaleima explaining to media on how she became successful and was able to stand in the second position. She is supported well by her teachers and friends from school, Chinglen, Tampha and Thaja, particularly teacher Chinglen, who doesn't believe in the habit of students taking up private tuitions, which is increasingly becoming a fashion in the present-day Manipur.

== Cast ==
- Kaiku Rajkumar as Sir Chinglen
- Abenao Elangbam as Madam Tampha
- Prity Maibam as Mangaleima
- Binitia Devi as Thaja
- Ashokumar Chongtham as Khuman Maheikol's Principal
- Gitchandra Chongtham as Thaja's Father
- Puinabati
- Priya
- Nando Sharma
- Brojendrakumar
- Somorendro

== Accolades ==
Nongmatang won the Best Feature Film Award at the Sahitya Seva Samiti Awards 2015, including the Best Feature Film Award and four awards at the 9th Manipur State Film Awards 2014.

Award	Category	Winner's name	Result	Ref.
4th SSS MANIFA 2015	Best Feature Film	Director: Suvas E. Producers: Ajit Yumnam & Brojen Yumnam	Won	
4th SSS MANIFA 2015	Best Actor in a Leading Role	Kaiku Rajkumar	Won	
4th SSS MANIFA 2015	Best Actress in a Leading Role	Prity Maibam	Won	
4th SSS MANIFA 2015	Best Actress in a Supporting Role	Binitia Devi	Won	
4th SSS MANIFA 2015	Best Story	Ajit Yumnam	Won	
4th SSS MANIFA 2015	Best Costume Designer	Gangarani	Won	
9th Manipur State Film Awards 2014	Best Children Film	Director: Suvas E. Producers: Ajit Yumnam & Brojen Yumnam	Won	
9th Manipur State Film Awards 2014	Best Screenplay	Ajit Yumnam	Won	
9th Manipur State Film Awards 2014	Special Jury Award	Prity Maibam	Won	
9th Manipur State Film Awards 2014	Best Actor in a Leading Role - Male	Rajkumar Kaiku Singh	Won	

== Soundtrack ==
Gopi and A.K. Yangoi composed the soundtrack for the film and Ajit Yumnam wrote the lyrics. The song is titled Taibang Meerol Amatta Tadringeido.

No.	Title	Lyrics	Singer(s)	Length
1.	"Taibang Meerol Amatta Tadringeido"	Ajit Yumnam	Babyrani, Nanaobi	03:27
Total length:				3:27
