= Sushmita Mangsatabam =

Indian actress and singer

- Born: Sushmita Mangsatabam; 8 December 1994; Luwangsangbam Awang Leikai, Manipur; Present address: Kontha Allahup, Manipur
- Occupations: Actress, Singer
- Spouse: Nitaranjan Konsam

Sushmita Mangsatabam is an Indian actress and singer who predominantly appears in Manipuri films. She completed her schooling from North Point Higher Secondary School. She is well known for her title role in the movie Thabaton.

== Career ==
She started singing at the age of thirteen, when she was in VIII standard. She is the only person in her family to take up singing and acting as profession. Before coming into films, she began shaping her career in singing. Noklunu Minokto Atoppa Kanada, Ningjaba Mana Nungshiba Mana, Leiraroidara Khallui Taibangsida, Ningthou Machasu Kallakte are some of her famous songs. Later, she started acting with the strong support from her mother. Her first film is Chahi Taramari. But she is better known and became popular with Thaba's role in Bijgupta Laishram's 2013 hit Thabaton. After this, she has done a number of films. Among her popular films were Lumfoo Tomba, Amukta Ani, Chow Chow Momo na haobara Shingju Bora na oinambara, Haidokpa Yade, Thabaton 2, Angangba Mayek (Pizza 2).

== Accolades ==
Sushmita Mangsatabam was honoured with different titles at film awards and festivals.

Award	Category	Film	Ref.
7th Sahitya Seva Samiti MANIFA 2018	Best Playback Singer - Female for the song Thabum Kaya Yamlakley	Khutsha Ani	
8th Sahitya Seva Samiti MANIFA 2019	Best Supporting Actress	Amuktang Ga Haikho	

== Selected filmography ==
Year	Film	Role	Director
2013	Thabaton	Thabaton	Bijgupta Laishram
2013	Chahi Taramari	Lamnganbi	G. Amir
2013	Chow Chow Momo na haobara Shingju Bora na oinambara	Manglembi	R.K. Jiten
2013	Lanngamba	Fajatombi	Warjeet Moirangthem
2013	Lumfoo Tomba	Lembisana	Bimol Phibou
2014	Leiyisigee Wangmada	Thaja	OC Meira
2014	Amukta Ani	Langlen	Romi Meitei
2014	Safu (Impact)	Bema	K. Bimol Sharma
2014	Thabaton 2	Thabaton	Bijgupta Laishram
2014	Leikhamton	Ningthibee	Tej Kshetri
2015	Ikaibana Sire	Thoibi	L. Prakash
2015	Kombeerei	Nungshirei	Bijgupta Laishram
2015	Haidokpa Yade	Thaja	Kepidas
2015	Fida	Thaballei	Bimol Phibou
2016	Luhongphan	Thadoi	Bimol Phibou
2016	Angangba Mayek (Pizza 2)	Pizza	Dinesh Tongbram
2016	Shajik Thaba	Sanarembi	Ojitbabu Ningthoujam
2016	Sukke Keda Ningthijabi	Ningthijabi	Homeshwori
2017	Khutsha Ani	Memthoi	IS Gurung
2017	Ningtha	Tampha	Homen D' Wai
2017	Wakching Thagee Sanarei	Sanarei	K. Bimol Sharma
2018	Amuktang-ga Haikho	Langdai	Romi Meitei
2018	Laija	Laija	Ojitbabu Ningthoujam
2018	Tomthin	Shileima Chanu	Ojitbabu Ningthoujam
2018	Leichilda Pallaba Thaja	Sangbannabi	Pilu H.
2018	Shiki Ibobi	Leina	Bimol Phibou
2019	Ibung-gee Ibemma	Phajabi	Sanaton Nongthomba
2019	Thabaton 3	Thabaton	Bijgupta Laishram
2019	Boiton Lakle	Henthoibi	Khoibam Homeshwori
2020	Aronba Wari	Yaiphabi	OC Meira
2022	Laija Lembi	Lembi	Sudhir Kangjam
Upcoming	Eise Eigira?	Juhi	Thoiba Soibam
Upcoming	Laija Lembi 2	Lembi	Sudhir Kangjam
Upcoming	Lonthokta Thamoi	Mainoubi	Inaocha Khundrakpam
Upcoming	Fajabi Hoo		Thoiba Soibam
