= Olinda (disambiguation) =

Olinda is a historic city in Pernambuco, Brazil.

Olinda may refer to:

== Places ==
- Olinda, Victoria, Australia
- Olinda, Ontario, Canada
- Olinda, Brea, California, U.S.
- Olinda, Hawaii, U.S.

== People with the given name ==
- Olinda Beja (born 1946), São Tomé and Príncipe poet, writer and narrator
- Olinda Bozán (1894–1977), Argentine film actress and comedian
- Olinda Castielle (born 1976), Swedish television personality
- Olinda Cho (born 1980), Singaporean singer, actress and entrepreneur
- Olinda Morais (born 1951), East Timorese politician

== See also ==
- Olindia, a genus of moths
