= Thingbaijam Babu Singh =

Indian choreographer

- Born: 8 February 1936 (age 90); Lairensajik, Manipur, India
- Occupations: Classical dancer Academic
- Known for: Manipuri dance
- Awards: Padma Shri; Sangeet Natak Akademi Award

Thingbaijam Babu Singh was an Indian classical dancer, academic and choreographer of the Indian classical dance form of Manipuri. He was the Pradhan Guru (chief instructor) of Pung and Raas traditions of Manipuri dance at the Jawaharlal Nehru Manipur Dance Academy of the Sangeet Natak Akademi. Born on 8 February 1936 at Lairensajik, a small village in the state of Manipur, he was known to have been one of the notable choreographers and teachers of Manipuri dance and had a long line of renowned performers such as Elam Endira Devi, Ibemubi Devi, and Priti Patel, as his students. Singh was the author of a book, Meitei Punglon Raga Ahouba, and was a recipient of the Sangeet Natak Akademi Award for the year 1990. The Government of India awarded him the fourth highest civilian honour of the Padma Shri, in 2007, for his contributions to Manipuri dance.

== See also ==
- Manipuri dance
- Elam Endira Devi
