= Ei Actor Natte =

- Theatrical release poster
- Directed by: Homen D' Wai
- Screenplay by: Homen D' Wai
- Story by: Rodhika Heingang
- Produced by: Rodhika Heingang
- Starring: Silheiba Ningthoujam; Biju Ningombam
- Cinematography: Boong Konjengbam
- Edited by: Mohendro (KAMS)
- Music by: Tony Aheibam
- Production company: Imphal Star Film
- Distributed by: Imphal Star Film
- Release date: 25 October 2019
- Running time: 149 minutes
- Country: India
- Language: Meiteilon (Manipuri)

Ei Actor Natte (English: I'm Not An Actor) is a 2019 Manipuri romantic film directed by Homen D' Wai and produced by Rodhika Heingang. It stars Silheiba Ningthoujam and Biju Ningombam in the lead roles. The movie won the Best Popular Film Providing Wholesome Entertainment and Special Jury Mention awards at the 13th Manipur State Film Awards 2020. It also won two awards at the 9th MANIFA 2020.

Ei Actor Natte was released at Bhagyachandra Open Air Theatre (BOAT), Palace Compound, Imphal on 25 October 2019. The DVDs of the movie were released by MFDC in November 2021.

== Plot ==
It is a movie that sketches the unique story of Mani and Rashihenbi. Rashihenbi is an adopted daughter of Pamheiba. She is despised by his wife, Mani's mother. Rashihenbi is compelled to leave her home after her foster mother plots against her. Mani becomes a lunatic to win Rashihenbi back.

== Cast ==
- Silheiba Ningthoujam as Mani
- Biju Ningombam as Rashihenbi
- Ningthouja Jayvidya as Pamheiba, Mani's father
- Ningthoujam Rina as Mani's mother
- Kripalaxmi Gurumayum as Tampha
- Heisnam Geeta as Sakhenbi, Tampha's mother
- Master Changkhomba as Master Mani
- Baby Ghanaluxmi as Baby Rashihenbi
- Denny Likmabam as Dr. Thanil
- Y. Kumarjit as Khuraton, Rashihenbi's uncle
- Poison (Kh. Debabrata) as Ibemhal
- Surjit Saikhom
- Thokchom Ibomcha
- Dara
- Bhumeshor
- Jugindro Oinam

== Accolades ==
Ei Actor Natte won two awards out of the 12 nominations at the 9th MANIFA 2020 organised by Sahitya Seva Samiti, Kakching. It won the Best Popular Film Providing Wholesome Entertainment and Special Jury Mention Awards at the 13th Manipur State Film Awards 2020.

Award	Category	Winner's name	Result
13th Manipur State Film Awards 2020	Best Popular Film Providing Wholesome Entertainment	Producer: Rodhika Heingang; Director: Homen D' Wai	Won
13th Manipur State Film Awards 2020	Special Jury Mention	Biju Ningombam	Won
9th MANIFA 2020	Best Actor in a Leading Role - Female	Biju Ningombam	Won
9th MANIFA 2020	Best Editing	L. Mohendro	Won
9th MANIFA 2020	Best Art Director	Ady Yengkokpam	Nominated
9th MANIFA 2020	Best Actor in a Supporting Role - Female	Ningthoujam Rina	Nominated
9th MANIFA 2020	Best Feature Film	Producer: Rodhika Heingang; Director: Homen D' Wai	Nominated
9th MANIFA 2020	Best Actor in a Leading Role - Male	Silheiba Ningthoujam	Nominated
9th MANIFA 2020	Best Playback Singer - Female	Danubi Mangang for the song "Phajare Ningthire"	Nominated
9th MANIFA 2020	Best Background Score	Nanao Sagolmang	Nominated
9th MANIFA 2020	Best Cinematography	Boong Konjengbam	Nominated
9th MANIFA 2020	Best Make-Up	Poison	Nominated
9th MANIFA 2020	Best Choreography	Prameshwari	Nominated
9th MANIFA 2020	Best Screenplay	Homen D' Wai	Nominated

== Music ==
Tony Aheibam composed the soundtrack for the film and Homen D' Wai wrote the lyrics. The songs are titled Foreign Car and Phajare Ningthire.

No.	Title	Lyrics	Music	Singer(s)	Length
1.	"Foreign Car"	Homen D' Wai	Tony Aheibam	Gems Chongtham	04:21
2.	"Phajare Ningthire"	Homen D' Wai	Tony Aheibam	Danubi	05:01
Total length:					9:22
