= Rakhesh Singh Kshetrimayum =

Indian electrical engineer

Rakhesh Singh Kshetrimayum (born 1978) is an electrical engineer, educator and Professor in the department of Electronics and Electrical Engineering, Indian Institute of Technology Guwahati.

== Biography ==
Rakhesh earned his first class BTech degree in Electrical Engineering from the Indian Institute of Technology Bombay in 2000 and his Ph.D. degree from the School of Electrical and Electronics Engineering, Nanyang Technological University Singapore in 2005. He also earned a professional certificate in Data Science from Harvard University, USA in 2025. His doctoral advisor was Lei Zhu. He worked as a Postdoctoral Scholar at the Department of EE, Pennsylvania State University, USA, in 2005; Research Associate at the Department of Electrical Communication Engineering, Indian Institute of Science, Bengaluru, from 2004 to 2005 and Software Engineer with Mphasis, India, from 2000 to 2001. He is currently a Professor of EEE at the Indian Institute of Technology Guwahati and was the former Head of Center for Career Development from April 2018 to March 2020.

He is currently serving as an Associate Editor of IEEE Open Journal of Antennas and Propagation, served as an Editor of IEEE Communications Letters, during 2021-2023 and editorial board member of IEEE Transactions on Microwave Theory and Techniques from 2005 to 2007. He has served on the organizing committees of several IEEE conferences in various capacities, such as a General Chair of the National Conference on Communications (NCC) 2023, TPC Chair (communications track) of the NCC 2016, TPC Co-chair of IEEE Applied Electromagnetics Conference (AEMC) 2015. He has been in the technical program committee of IEEE International Conference on Communications (ICC), Global Communications Conference (GLOBECOM), Asia Pacific Microwave Conference, etc.

== Awards and honors ==
His awards and honors include:

- Fellow of the Institution of Engineering and Technology (IET)
- Senior Member of IEEE
- Fellow of IETE
- Fellow of IEI
- Life Fellow of Optical Society of India (OSI)
- Life Fellow of Antennas Test & Measurement Society of India (ATMS)
- IETE S. K. Mitra Memorial Award, 2017
- IETE M. Rathore Memorial Award, 2015
- IEEE ANTS 2017 Best Paper Award (Third Prize)

== Published works ==
Kshetrimayum has written the following books:

- R. S. Kshetrimayum, Fundamentals of MIMO Wireless Communications, Cambridge University Press, 2017.
- B. Kumbhani and R. S. Kshetrimayum, MIMO Wireless Communications over Generalized Fading Channels, CRC Press, 2017.
- A. Bhowal and R. S. Kshetrimayum, Advanced Spatial Modulation Systems, Springer Nature, 2021.

== See also ==
- Kshetrimayum
