= Rajkumar Imo Singh =

Indian politician

Member of Manipur Legislative Assembly
- In office 2012–Incumbent
- Preceded by: Khwairakpam Loken Singh
- Constituency: Sagolband

Personal details
- Born: Rajkumar Imo Singh
- Party: Bharatiya Janata Party
- Relations: Nongthombam Biren Singh (Father in Law)
- Parents: Rajkumar Jaichandra Singh (father); R. K. Sorojini Devi (mother)

Rajkumar Imo Singh, also known as R.K. Imo Singh is an Indian politician from the State of Manipur belonging to the Bharatiya Janata Party (BJP). He was earlier a member of the Indian National Congress, and was elected to the Manipur Legislative Assembly from Sagolband constituency in 2012 and 2017. He joined the BJP in 2021 and got re-elected in 2022.

== Family background ==
He is the eldest son of Rajkumar Jaichandra Singh, the first Union Minister from Manipur in the erstwhile ministry of Rajiv Gandhi. He was subsequently deputed as the Chief Minister of the State. His grandfather R.K. Birchandra Singh was the first Congress President of the State of Manipur when Manipur attained statehood. Imo Singh is also the President of Manipur Cricket Association, affiliated to BCCI.

== Political career ==
Despite having a close relationship with the Gandhi family and the higher coterie of AICC, Imo Singh was not given any responsibility in the AICC, it is believed that he was assured of some form of responsibility over the last 3/4 years. His detractors say that the sole reason for not getting it was due to the fact that he is the son-in-law of the present BJP Chief Minister of Manipur, Nongthombam Biren Singh.

During the 2020 Rajya Sabha Election, he voted for the Bharatiya Janata Party candidate Leishemba Sanajaoba in Rajya Sabha in 2020 Rajya Sabha elections in Manipur. His relationship with the CLP Leader and ex CM Okram Ibobi Singh is believed to be one of the factors for his action leading to his voting for the Maharaja of Manipur. His detractors believe that his relationship with the present Chief Minister was the main reason for him going against the party line. He however voted for the Indian National Congress during the vote of confidence in the Manipur Legislative Assembly held in August after the Rajya Sabha Election. RK Imo Singh was subsequently expelled from the Congress Party. It is believed that he played a crucial role in making the six legislators resign from the Congress Party after the vote of confidence, apart from making two more Congress Legislators abstain from the Assembly.

Singh was expelled from Indian National Congress in 2020 for voting in favour of BJP Rajya Sabha Candidate Maharaja Leishemba Sanajaoba. He joined the BJP in November 2021.

RK Imo Singh is a mass based leader, who works closely amongst the people and the electorate. Despite being a young politician, he has been able to carve out a niche for himself by working closely with the masses. His management during the recent crisis in the state politics has won accolades amongst his opponents too. He has friends across party lines in both the BJP and the Congress and now plays an important role in the state politics for providing a stable government.

As President of Manipur Cricket Association, he has played an important role as an administrator to ensure the progress of Manipur Team into the Ranji Trophy Elite Group with a team of all indigenous players from the State. RK Imo Singh has played a proactive role in taking Manipur Cricket to the next level, by creating infrastructure and taking cricket to the masses, which is generally tilted towards football. In March 2023, new floodlights were installed at Luwangsangbam Cricket Stadium which was inaugurated by the Chief Minister of Manipur. The RK Jaichandra Singh Manipur Cricket League T20 Trophy was also unveiled for the promotion of T20 cricket in the State.

== Personal life ==
He was born to Raj Kumar Jaichandra Singh and RK Sorojini Devi. He has four siblings namely Joshila RK, Rajkumar Imo Singh, Rajkumar Momocha Singh and Tondonsana RK. His grandfather RK Birchandra Singh was President of the State Unit of the Indian National Congress Party of Manipur between 1967 and 1972, when the State attained statehood. He completed his schooling from Mayo College, Ajmer and Delhi Public School, RK Puram. He further completed his graduation, post graduation and law from Delhi University.

He is the son in law of Nongthombam Biren Singh who is the current Chief Minister of Manipur, as he is married to his lone daughter Anjubala Nongthombam, and has two sons namely Rajkumar Vivaan Singh and Rajkumar Riaan Singh.
