= Eikhoigi Yum =

- Poster
- Directed by: Romi Meitei
- Written by: Romi Meitei
- Produced by: Sheetal Chingsu; Romi Meitei
- Starring: Ningthoujam Priyojit; Sorri Senjam
- Cinematography: Kangabam Bikram; Johni Meitei
- Edited by: Johni Meitei
- Music by: Sound Designer: Nyan Jyoti Bhujan & Debajit Gayan
- Production company: Thangarakpa Living Frames
- Release date: March 2022 (MIFF)
- Running time: 89 minutes
- Country: India
- Language: Meiteilon

Eikhoigi Yum (English: Our Home) is a 2022 Manipuri film directed by Romi Meitei. It is jointly produced by Sheetal Chingsu and Romi Meitei under the banner of Thangarakpa Living Frames. The film got official selection at the 22nd Jio MAMI Mumbai Film Festival 2022. It was the opening film at the 1st Eikhoigi Imphal International Film Festival 2022. The film was certified by Central Board of Film Certification (CBFC) in 2021. The film won the National Film Award For Best Film In Meiteilon at the 69th National Film Awards.

Eikhoigi Yum got official selections at the 27th International Film Festival of Kerala 2022 (International Competition Section); 12th Indian Film Festival of Bhubaneswar 2023, Odisha and 45th Moscow International Film Festival 2023. It was screened on 24 November 2022 at the Sangai Film Festival 2022, which was organised as a part of the Manipur Sangai Festival.

== Cast ==
- Ningthoujam Priyojit as Chaoren
- Sorri Senjam as Pamheiba, Teacher
- Nganthoibi Ningthoujam as Chaoren's mother
- Bhumeshore as Chaoren's father

== Accolades ==
Eikhoigi Yum won five awards at the 14th Manipur State Film Awards 2022.

Award	Category	Winner's name	Result
14th Manipur State Film Awards 2022	Best Feature Film	Chingsubam Sheetal & Romi Meitei (Producers); Romi Meitei (Director)	Won
14th Manipur State Film Awards 2022	Best Art Direction	Konjengbam Demba Meitei	Won
14th Manipur State Film Awards 2022	Best Child Artiste	Ningthoujam Priyojit	Won
14th Manipur State Film Awards 2022	Best Audiography (Sound Designer)	Nyan Jyoti Bhujan & Debajit Gayan	Won
14th Manipur State Film Awards 2022	Best Editing	Johni Meitei	Won
5th Sailadhar Baruah Film Awards 2023	Best Director	Romi Meitei	Won
5th Sailadhar Baruah Film Awards 2023	Jury Special Mention	Ningthoujam Priyojit	Won
5th Sailadhar Baruah Film Awards 2023	Best Cinematography	Bikram & Johni Meitei	Won
27th International Film Festival of Kerala 2022	FIPRESCI award for the Best International Film	Chingsubam Sheetal & Romi Meitei (Producers); Romi Meitei (Director)	Won
27th International Film Festival of Kerala 2022	NETPAC Jury Special Mention Award	Romi Meitei	Won
69th National Film Awards 2021	Best Manipuri Film	Chingsubam Sheetal & Romi Meitei (Producers); Romi Meitei (Director)	Won
Kazan International Film Festival 2023, Russia	Best Director	Romi Meitei	Won
Indie Meme Film Festival 2023, USA	Best Narrative Feature	Chingsubam Sheetal & Romi Meitei (Producers); Romi Meitei (Director)	Won
Yaraslav Film Festival 2023, Russia	Best Cinematography	Johni Meitei & Kangabam Bikram Singh	Won
