= IEEE Open Journal of Antennas and Propagation =

- Discipline: Antenna technology, electromagnetic propagation, scattering
- Language: English
- Edited by: Zhongxiang Shen

Publication details
- History: 2020–present
- Publisher: IEEE Antennas & Propagation Society
- Frequency: Monthly
- Open access: Yes
- License: CC BY
- Impact factor: 4.0 (2022)

Standard abbreviations
- ISO 4: IEEE Open J. Antennas Propag.

Indexing
- ISSN: 2637-6431
- LCCN: 2018202359
- OCLC no.: 1045069678

Links
- Journal homepage; Online access

The IEEE Open Journal of Antennas and Propagation is a peer-reviewed open-access scientific journal published by the IEEE Antennas & Propagation Society.

== Background ==
The journal covers research on antenna technology and propagation of electromagnetic waves. It also contains topical reviews, and perspective articles. It was established in 2020, with Konstantina Nikita (National Technical University of Athens) as the founding editor-in-chief. Since August 2022 the editor-in-chief is Zhongxiang Shen (Nanyang Technological University).

== Abstracting and indexing ==
The journal is abstracted and indexed in Ei Compendex, the Emerging Sources Citation Index, Inspec, and Scopus. According to the Journal Citation Reports, the journal has a 2022 impact factor of 4.0.

== See also ==
- IEEE Antennas and Wireless Propagation Letters
- IEEE Transactions on Antennas and Propagation
