= Chirom Indira =

Indian entrepreneur

Kshetrimayum Indira Devi
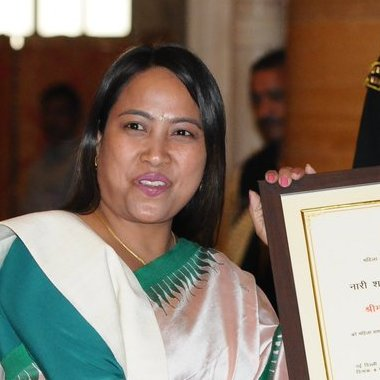
- Born: Imphal West district, Manipur
- Education: Political Science
- Alma mater: Indian Institute of Hardware Technology, Guwahati
- Occupations: Entrepreneur, designer, social worker
- Known for: Handloom weaving and design development
- Awards: National Award in Design Development of Handloom Products (2015); Nari Shakti Puraskar; Women Transforming India

Kshetrimayum Indira Devi, known as Chirom Indira, is an Indian entrepreneur, designer, and social worker. She was awarded Nari Shakti Puraskar for her contribution with handloom weaving.

== Early life and education ==
Devi was born in the Imphal West district of Manipur. She was the first born of six children. She is a graduate in Political Science and also studied weaving at the Indian Institute of Hardware Technology in Guwahati and her first job was nearby at Goenka woollen mills ltd in 1994.

== Career ==
In 2003, Devi and her husband set up an export company for handloom-crafted products. In 2015 the Ministry of Textiles recognised her work and she became the first Indian recipient of the National Award in Design Development of Handloom Products. On International Women's Day Devi was awarded the Nari Shakti Puraskar for her work with handloom weaving. The award was made by the President of India Ram Nath Kovind at the Presidential Palace (Rastrapati Bhavan) in New Delhi with the Prime Minister of India, Narendra Modi and the Minister for Women & Child Development, Maneka Sanjay Gandhi also attending. About 30 people and nine organisations were honoured that year, receiving the award and a prize each of $R 100,000. Another person honoured that day was Madhu Jain who was also excelling in textiles. On the same day as that award the nominations were open for fifteen women to receive the Women Transforming India Award which she was nominated for and awarded later that year.

By 2018, she had become a member of the All India Handloom Board, which was formed in 1992. However, the board was dissolved in 2020, as it was judged to be not effective enough.
