= Elam Endira Devi =

Indian classical dancer and teacher (Born: 1958)

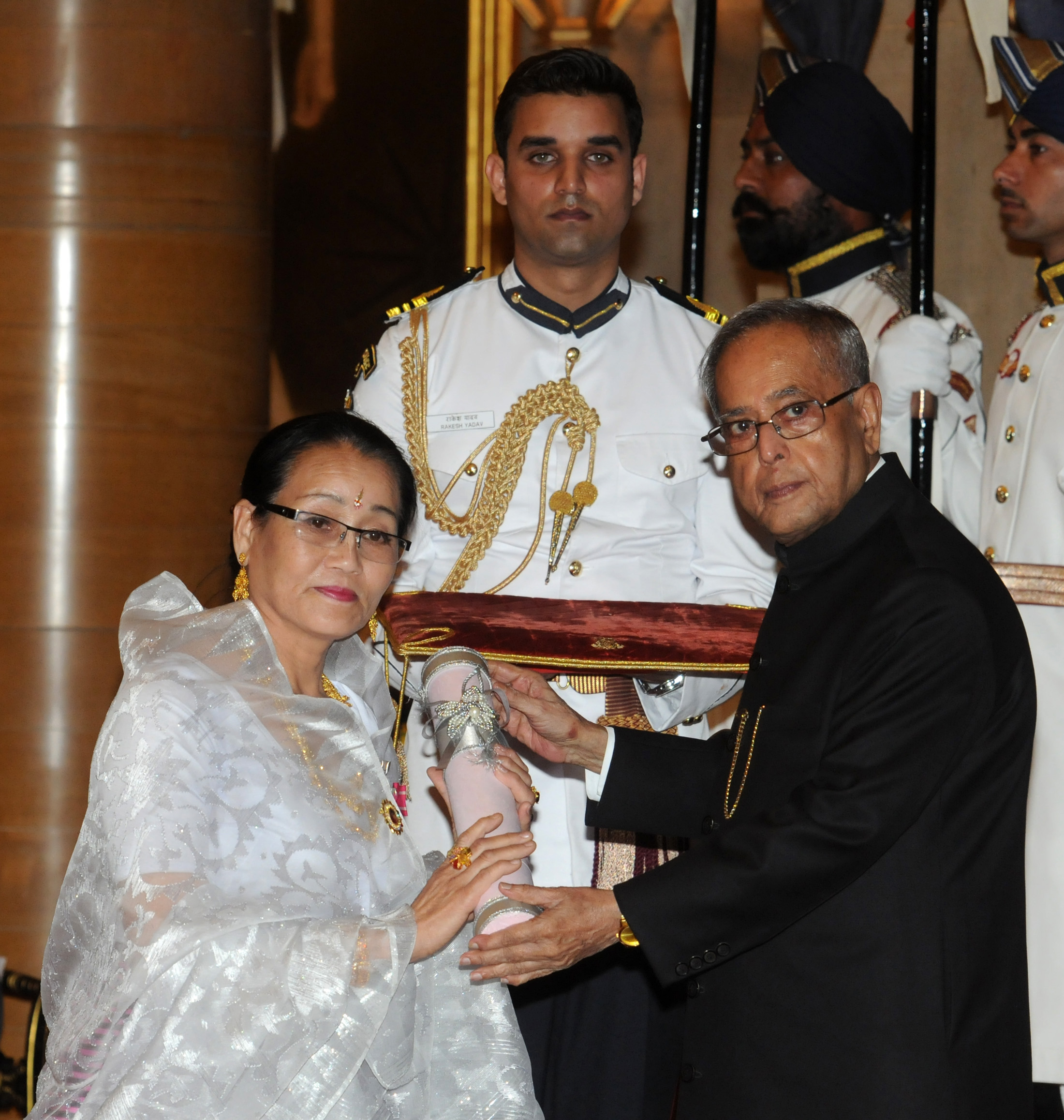
- Born: 1 September 1954 (age 71); Imphal, Manipur, India
- Occupation: Classical dancer
- Spouse: Haobam Manigopal Singh
- Children: 2 daughters and 3 sons
- Parent(s): Elam Bidhumani Singh; Elam Rosomani Devi
- Awards: Padma Shri

Elam Endira Devi, is an Indian classical dancer and teacher, known for her expertise and scholarship in the classical dance form of Manipuri, especially in the genres of Lai Haraoba and Raas. The Government of India honored her, in 2014, with the Padma Shri, the fourth highest civilian award, for her services to the field of art and culture.

== Biography ==
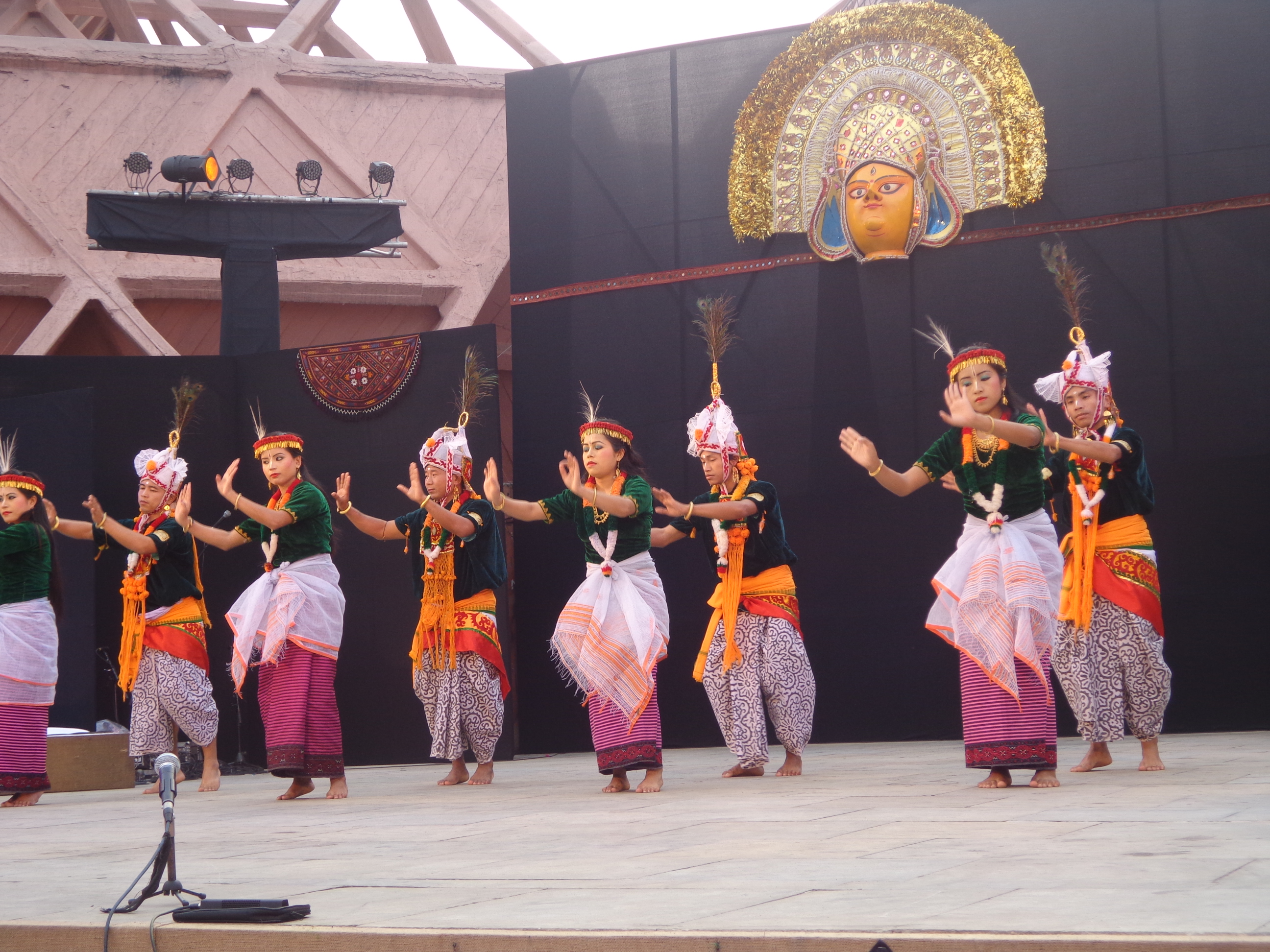
Lai haraoba.

Imparting training in dances in the form of regular exercise in order to bring up children through acquiring of profound knowledge in our cultural and traditional dances with the moulding of their character, discipline and maintaining their physical fitness. says Elam Endira Devi

Born on 1 September 1954 to Elam Bidhumani Singh and Elam Rosomani Devi at Khwai Nagamapal Singjubung Leirak, Imphal, in the north east Indian state of Manipur, Elam Indira Devi started learning Manipuri dance at the early age of eight, under the tutelage of Guru Lourembam Amuyaima Singh. Later, she studied under teachers such as R. K. Akesana, Padmashree Maisnam Amubi Singh, Thingbaijam Babu Singh and Thiyam Tarunkumar Singh, before joining JN Manipur Dance Academy, Imphal for the Diploma course where she had the opportunity to learn under R. K. Priyogopal Sana, Yumshanbi Maibi, Thambalngou, Ng Kumar Maibi and Haobam Nganbi. She passed the Diploma course of Nitya Charya in 1967.

Simultaneously, she maintained her curricular studies and secured BA and later, MA in Manipuri Culture and Literarture, in 1979, from Guwahati University. Meanwhile, she continued her studies in dance as well and, with the assistance of Young Artist Scholarship from the Ministry of Culture, the Government of India, completed post graduate degrees in Raas in 1979, and in Lai haraoba in 1984.

Endira Devi has performed in a feature film, Matamgi Manipur, which won the National Film Award for the best film in Meitei, in 1972. She has also performed at many regional, national and international stages. Some of the notable international performances are:

- Solo performance for Doordarshan - 1990
- Solo performance - 150th Birth Anniversary of Viswa Guru Rabindranath Tagore Commemoration - 2011
- Solo performance - 9th Bhagyachandra National Dance Festival of Classical Dance - 2011
- Solo performance - Indo-Soviet Cultural Friendship, Moscow - 1978
- Traditional Dance 'Lai Haraoba' - India Festival, Paris - 1985
- Lai Haraoba Classical Dance - Re-Union Island, France - Indian Council for Cultural Relations (ICCR) - 2010
- Solo performance - Lokutshab Festival, New Delhi - 1988

Endira Devi has also participated in many ballets and dance dramas.

Endira Devi is married to Haobam Manigopal Singh and the couple has three sons and two daughters.

== Meitei Traditional Dance Teaching School and Performing Centre ==
In 1993, Endira Devi founded the Meitei Traditional Dance Teaching School and Performing Centre at Imphal and is the Director of the Institute ever since. The institute a centre for learning classical and traditional dances and ballets and is recognized by the Ministry of Culture, Government of India.

== Positions ==
Endira Devi has held various noteworthy positions such as:

- Member - East Zone Cultural Centre, Kolkata - 2009-12
- Jury Member - Centre for Cultural Resources and Training, a Government of India sponsored autonomous organization for education and culture - 1996-2007
- Member - Audition panel - Doordarshan Guwahati - 1998-2000
- Member - Official delegation - USSR Folk Festival, Kolkata - 1987

She is a Life Member of the UNESCO Club Association of India since 2009 and has been serving as an Expert commentator on Manipuri Dance at the All India Radio, Imphal - from 1989 onwards. She has also worked as the guest lecturer for University Grants Commission at the Academic Staff College, Manipur University from 2001 to 2012 and is currently working as the Senior Guru at the Jawaharlal Nehru Manipur Dance Academy Manipur, Imphal, since 1996.

== Awards and recognitions ==
- Padma Shri - Government of India - 2014
- Excellence Award - World Theatre Day - Short Play - 1970
- Best Actress Award - All India Drama Festival - 1971
- Nritya Rani Upadhi - Cultural Dramatic Association, Moirang - 1984
- Junior Fellowship - Ministry of Culture - Government of India - 1990-92

== Writings ==
Elam Endira Devi has published four books on Manipuri dance and culture.

1. Elam Indira Devi (1998). Lai Haraoba Wakhallon Paring - Series of Thoughts on Lai Haraoba.
2. Meitei Jagoigi Chaorakpa Saktam (a glimpse of Manipuri Dance) - 1998
3. Lai Haraoba Anoi Eeshei - 2001
4. Lai Haraoba Anoi Warol - 2002
5. Dances of Lai Haraoba (under publication)

Lai Haraoba Wakhallon Paring (Series of thoughts on Lai-haraoba) won the Gold Medal from Naharol Sahitya Premi Samiti, Imphal in 2002

She has also presented several papers and delivered many lectures at various seminars and conferences at national and international level.

== Manipuri dance gallery ==
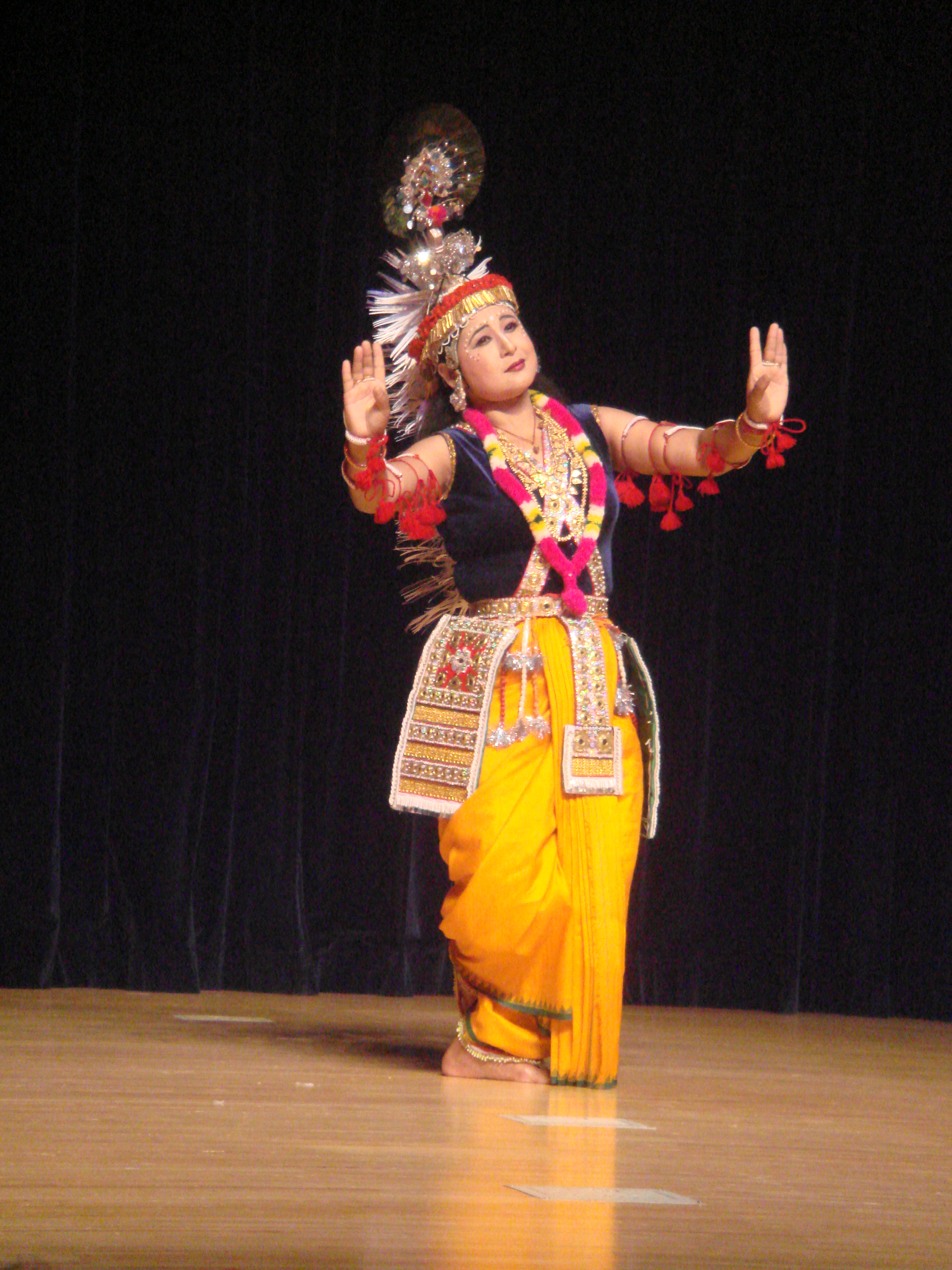

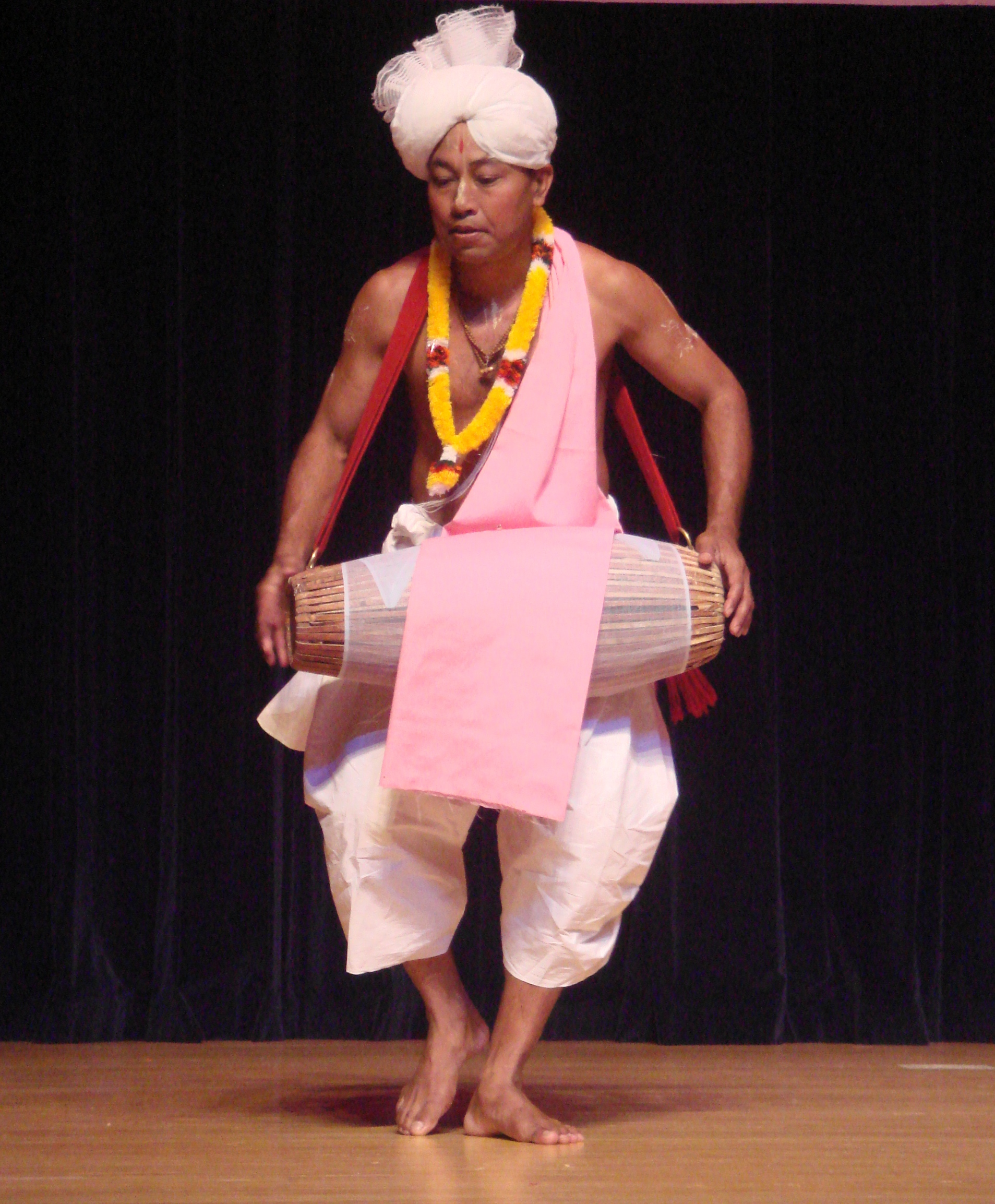

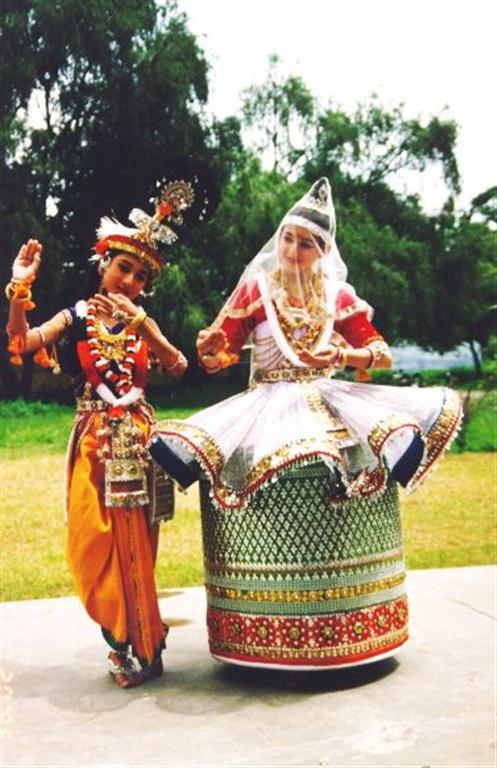

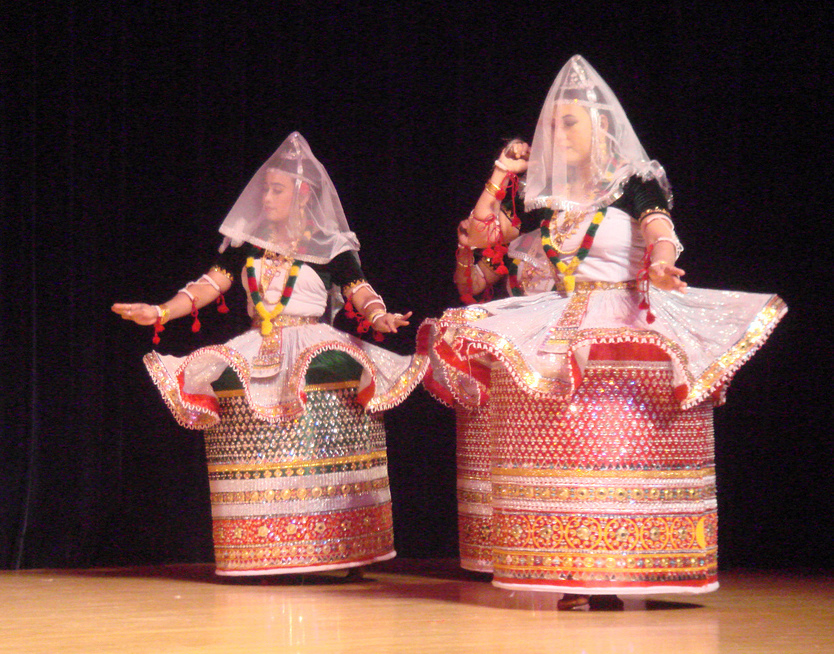

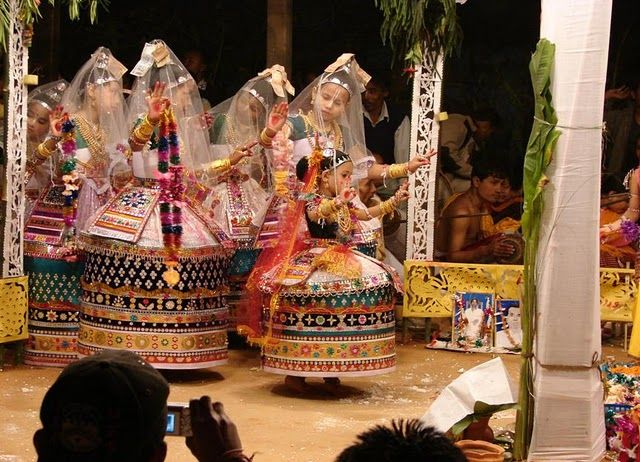

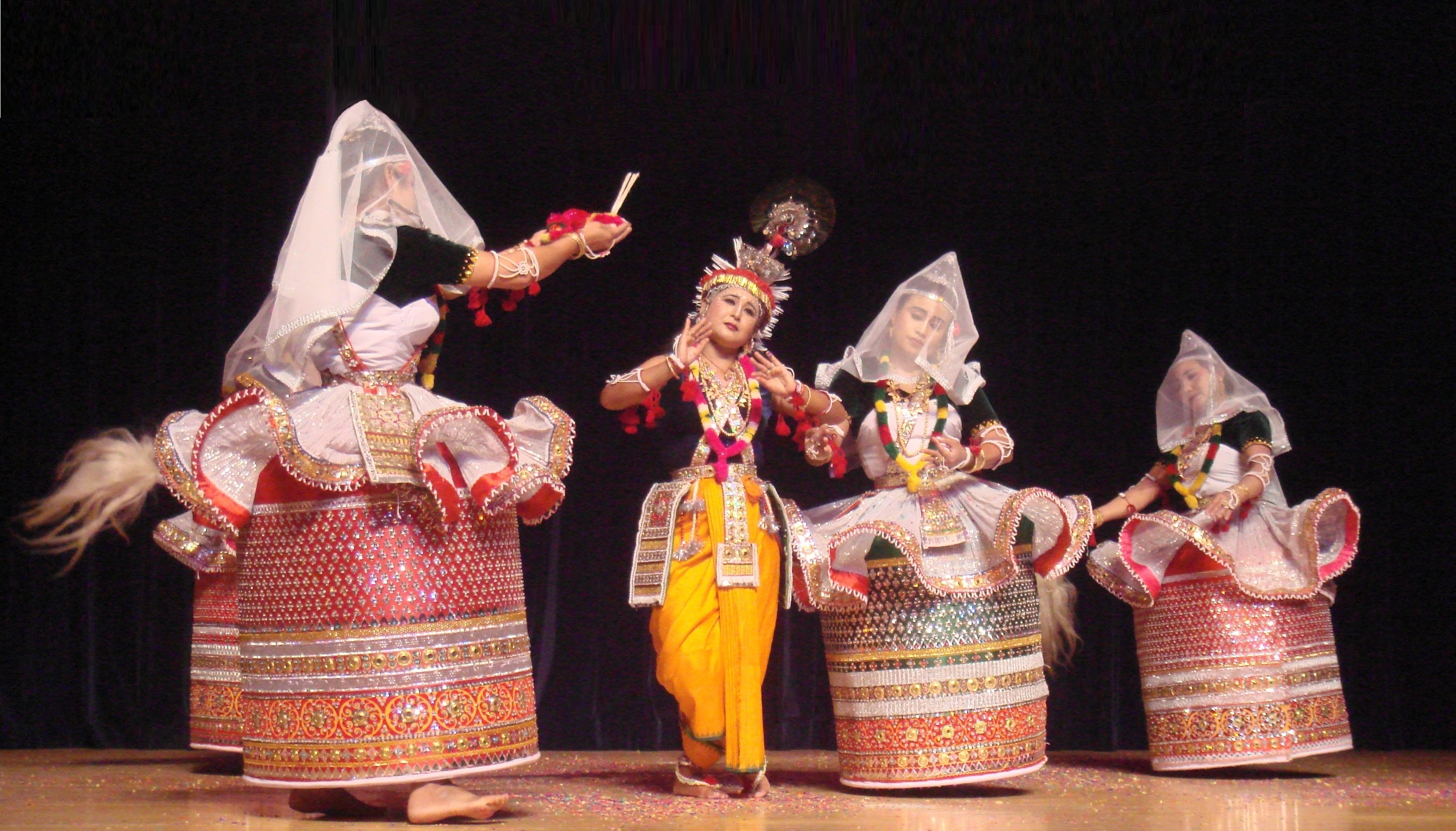

== See also ==
- Manipuri dance
- Lai Haraoba
