= Atombapu Sharma =

Atombapu Sharma (died 1963) also known as Pandit Raja Atombapu Sharma was a Manipuri Brahmin Sanskrit scholar, a Vaishnava, also versed in astronomy and astrology, a journalist and social reformer from Manipur, India. He is considered as "The Doyen of Journalism in Manipur".

== Works ==
Atombapu launched the first daily newspaper in Manipur “The Dainik Manipur Patrika” in 1933 and Thongbam Gokulchandra Singh was employed as the editor. He also played an important role in promoting Sankirtana movement in Manipur and authored many books. His other contributions include promotion of journalism, politics, arts and culture and other aspects of Manipur.

He also received the Sangeet Natak Akademi Award for Manipuri dance in 1963.
