= Rosa Garcia (journalist) =

Rosa Garcia dos Santos (born 8 September 1973) is an East Timor journalist. She is the editor in chief of the Timor Post, one of the main newspapers in that country.

== Career ==
Garcia started working as a journalist in 1993 at Suara Timor Timur (STT, today Suara Timor Lorosae). She was also employed as a correspondent for Kyodo News, Reuters, and the BBC. As a student, she was already an activist for East Timor's independence. During the independence referendum of 1999, Garcia worked for the non-governmental organisation Contras Timor-Timur, which was founded in 1998 by Isabel da Costa Ferreira to search for East Timorese who went missing during Indonesian rule. Garcia, who was pregnant at the time, was threatened over the telephone during her work. After the release of the results, in which East Timor voted for its independence, Garcia fled from the violence of pro-Indonesia militias, to Jakarta. A day after the International Force East Timor (INTERFET) restored peace and order and placed East Timor under United Nations administration, Garcia returned to East Timor together with colleagues from Sweden.

Garcia was one of the fourteen founders of the Timor Post in 1999–2000, and is a part-owner of the newspaper. During the 2006 East Timorese crisis, the Timor Post was forced to temporarily cease operations, after two employees were severely assaulted. Garcia, who had just given birth to her second child, worked for a while for the Australian broadcaster ABC.
