= Manuel Magalhaes de Oliveira =

Manuel Magalhaes de Oliveira (born 20 September 1951 – 9 September 1999) was a CNRT (Conselho Nacional de Resistência Timorense) Leader in Bobonaro District. CNRT is a National Council of East Timorese Resistance against 24 years of Indonesian brutal occupation. Already fluent in Portuguese, Tetun and several dialects, Manuel Magalhaes mastered the Indonesian language less than a year after Indonesia's 1975 invasion of East Timor. His fluency in languages also enabled him to establish trust with Indonesia and obtain a government job. His job allowed him to spy for East Timor's clandestine resistance.

Manuel Magalhaes was killed 9 September 1999, 5 days after the result East Timorese referendum where majority chose to be independent. He was killed at a lagoon near Maliana. Witnesses said Magalhaes was shot, his body hacked to pieces and tossed into the sea. The body was never found
