= Rajkumar Jaichandra Singh =

7th Chief Minister of Manipur

7th Chief Minister of Manipur

Personal details
- Born: 2 February 1942 (age 84)
- Party: Indian National Congress

Rajkumar Jaichandra Singh, also known as R. K. Jaichandra Singh (born 9 February 1942) was the 7th chief minister of the Northeastern Indian state of Manipur from 1988 to 1990. He was a close aide of the former Indian Prime Minister Rajiv Gandhi and a prominent leader for the state-unit of Indian National Congress (INC) from Sagolband Assembly Constituency in Manipur. He is the first Union Minister from Manipur having served in the Cabinet of Rajiv Gandhi between 1985 and 1988 as the Union Minister for Sports and Youth affairs, and later on as the Chemicals and Petrochemicals Minister. He was also closely associated with former Indian prime minister Indira Gandhi during the emergency period of Trikha Commission in Manipur.

He is the former member of Rajya Sabha from 10 April 1984 to 9 April 1988. Today, there is a RK Jaichandra Singh Memorial Trust at Sagolband, Bijoygovinda ground which has been construed in his memory. He was an advocate by profession having practised in Manipur. He attended school at St. Edmund's School, Shillong, followed by his LLB from Government Law College, Bombay and his master's degree in history from Lucknow University. He completed his graduation from Ramjas College in Delhi University.

He died on 13 June 1994 at Apollo Hospital Chennai. He is survived by his wife RK Sorojini Devi and four children, namely Joshila RK, Rajkumar Imo Singh, Rajkumar Momocha Singh and Tondonsana RK. Rajkumar Imo Singh is presently a three-term MLA from the same constituency of Sagolband.

RK Jaichandra Singh is the eldest son of RK Birchandra Singh, president of the State Unit of the Indian National Congress Party of Manipur between 1967 and 1972, when the state attained statehood.
