= Rajkumar Achouba Singh =

Indian classical dancer and teacher (born 1938)

- Born: 5 December 1938; Manipur, India
- Occupation: Classical dancer
- Awards: Padma Shri; Manipur State Award
- Website: Official web site

Rajkumar Achouba Singh (born 5 December 1938) is an Indian classical dancer and teacher, known for his scholarship on the Manipuri dance forms of Raas and Lai Haraoba. Singh, who is credited several books and articles on Manipuri culture, is a former Principal of the Jawaharlal Nehru Manipur Dance Academy, Imphal. A holder of post graduate degrees in Raas and Lai Haraoba, he has also been a visiting teacher at the Government Dance College, Imphal. He was honored by the Government of India, in 2010, with the fourth highest Indian civilian award of Padma Shri. He is also a recipient of the Manipur State Award.

== See also ==
- Lai Haraoba
- Manipuri dance
