= Laman Ama =

- Theatrical release poster
- Directed by: Sanad Aribam
- Screenplay by: Sanad Aribam
- Story by: Sanad Aribam
- Produced by: Dr. Rajeshwar Aribam
- Starring: Raju Nong; Saroja Chongtham; Hemlet Tonjam
- Cinematography: Arjun Ningthemcha
- Edited by: Sanad Aribam
- Music by: Denson Salam; Karnajit
- Production company: Fast Forward Films
- Distributed by: Fast Forward Films
- Release date: October 14, 2018
- Running time: 117 minutes
- Country: India
- Language: Meiteilon (officially called Manipuri language)

Laman Ama (English: A Vengeance Story) is a 2018 Manipuri film directed by Sanad Aribam and produced by Rajeshwar Aribam, under the banner of Fast Forward Films. It stars Raju Nong, Saroja Devi Chongtham and Hemlet Tonjam in the lead roles. It is a Manipuri thriller film. It is adapted from Randy Oliver's Angle of Deflection. The film was released at Manipur State Film Development Corporation (MSFDS), Imphal on 14 October 2018. The movie was selected for the 11th International Guwahati Film Festival 2018.

The blessing ceremony was held at Khagempalli Huidrom Leikai on 3 October 2015.

== Synopsis ==
A single mother with a shady past rises against all odds to avenge her daughter.

== Cast ==
- Raju Nong as Thouba
- Saroja Devi Chongtham as Ngambi
- Hemlet Tonjam as Pabung
- Sky Anoubam
- Paul Haokip
- Dhumga Kshetrimayum as Kanhai
- Jotin

== Accolades ==
Saroja Devi Chongtham won the Best Actor in a Leading Role - Female award at the 12th Manipur State Film Awards 2019.

Award	Category	Winner's name	Result
12th Manipur State Film Awards 2019	Best Actor in a Leading Role - Female	Saroja Devi Chongtham	Won
12th Manipur State Film Awards 2019	Best Cinematography	Arjun Ningthemcha	Won
4th Sailadhar Baruah Film Awards 2020	Best Art Direction	Sanad Aribam	Won
4th Sailadhar Baruah Film Awards 2020	Best Cinematography	Arjun Ningthemcha	Won
8th SSS MANIFA 2019	Best Lyricist	Irengbam Thawan	Won
8th SSS MANIFA 2019	Best Music Director	Karnajit	Won
8th SSS MANIFA 2019	Best Editing	Sanad Aribam	Won
8th SSS MANIFA 2019	Best Playback Singer - Male	Irengbam Thawan	Won
8th SSS MANIFA 2019	Best Feature Film	Producer: Dr. Rajeshwar Sharma Aribam; Director: Sanad Aribam	Nominated
8th SSS MANIFA 2019	Best Actor in a Leading Role - Female	Saroja Devi Chongtham	Nominated
8th SSS MANIFA 2019	Best Cinematography	Arjun Ningthemcha	Nominated
8th SSS MANIFA 2019	Best Make-Up	Kangana S.	Nominated
8th SSS MANIFA 2019	Best Screenplay	Sanad Aribam	Nominated
8th SSS MANIFA 2019	Best Direction	Sanad Aribam	Nominated

== Soundtrack ==
Denson Salam and Karnajit composed the soundtrack for the film and Kenedy Khuman and Irengbam Thawan wrote the lyrics. The songs are titled Minambani and Aroobana Mataida. The stop motion technique is used to create the video for the song Minambani. The mixing and mastering is done by Bibid Sh. The song was recorded at MS Recording.

No.	Title	Lyrics	Music	Singer(s)	Length
1.	"Minambani"	Kenedy Khuman	Denson Salam	Kenedy Khuman	03:14
2.	"Aroobana Mataida"	Irengbam Thawan	Karnajit	Irengbam Thawan	05:32
Total length:					8:46

== Reception ==
Chitra Ahanthem of Imphal Free Press opined that "Laman Ama is definitely a film worth watching".
