= Kaiku Rajkumar =

Indian actor from Manipur

Rajkumar Kaiku
- Born: Rajkumar Somendro; 3 January 1974 (age 52); Dimapur, Nagaland; Present address: Thangmeiband, Imphal, Manipur
- Education: Bachelor of Arts, DAV College, Chandigarh
- Occupation: Actor
- Years active: 2002-present
- Height: 1.68 m (5 ft 6 in)
- Spouse: R.K. Ongbi Kiranmala
- Children: 4
- Parent(s): R.K. Modhusana; R.K. Ongbi Reba

Rajkumar Kaiku (born 3 January 1974) is an Indian actor who appears in Manipuri films. He has appeared in over 400 Manipuri films. He contested the 2019 parliamentary election in the Inner Manipur Lok Sabha Constituency as an independent candidate. In February 2022, he joined the Bharatiya Janata Party. In 2023, he left the BJP after serving as a primary member. Some of his notable films are Nongmatang, Ta-Tomba The Great, Imagi Laman Singamdre and Enakta Leiringei.

== Accolades ==
Kaiku Rajkumar was honoured with different titles at several film awards and festivals.

Award	Category	Film	Ref.
4th Sahitya Seva Samiti MANIFA 2015	Best Actor - Male	Nongmatang	
9th Manipur State Film Awards 2014	Best Actor in a Leading Role - Male	Nongmatang	
11th Manipuri State Film Awards 2018	Best Actor - Male	Enakta Leiringei	

== Selected filmography ==
Year	Film	Role	Director
2003	Kalpana	Rajen	Ksh. Kishorekumar
2005	Mathang Mapokta	Rahul	Diya Khwairakpam
2006	Ta-Tomba the Great	Ta-Tomba /Tomba	Ksh. Kishorekumar
2006	Payal	Ravi	Amar Raj
2006	Basantagee Nongallamdai	Manimatum	Tej Kshetri
2006	Eedom Chatcharage	Punshiba	Amar Raj
2006	Ahing Amadi Houkhare	Loya	Diana Potsangbam & Sarah Potsangbam
2006	Nakenthana Ngairi	Sanjoy	Dinesh Tongbram
2007	Sur Da Ngaojabee	Sur	Khwairakpam Bishwamittra
2007	Eisu Meeni	Tomba	Chan Heisnam
2007	Thamoise Nangi Oiradi	Yaiphaba	Ishomani
2007	Angaobashu Thamoi Palli	Suraj	Ibochouba Samom & Premanda Laishram
2007	Torei	Imoba	Khwairakpam Bishwamittra
2007	Meera Memcha	Mahesh	Mohendro
2007	Naoshum	Pamheiba	O. Gautam
2008	Lanmei Thanbi	Punshiba	Chou En Lai & O. Mangi
2008	Chatlabra Waarouna?	Malem	Khwairakpam Bishwamittra
2008	Nungshibi Ahing	Thanil	Homen D' Wai
2008	Echan	Lemba	Amar Raj
2008	Kangla Karabar	Malangba	Pilu H.
2008	Tayai	Mani	K. Bimol Sharma
2009	Thokkidagi Kishi	Pamheiba	Diya Khwairakpam
2009	Gaari Driver	Thouba	Romi Meitei
2009	Leikang Thambal	Rameshwor	Tej Kshetri
2009	Meisa	Yoihen	Paojel
2009	Ahing Khuding	Loyanganba	Keneiz
2009	Eegi Machu	Manikhomba	Keiphah
2009	Nongoubee	Sanathoi	K. Bimol Sharma & Oja Tomba
2010	Imagi Laman Singamdre	Lan	Romi Meitei
2010	Saklon Amada	Ningthem	L. Surjakanta
2010	Lambidudei	Major Sanahal	K. Bimol Sharma
2010	Ee-Raang	Tomba	O. Sanou
2010	Momon Meenok	Thoiba	Ksh. Kishorekumar
2010	Amamba Lambee	Arun	Oken Amakcham
2010	Langdai	Saaphaba	Ranjitkumar Meitei
2010	Nakenthagi Wangmadasu	Sanahal	Devbrata Shamurai
2010	Torban Amagi Wari	Yaima	Niladhwaja Khuman
2010	Ahing Mamei	Suraj	Bimol Phibou
2011	Punshi Chuppa Nangshe Eigini	Chingkhei	Premanda
2011	Phijang Marumda	Ningthem	K. Bimol Sharma
2011	Laaman	Paari	L. Surjakanta
2011	Meiree Natte Liklanee	Yaiphaba	Amar Raj
2011	Nongmadi Soidana	Sanathoi	Ishomani
2011	Mami	Ningthem	Jeetendra Ningomba
2011	Hanggam Maru Pokkhaibi	Umesh	L. Surjakanta
2012	Thabaton	Yaima	Bijgupta Laishram
2012	Shabi Shanou	Achumba	Paojel
2012	Nongdambada Tanoubi	Nongdamba	Rajen Leishangthem
2013	Lanngamba	Lanngamba	Warjeet Moirangthem
2013	Dr. Hemogee Heloi	Dr. Hemo	Homen D' Wai
2013	Leihouroko	Punshiba	Amar Raj
2014	Meerang Mahum	Tomthin	Ajit Ningthouja
2014	Sathiba Danger	Paikhomba	Ajit Ningthouja
2014	Nongmatang	Chinglen	Suvas E.
2014	Thabaton 2	Yaima	Bijgupta Laishram
2014	23rd Century:Ngasigee Matungda	Boyai	Dinesh Tongbram
2015	Da Lem	Lem	Hemanta Khuman
2015	Nungshit Mapi	Amuba	Ajit Ningthouja
2016	Angangba Mayek (Pizza 2)	Mangal	Dinesh Tongbram
2016	Tharo Thambal	Sanahal	Bijgupta Laishram
2016	Thanil (Pizza 3)	Mangal	Dinesh Tongbram
2016	Ingagee Thanil	Dr. Manglem	Mohendro (KAMS)
2017	Itao Ibungo Nungsibee	Chaocha	Eepu
2017	Enakta Leiringei	Khaba	Manoranjan Longjam
2017	Kaongamdraba Facebook	Leishemba	AK. Gyaneshori
2018	Sanagi Nga	Thoithoi	Romi Meitei
2018	Amuktang-ga Haikho	Marjing	Romi Meitei
2018	Nurei	Thouna	Rakesh Moirangthem
2018	Hidak Tombi	Paikhomba	Chou En Lai
2018	Yotpi	Cameo appearance	Romi Meitei
2018	Shiki Ibobi	O. Ibobi Meitei	Bimol Phibou
2019	Thabaton 3	Yaima	Bijgupta Laishram
2022	Wangma Wangmada	Doctor	Kirmil Soraisam
2022	Ningol	Chinglen	Laimayum Surjakanta
2024	Leishna		Hemanta Khuman
2025	Naitom Shatpi	Khamba	Thoiba Ningthou
2025	Bamon Ebemma	Doctor	Bijgupta Laishram
