= René Cardaliaguet =

French priest and journalist

René Cardaliaguet (1875–1950) was a French priest and journalist. He was born in Quimper, and died in Bohars.
