= Manipuri Brahmin =

Brahmins native to Manipur

Manipuri Brahmin Meitei Brahmin
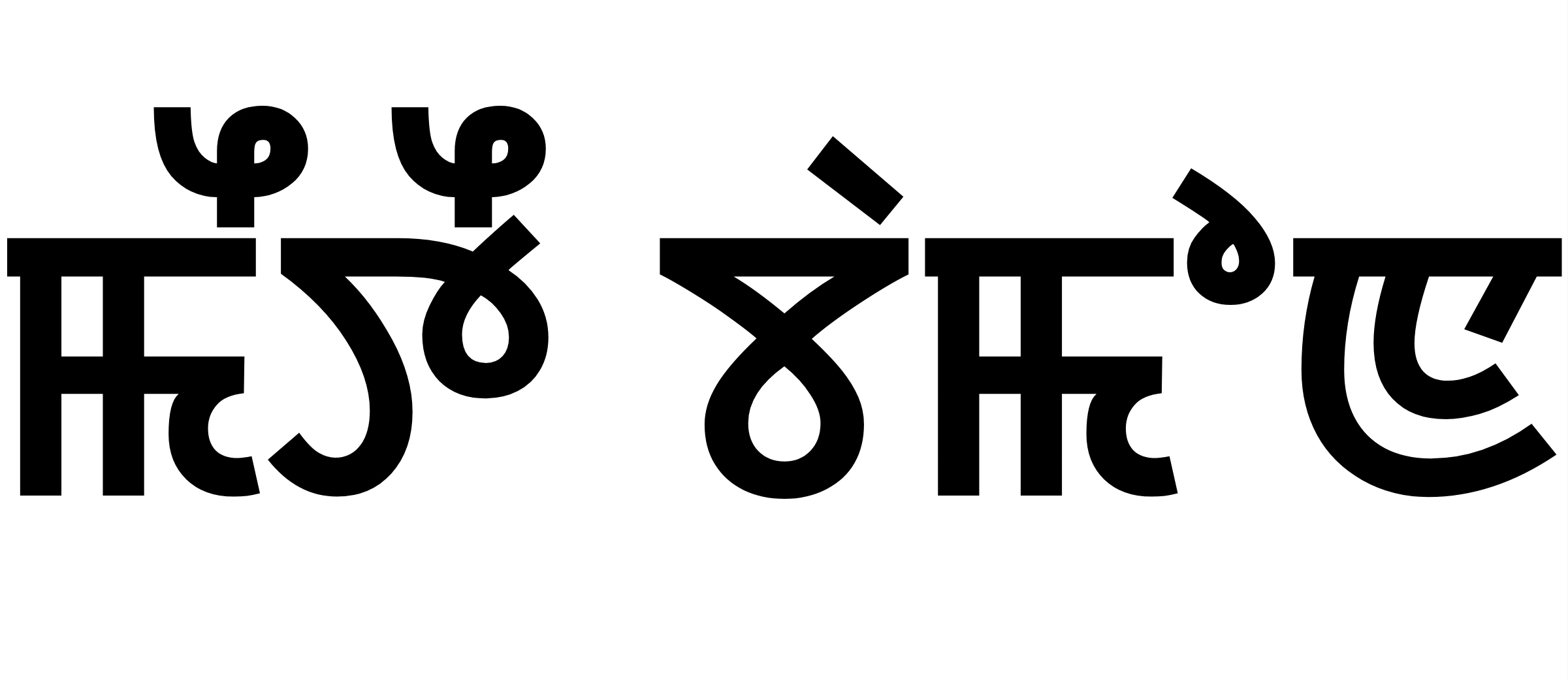
- "Meitei Bamon" (literally meaning "Meitei Brahmin" in Meitei language) written in Meitei script

Religions
- Hinduism (Manipuri Vaishnavism)

Languages
- Sanskrit (sacred), Manipuri

Manipuri Brahmins (Meitei: Manipuri Bamon) or Meitei Brahmins (Meitei: Meitei Bamon) are the Brahmins who speak the Manipuri language as their native tongue and mainly reside in the valley areas of Manipur.

== Description ==
Manipuri Brahmin origins stretch as far as Bengal, Odisha, Mithila, Uttar Pradesh, Gujarat and other parts of India. Each Brahmin family within the community belongs to a specific gotra indicating their origin.

== Ethnicity, origin and history ==
The recording of the migration of Brahmins from other parts of India, including Bengal, Mithila, Uttar Pradesh, Gujarat, and Odisha to the Manipur Valley started from the 15th century. The appearance of Brahmins in Manipur in the 15th century may be due to the rise of Muslim power in Bengal. Followed by a steady stream of Brahmin migration to Manipur who were brought in based on their requirements after the adoption of Vaishnavism in Manipur. These Brahmins learned the Manipuri language, mixed the customs they brought in with the local customs which are acceptable to Brahmin culture, later inter-marrying with the local Manipuri women, and became a part of the larger Manipuri society.

== Notable people ==
- Atombapu Sharma, Sanskrit scholar, journalist and social reformer.
