= Lists of Inuit =

The Inuit (sometimes referred to as Eskimo) are a group of culturally similar indigenous peoples inhabiting the Arctic regions of Alaska (United States), Greenland (Kingdom of Denmark), the Northwest Territories, Nunavut, Nunavik (Quebec) and Nunatsiavut (Labrador), Canada. The list has been broken down by country:

- List of American Inuit
- List of Canadian Inuit
- List of Greenlandic Inuit
