= List of American Inuit =

This is a partial list of notable American Inuit, especially Iñupiat, who largely reside in Alaska. The Arctic and subarctic dwelling Inuit (formerly referred to as Eskimo) are a group of culturally similar Indigenous peoples inhabiting Canada, Greenland and parts of Russia.

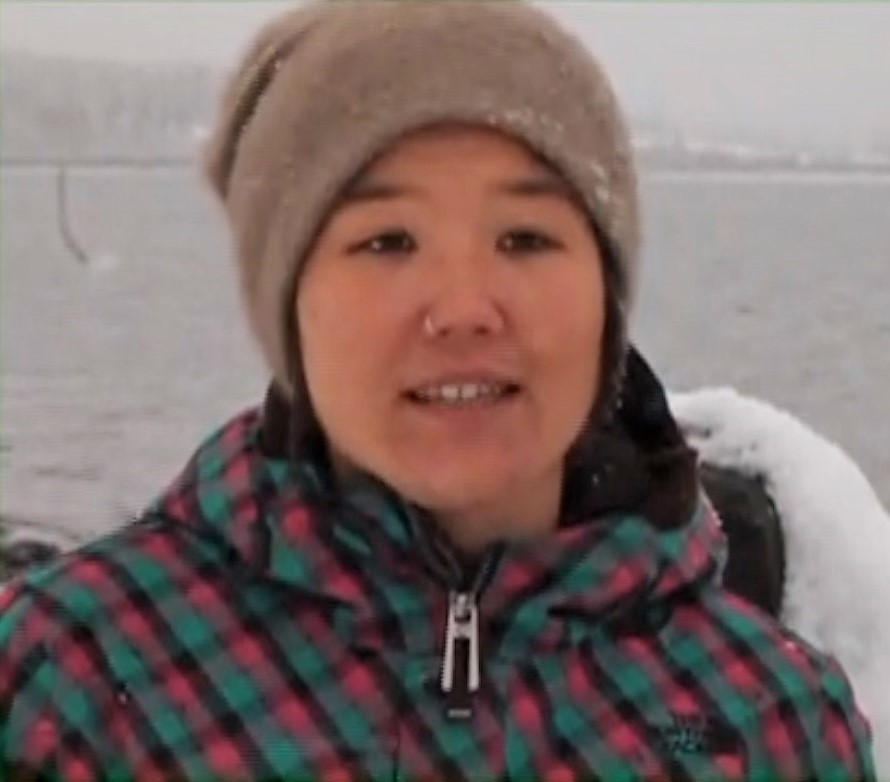
Callan Chythlook-Sifsof

- John Baker, dog musher, pilot and motivational speaker
- Irene Bedard, actor
- Ada Blackjack, castaway
- Callan Chythlook-Sifsof (born 1989), Olympic snowboarder
- Columbia Eneutseak (1893–1959), silent film actress, born at the Chicago World's Fair
- Ray Mala, actor

== See also ==
- Lists of Inuit
