= Amukta Ani =

- Theatrical release poster
- Directed by: Romi Meitei
- Screenplay by: Laishram Santosh and Romi Meitei
- Story by: Laishram Santosh and Thoi
- Produced by: Jenny Khurai
- Starring: Bala Hijam; Roshan Pheiroijam; Sushmita Mangsatabam
- Cinematography: Radhamohon
- Edited by: Johnny
- Music by: Sorri Senjam
- Production company: Ima Sana Chingjroibi Films
- Distributed by: Ima Sana Chingjroibi Films
- Release date: 11 October 2014
- Running time: 163 minutes
- Country: India
- Language: Meiteilon (Manipuri)

Amukta Ani (English: Two In One) is a 2014 Manipuri film directed by Romi Meitei and produced by Jenny Khurai. It stars Bala Hijam, Roshan Pheiroijam and Sushmita Mangsatabam in the lead roles. The story of the film was written by Laishram Santosh and Thoi, and screenplay by Romi Meitei and Laishram Santosh.

The film was released at Bhagyachandra Open Air Theatre (BOAT) on 11 October 2014 with a red-carpet event hosted by WOL Media named as Khongul.

== Plot ==
The movie is about a boy striving to earn a girl's love. Mangal is a spoilt child. Both Mangal and Thoibi study at the same school. Mangal meets Thoibi when he is fighting with the gatekeeper of the school. Since then, he follows her everywhere (including tuition centres). He even follows her to Delhi. It is a love triangle film, where Langlen comes in between Thoibi and Mangal, and the film shows how Thoibi takes all the responsibilities of misclosings and misunderstandings in the love triangle. The film also shows Thoibi and Langlen's contrasting personalities.

== Cast ==
- Bala Hijam as Thoibi
- Roshan Pheiroijam as Mangal
- Sushmita Mangsatabam as Langlen
- Ithoi Oinam as Laisna
- Gurumayum Priyogopal as Thoibi's father
- Sagolsem Dhanamanjuri as Thoibi's mother
- Khonykar Khuraijam as Mangal's father
- Thoudam Ongbi Modhubala as Mangal's mother

== Production ==
This movie is the third production of Ima Sana Chingjroibi Films, after producing Kamala-Gokul starrer Mamado Leisabido Angaobido and Shumang Leela remake of Pizza Hiktharaba Samji: Pizza. The shooting of the film was done in Manipur and New Delhi.

== Reception ==
khonjel.org wrote, "Amukta Ani tries to show the dutiful Bala with a big heart, big enough to sacrifice her love. All the characters are presented in an extreme way. The movie begins to fall when it comes into climax. I think it is because of the extreme characters."

== Soundtrack ==
Sorri Senjam composed the soundtrack for the film and Romi Meitei wrote the lyrics. The songs are titled Mensinba Ngamdraba and Musi Musi Ngalliba.

Amukta Ani

Soundtrack album by Sorri Senjam, Sushmita Mangsatabam
- Genre: Feature film soundtrack
- Length: 12:37
- Label: Ima Sana Chingjroibi Films
- Producer: Jenny Khurai

No.	Title	Lyrics	Music	Singer(s)	Length
1.	"Mensinba Ngamdraba"	Romi Meitei	Sorri Senjam	Sorri Senjam	7:20
2.	"Musi Musi Ngalliba"	Romi Meitei	Sorri Senjam	Sushmita Mangsatabam	5:17
Total length:					12:37

== See also ==
- List of Meitei-language films

== See also ==
- Romi Meitei
