= Olinda Morais =

East Timorese politician

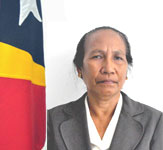
Olinda Morais small

Olinda Morais (born September 22, 1951), whose resistance name was By Mally, is a politician from East Timor. She is a member of the Democratic Party (Partido Democrático) (PD).

Morais was born in Loré, Lautém District, Portuguese Timor. She attended school only up to fourth grade. Despite this, she became a teacher. During the Indonesian occupation of East Timor, she fought against the invaders for fourteen years, until the end of 1991. Morais was married to Aluc Descart, a FALINTIL commander in the eastern region, with whom she had a son. Rather than have their 17-month-old son living in the forest with the guerillas, they sent him to be cared for by family in Lospalos; however, he was adopted by an Indonesian colonel and taken to Jakarta. Morais was not reunited with her son until 2003.

Morais was elected to the National Parliament of East Timor on 7 July 2012, and remained a member of parliament until 2017. She served as a member of the Commission for Ethics (Commission G). In the 2017 elections, she was in position 33 on the ballot, and was not re-elected.

== Awards ==
In 2011, Morais, for her part in the resistance, received the Order of Guerillas, second degree, and the certificate of honor for demobilization.
