= Biju Ningombam =

Indian actress from Manipur

- Born: 26 December, 1994; Kakwa Selungba Leikai, Manipur, India
- Occupation: Actress
- Spouse: Roshan Pheiroijam

Biju Ningombam is an Indian actress who appears in Manipuri films. Her earliest roles included a supporting role in the 2014 movie Meerang Mahum and a lead role in the 2015 film Ashileibakki Hero. Some of her films include Nungshi Feijei, Phishakhol, Nurei, Thabaton 3 and Ei Actor Natte.

== Accolades ==
Biju Ningombam was honoured with different titles at several film awards and festivals.

Award	Category	Film	Ref.
7th SSS MANIFA 2018	Best Actor in a Leading Role - Female	Phishakhol	
13th Manipur State Film Awards 2020	Special Jury Mention	Ei Actor Natte	
9th SSS MANIFA 2020	Best Actor in a Leading Role - Female	Ei Actor Natte	
14th Manipur State Film Awards 2022	Best Actor in a Leading Role - Female	Nungshi Keithel	

== Off-screen work ==
Ningombam was the face of the RaDiant Group.

== Selected filmography ==
Year	Title	Role	Director
2014	Meerang Mahum	Nganthoi's friend	Ajit Ningthouja
2015	Angangba Mayek (Pizza 2)	Pizza's friend	Dinesh Tongbram
2015	Ashileibakki Hero	Thadoi	Chou En Lai
2015	Nungshi Feijei	Mangalleima	Chou En Lai
2016	Konggol	Ayeengbi	Ajit Ningthouja
2016	Eikhoi Pabunggi	Teenager	Hemanta Khuman
2016	Nungshi Feijei 2	Mangalleima	Chou En Lai
2017	Nupi	Thaba/Leibaklei	Bobby Haobam
2017	Phishakhol	Thoibi	Jeetendra Ningomba
2017	Mani Mamou	Miranda	Ajit Ningthouja
2017	Kaongamdraba Facebook	Leishna	AK. Gyaneshori
2017	Mandalay Mathel	Sandha/Thaballei	Homeshwori
2017	Eshh.. Keinege Sidi	Leishna	Chou En Lai
2018	Nurei	Thariktha	Rakesh Moirangthem
2018	Eina Fagi Touraga	Linthoi	Ajit Ningthouja
2018	Chingda Satpi Engellei	Nungsi	Bobby Haobam
2019	Yumleima	Echantombi	Bijgupta Laishram
2019	Nongbalgee Jacket	Urirei	Bimol Phibou
2019	Inamma	Bem	Homeshwori
2019	Ibung-gee Ibemma	Sanatombi	Sanaton Nongthomba
2019	Mr. Mangal	Tampha	Ojitbabu Ningthoujam
2019	Khurai Angaobi	Thaba	Sudhir Kangjam
2019	Thabaton 3	Langlen	Bijgupta Laishram
2019	Ei Actor Natte	Rashihenbi	Homen D' Wai
2021	Khudi	Sanathoi	Tarun Wang
2021	Satlo Leirang Satlo	Leirang	Ojitbabu Ningthoujam
2021	Nungshi Keithel	Rengamla Keishing	Mangal Chabungbam
2022	Numit Tha	Keisham Leima	Sudhir Kangjam
2022	Ingen Thagi Thanil	Ingellei	Bijgupta Laishram
2022	Haidrasu Khangle		OC Meira
2022	Nongallamdaisida	Sakhenbi	O. Gautam
2022	Leiyee Ani	Thaja	Kepidas
2022	Asira Punshi	Thaballei	Bijgupta Laishram
2023	Sajibugee Leihao	Thoinu	Bijgupta Laishram
2023	2020 Gee Thoibi	Thoi	Chou En Lai
2024	Mamigi Lairembi	Ningsinghenbi	Thoiba Soibam
2025	Naitom Shatpi	Henthoibi	Thoiba Ningthou
2025	Lipun	Nungsi	Pamba (Laxma)
2025	Mamigi Lairembi 2	Ningsinghenbi	Thoiba Soibam
2025	Wari Loidri	Thadoi	Ojitbabu Ningthoujam
2026	Tamphamani	Tampha	Urmika Maibam
	Mamigi Lairembi 3	Ningshinghenbi	Thoiba Soibam
Upcoming	Samjirei	Thadoi	Rakesh Moirangthem

.
