= Khwairakpam Loken Singh =

Khwairakpam Loken Singh (Kh. Loken Singh) is a politician from Manipur, India. He is an ex-MLA and ex-Minpur (GoM). He was also president of the All Manipur Students' Union AMSU in 1984.

During the illegal immigrants agitations in Assam and northeast states in the late 1980s and early 1990s which were also spread across the other states of the northeast including Manipur, he as the leader of All Manipur Students’ Union (AMSU) along with student leaders like Sarbananda Sonowal of All Assam Students Union (AASU) spearheaded the agitation. He is the vice-President of Manipur Olympic Association (MOA). He also held the post of President Manipur Table Tennis Association.

In 2007 he was elected to the Legislative Assembly of Manipur, as the Indian National Congress candidate in the constituency Sagolband. In 2002, he had also contested the seat on behalf of INC, finishing second. In 2000 he had won the seat as a Janata Dal (Secular) candidate. In 1995, he contested as a Janata Dal candidate, finishing second.

In October 2016, he joined Bharatiya Janata Party after resigning from INC and contested Sagolband constituency in Imphal West. After many years the former student leaders of AMSU and AASU shared the same stage as friend and colleague now but on a political space. He had been elected and represented the 11 - Sagolband Assembly Constituency twice - 2000 and 2007. In the 2000–2002 he was a minister of state, Government of Manipur. In the term of 2007-2012 he held the post of Chairman PDA, Planning and Development Authority Government of Manipur.

Year	Party	Vote %	Result
2017	Bharatiya Janata Party	46.94	Runner-up (just by 19 votes)
2012	Indian National Congress	48.24	Runner-up
2007	Indian National Congress	51.22	Winner
2002	Indian National Congress	29.08	Runner-up
2000	Janata Dal (Secular)	33.03	Winner
1995	Janata Dal	23.24	Runner-up

In the 11th Manipur Assembly 2017 election he was controversially announced to be defeated by his rival by 19 votes. Even though Dr Kh Loken (BJP) got 10 more votes than his Congress rival when votes registered in EVMs were all totally counted, the rival Congress candidate managed to win Sagolband seat as he got 19 more votes after the postal ballots were taken into account. There were a total of 298 postal ballots. While Dr Loken got 126 votes from amongst the postal ballots, the rival Congress candidate secured 155 votes. An election petition has been filed against his rival at the High Court of Manipur regarding the matter.
