= Kshetrimayum Ongbi Thouranisabi Devi =

Indian classical dancer (1934–2026)

- Born: 6 November 1934; Singjamei Sapam Leikai, Manipur, British India
- Died: 12 May 2026 (aged 91); Singjamei Mathak Thokchom Leikai, Manipur, India
- Occupation: Classical dancer
- Known for: Principal, Jawaharlal Nehru Manipur Dance academy
- Spouse: Late Kshetrimayum Nawang Singh
- Children: Ksh. Ragini Devi, Ksh. Rajen Singh, Ksh. Ranibala Devi
- Parent(s): Leishangthem Tampha Singh; Leishangthem Ongbi Ibetombimacha Devi
- Awards: Padma Shri; Sangeet Natak Akademi Award; Manipur State Kala Akademi Award; Nritya Ratna Award

Kshetrimayum Ongbi Thouranisabi Devi (6 November 1934 – 12 May 2026) was an Indian classical dancer and author, who specialised in the Indian classical dance form of Manipuri. She was honoured by the Government of India in 2003 with Padma Shri, the fourth highest Indian civilian award.

== Life and career ==
Kshetrimayum Ongbi Thouranisabi Devi was born on 6 November 1934 at Singjamei Sapam Leikai, a small hamlet in the Indian state of Manipur to Leishangthem Tampha Singh, a polo player and Leishangthem Ongbi Ibetombimacha Devi, a known Nata Sankirtana exponent as their third daughter. She started stage performances at the age of 6, before she underwent any formal training. Later, she trained Ras Leela at Govindaji Nartanalaya (Government of Manipur Dance College) from the age of 10, passing the degrees, visharad and acharya and also trained under gurus such as Maishnam Amubi Singh, Amudon Sharma, H. Tomba, A. Tomba Singh, Lourembam Tombi Devi and R. K. Tomalsana before starting to perform professionally. She performed at many art festivals in India and other countries such as Canada, West Germany, the United Kingdom, Dubai and the USA.

Thouranisabi Devi was associated with Jawaharlal Nehru Manipur Dance Academy and directed one of its ballet productions, Radha Sati. She taught at the academy for several years as Guru Rasdhari, Guruhan and Pradhan Guru till her retirement in 2006. She is also credited with two books, Diva Ras (2 volumes-1993) and Ras Makha Amsung Nungi Masahk (2006), both based on Manipuri dance and recorded six albums for His Master's Voice.

She was a recipient of the Royal Robe from Maharaja Okendrajit Singh and a gold medal from the Government of Manipur. Manipur State Kala Akademi awarded her their annual award in 1977 and the Sangeet Natak Akademi followed suit with an award in 1980. Manipur Sahitya Parishad conferred the title Nritya Ratna on her in 1981. The Department of Culture, Media and Sport, Government of India awarded Senior Fellowship to her in 1987 and she received a Certificate of Honour from the Government of Manipur in 1991. The Government of India honoured her with the civilian award of Padma Shri in 2003. She was also shortlisted for Padma Bhushan in 2011 though unsuccessfully.

Thouranisabi Devi was married to Kshetrimayum Nawang Singh and the couple lived in the Manipuri capital of Imphal. She died at her residence on 12 May 2026, at the age of 91.

== See also ==
- Manipuri dance
