= Kshetri Irabot Singh =

Indian politician

Kshetri Irabot Singh was an Indian politician, from Kakching, Manipur. He was born on 8 April 1938. Irabot obtained a M.A. (Political Science) degree from Gauhati University, after which he worked as a teacher. He joined the Communist Party of India in 1965, and would become a member of its Manipur State Council and Manipur State Executive.

He was elected to the Manipur Legislative Assembly from the Kakching constituency in the 1974 election. Irabot retained the Kakching seat in the 1980 elections. He lost the Kakching seat in the 1984 election, finishing in second place. He contested the Kakching seat in the 1990 election, again finishing in second place.
