= Romi Meitei =

Screenwriter, lyricist and director

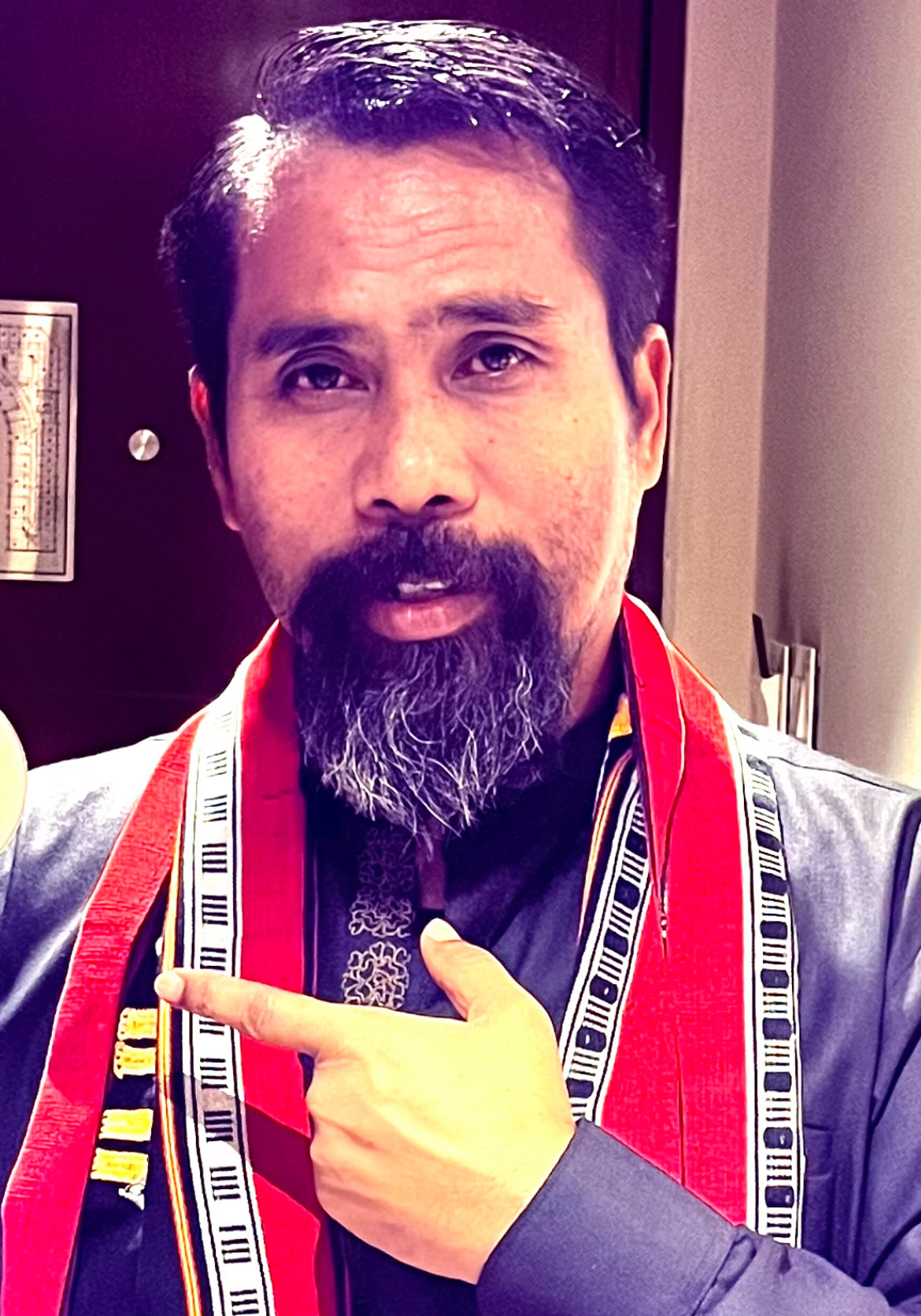
- Born: Mayanglambam Romi Meitei; Wangkhei Pukhrambam Leirak, Imphal, Manipur
- Education: Graduate, Sociology, D.M. College of Arts
- Years active: 2004-present
- Spouse: Sheetal Chingsubam
- Children: 3

Romi Meitei is an Indian film director, screenwriter and lyricist who works in Manipuri films. He is a recipient of several awards at film festivals organized in India and abroad, including a National Film Award.

Angangba Kurao Mapal, Thoiba Thoibi, Inga Nonglakta, Hiktharaba Samji: Pizza, Akhunba Mani, Khujingee Mami, Ekhenglakta Red Rose, Natephamda Tero, Chumthang Makhong, Imagi Laman Singamdre, Thengmankhre Thabalse, Mikithi and Eikhoigi Yum are some of the well-known movies he directed.

He has also made films which are adaptations of famous radio plays and Shumang Kumheis. Imagi Laman Singamdre, Yotpi, Sanagi Nga, Sangbrei Managi Chenghi Manam, Hiktharaba Samji: Pizza are among such films.

In 2017, he directed a music video titled Nura Pakhang. It is a Portuguese and Meitei language collaboration music video on the present situation of Manipuri pony. As of 2022, his feature film Eikhoigi Yum Won FIPRESCI International Federation of Film Critics Award for the best International Film and NETPAC Network for the Promotion of Asian Cinema Jury Special Mention at the 27th International Film Festival of Kerala.

== Accolades ==
Romi Meitei has won many awards for his feature and non-feature films. His 2013 movie Tabunungda Akaiba Likli swept many awards at the SSS MANIFA 2014. Noong Amadi Yeroom, his 2011 non-feature film received official selection in 42nd IFFI (International film festival of India), Indian Panorama, MIFF 2012 International competition, 2nd Best Film in Manhattan Short Film Festival and Official selection at Beyond Bollywood festival, Frankfurt. Eesing Gi Machu won the Best Film at the Brahmaputra Valley Film Festival 2016.

Yours Faithfully got official selection at Global Cinema festival by Film Federation of India. His 2019 non-feature film Motsillaba Mingsel bagged the Special Jury award at the 13th Manipur State Film Awards 2020. The film also won the Best Director and Best Child Artist awards at the Cochin International Shortfilm Awards 2021. Motsillaba Mingsel won the Grand Jury Award for Best Film and House of Illusion Award for Best Short Fiction at the Chalachitram National Film Festival 2021, held under aegis of Directorate of Film Festival and Cultural Department, Government of Assam. The film also won the Best Short Film Award at The Himalayan Film Festival 2021 held in Leh, Ladakh.

His 2021 film Eikhoigi Yum won the Best Feature Film award at the 14th Manipur State Film Festival 2022. The film also won an Audience Choice Award for Best Narrative Feature at the Indie Meme Film Festival 2023, held in Austin City, United States. At Kazan International Muslim Film Festival 2023, he won Best Director Award for the film. At the 69th National Film Awards, the film won Best Feature Film In Manipuri.

He also served as jury member at the 54th International Film Festival of India for Indian Panorama Feature Films section and Central Jury at the 70th National Film Awards

== Social work ==
Romi Meitei also contributes to social works. He is the Chairman of Mami Thawan Foundation, a non-profit foundation which provides services for the welfare of Manipur Society.

== Filmography ==
=== Selected feature films ===
Year	Title	Notes
2004	Angangba Kurao Mapal	Debut film.
2005	Thengmankhre Thabalse	A film on love, poverty and kinships.
2005	Ayukki Likla	A love triangle movie.
2006	Khuji	A multi-starrer romance drama.
2006	Inga Nonglakta	A romance genre movie.
2007	Dhrubatara	A love triangle movie.
2007	Thoiba Thoibi	A production of Nison Films. A romance drama.
2007	Akhunba Mani	A family drama.
2007	Manithoiba	A comedy-romance genre movie.
2007	Lengdaba Lan	A production of Diana Films.
2008	Da Sadananda	A heartbreaking movie on romance, health and poverty.
2008	Chumthang Makhong	A film on the insurgency movement in Manipur.
2008	Ekhenglaktagi Red Rose	A film on the insurgency movement in Manipur.
2008	Ingao Ngaona	Official selection at the 7th Manipur State Film Festival 2010.
2009	Mikithi	A movie on unrequited love.
2009	Khangdreda Nongdamba	A production of Pibarel Films. Official selection at the 7th Manipur State Film Festival 2010.
2009	Natephamda Tero	A comedy drama.
2009	Dharmagi Mingda Imagidamak	A family drama which focusses on the old aged people being neglected by his/her own children. Adapted from the famous radio serial play by Herojit Naoroibam.
2010	Imagee Ibungo	A production of Bandana Films.
2010	Imagi Laman Singamdre	A film on drug menace among the youths in Manipur.
2010	Thoudang	Screened at the Second International Women's Film Festival 2012, Shillong.
2010	Ashit Awanthada Pee Thadoi Ahum	Adapted from Herojit Naoroibam's radio play Pee Thadoi Ahum.
2010	Mamado Leisabido Angaobido	Based on Khaidem Pramodini's play of the same title.
2011	Mikithi 2	Sequel to the 2009 movie Mikithi.
2012	Khujingee Mami	
2012	Lanphamda Ibeni	Based on Kunjalal Yendrenbam's radio play of the same name.
2012	Hiktharaba Samji: Pizza	Adapted from the famous Shumang Leela Pizza by Dinesh Tongbram.
2012	Yairipok Thambalnu Amaga	
2013	Mounao Thoibi	A comedy film on consequences faced by an adolescent.
2013	Tabunungda Akaiba Likli	Received Best Director/ Best film award in SSS MANIFA 2014. A love triangle movie.
2013	Sangbrei Managi Chenghi Manam	Based on the Shumang Leela by Herojit Naoroibam.
2013	Thajagee Maihing	Based on the Shumang Leela of the same title.
2014	Amukta Ani	A love triangle movie.
2018	Sanagi Nga	Based on the famous Shumang Leela performed by IMAA.
2018	October	Worked with the Directorial team in making the movie.
2018	Yotpi	Adapted from Herojit Naoroibam's radio play of the same name.
2018	Amuktangga Haikho	A romance drama.
2021	Eikhoigi Yum	Winner of Best Manipuri Film at the 69th National Film Awards; FIPRESCI Award for the Best International Film and NETPAC Jury Special Awards at 27th IFFK; Best Director at 19th Kazan International Film Festival, Russia and Best Narrative Feature at Indie Meme Film Festival, Austin, USA. Won Best Cinematography at International Film Festival of Family & Children, Yaraslav, Russia; Best Film (Live section) at Imagine India International Film Festival, Madrid, Spain and 5 titles including Best Feature Film at the 14th Manipur State Film Awards 2022; won 3 titles at 5th Sailadhar Baruah Film Awards, Assam.
2026	Nashon Pikna	Official Selection in the Indian Cinema Now section at the 31st IFFK 2026.

=== Non-feature films ===
Year	Title	Notes
2010	Cease Baby’s Whimpering Cry	Received official selection at MIFF 2010 and SiGNS 2010.
2011	Noong Amadi Yeroom	Got official selection in 42nd IFFI Indian Panorama, MIFF 2012 International competition, 2nd Best Film in Manhattan Short Film Festival and Official selection at Beyond Bollywood festival, Frankfurt.
2012	Kaangkhada Lin	Winner of Best Director/Best Film award in BVFF 2013 and MIFF 2014 National Competition.
2013	Karfew	Won Best Director and Best Film on Social Issues Awards in MSFA 2014 and 2nd Best Film Award in BVFF 2014. Won the 2nd Prize at the National_Human_Rights_Commission_(NHRC)'s_Short_Film_Award_Competition 2022.
2015	Eesing Gi Machu (Colors of Water)	Won the Best Director & Best Film awards in MSFA, Best Director & Best Film awards in BVFF 2015 and MIFF 2016.
2018	Yours Faithfully	Winner of Best Director & Best Film awards in MSFA 2018 and official selection at Global Cinema Festival by Film Federation of India.
2019	Motsillaba Mingsel	Bagged the Special Jury Award at the 13th Manipur State Film Awards 2020. Won Best Director and Best Child Artist awards at the Cochin International Shortfilm Awards 2021. Official selection at the Lift-Off Global Network Sessions 2021. Best Short Film Award at The Himalayan Film Festival 2021.
2025	Chahi Taret Khuntakpa	Broadcast on History TV18 Channel, a historical film on seven years devastation that happened in Manipur during the period 1819–1826.
