= List of Padma Shri award recipients in literature and education =

Recipients of a civilian award in India

This is a list of recipients of the Padma Shri award in the field of Literature & Education. The Padma Shri is the fourth-highest civilian award of the Republic of India, after the Bharat Ratna, the Padma Vibhushan and the Padma Bhushan. Instituted in 1954, the award is conferred by the President of India at ceremonial functions which are held at Rashtrapati Bhavan.

As of 2025, a total of 693 individuals have been awarded Padma Shri for their contributions to literature and education.

== 1950–1959 ==
Year	Name	State	Field
1954	Satyendra Nath Bose	West Bengal	Literature and Education
1954	Arcot Lakshmanaswami Mudaliar	Tamil Nadu	Literature and Education
1954	Amarnath Jha	Uttar Pradesh	Literature and Education
1954	Josh Malihabadi	Delhi	Literature and Education
1954	Maithilisharan Gupt	Uttar Pradesh	Literature and Education
1954	Husain Ahmed Madni	Uttar Pradesh	Literature and Education
1954	Vallathol Narayana Menon	Kerala	Literature and Education
1954	Shankar Pillai	Delhi	Literature and Education
1955	Bhagwan Das	Uttar Pradesh	Literature and Education
1955	Dhondo Keshav Karve	Maharashtra	Literature and Education
1955	Pran Krushna Parija	Odisha	Literature and Education
1955	Suniti Kumar Chatterji	West Bengal	Literature and Education
1955	Maneklal Sankalchand Thacker	Karnataka	Literature and Education
1955	Krishna Kanta Handique	Assam	Literature and Education
1955	Laxminarayan Sahu	Odisha	Literature and Education
1955	Rattan Shastri	Rajasthan	Literature and Education
1956	Bhai Vir Singh	Punjab	Literature and Education
1956	Kasturi Srinivasan	Tamil Nadu	Literature and Education
1956	Rajshekhar Bose	West Bengal	Literature and Education
1956	Mahadevi Varma	Uttar Pradesh	Literature and Education
1956	Surya Kumar Bhuyan	Rajasthan	Literature and Education
1956	Sukhdev Pande	Uttarakhand	Literature and Education
1957	Abid Hussain	Uttar Pradesh	Literature and Education
1957	Bhikham Lal Atreya	Uttar Pradesh	Literature and Education
1957	Hazari Prasad Dwivedi	Uttar Pradesh	Literature and Education
1957	Siddheshwar Varma	Chandigarh	Literature and Education
1957	Govind Sakharam Sardesai	Maharashtra	Literature and Education
1957	K.A. Nilakanta Sastri	Tamil Nadu	Literature and Education
1957	Shyam Nandan Sahay	Bihar	Literature and Education
1957	Shiyali Ramamritha Ranganathan	Karnataka	Literature and Education
1957	Nalini Bala Devi	Assam	Literature and Education
1958	Kuppali Venkatappagowda Puttappa	Karnataka	Literature and Education
1958	Poola Tirupati Raju	Rajasthan	Literature and Education
1958	Surya Narayan Vyas	Madhya Pradesh	Literature and Education
1958	Maganlal Tribhuvandas Vyas	Gujarat	Literature and Education
1958	Ram Chandra Varma	Uttar Pradesh	Literature and Education
1959	John Matthai	Kerala	Literature and Education
1959	Barhgavram Vithal Warerkar	Maharashtra	Literature and Education
1959	Nirmal Kumar Sidhanta	West Bengal	Literature and Education
1959	Ramdhari Singh Dinkar	Bihar	Literature and Education
1959	Tiruppattur R. Venkatachala Murthi	Tamil Nadu	Literature and Education
1959	Komaravolu S. Chandrasekharan	Tamil Nadu	Literature and Education

== 1960–1969 ==
Year	Name	State	Field
1960	Kazi Nazrul Islam	West Bengal	Literature and Education
1960	Balakrishna Sharma Naveen	Delhi	Literature and Education
1960	Rajeshwar Shastri Dravid	Uttar Pradesh	Literature and Education
1960	Haridas Siddhanta Bagish	West Bengal	Literature and Education
1960	Shiv Pujan Sahai	Bihar	Literature and Education
1960	Artaballabha Mohanty	Odisha	Literature and Education
1960	Bellary Shamanna Kesavan	Karnataka	Literature and Education
1961	Seth Govind Das	Madhya Pradesh	Literature and Education
1961	Ardeshir Ruttonji Wadia	Maharashtra	Literature and Education
1961	Rai Krishnadasa	Uttar Pradesh	Literature and Education
1961	Sumitranandan Pant	Uttar Pradesh	Literature and Education
1961	Parsuram Misra	Odisha	Literature and Education
1961	Evangeline Lazarus	Tamil Nadu	Literature and Education
1961	Muni Shri Jin Vijayji	Rajasthan	Literature and Education
1961	Neyyadupakkam Duraiswami Sundaravadivelu	Tamil Nadu	Literature and Education
1961	Premendra Mitra	West Bengal	Literature and Education
1961	Vinayak Krishna Gokak	Karnataka	Literature and Education
1961	Vishnukant Jha	Bihar	Literature and Education
1962	Ramchandra Narayan Dandekar	Maharashtra	Literature and Education
1962	Sisir Kumar Mitra	West Bengal	Literature and Education
1962	Venkataraman Raghavan	Tamil Nadu	Literature and Education
1962	Asaf Ali Asghar Fyzee	Jammu and Kashmir	Literature and Education
1962	Gyanesh Chandra Chatterji	Delhi	Literature and Education
1962	Jafar Ali Khan	Uttar Pradesh	Literature and Education
1962	Niaz Mohd. Khan (Niaz Fatehpuri)	Uttar Pradesh	Literature and Education
1962	Narayan Sitaram Phadke	Maharashtra	Literature and Education
1962	Radhika Raman Prasad Sinha	Bihar	Literature and Education
1962	Channapatna Krishnappa Venkataramayya	Karnataka	Literature and Education
1962	Dula Bhaya Kag	Gujarat	Literature and Education
1962	Sochi Raut Roy	Odisha	Literature and Education
1962	Tarashankar Bandyopadhyay	West Bengal	Literature and Education
1963	Suniti Kumar Chatterji	West Bengal	Literature and Education
1963	Badri Nath Prasad	Uttar Pradesh	Literature and Education
1963	Ram Kumar Verma	Uttar Pradesh	Literature and Education
1963	Makhanlal Chaturvedi	Madhya Pradesh	Literature and Education
1963	Rahul Sankritayan	Uttar Pradesh	Literature and Education
1963	Trivenkata Rajendra Seshadri	Tamil Nadu	Literature and Education
1963	Rashid Ahmed Siddiqi	Delhi	Literature and Education
1963	Ahindra Chowdhury	West Bengal	Literature and Education
1964	Gopinath Kaviraj	Uttar Pradesh	Literature and Education
1964	Acharya Kakasaheb (Dattatreya Balkrishna) Kalelkar	Maharashtra	Literature and Education
1964	Sheikh Abdullah	Uttar Pradesh	Literature and Education
1964	Anukul Chandra Mukerji	Uttar Pradesh	Literature and Education
1964	Rasipuram Krishnaswami Narayan	Karnataka	Literature and Education
1964	Tushar Kanti Ghosh	West Bengal	Literature and Education
1964	Krishna Chandra Shukla	Rajasthan	Literature and Education
1965	Triguna Sen	West Bengal	Literature and Education
1965	Mohd Mujeeb	Delhi	Literature and Education
1965	Vrindavanlal Verma	Uttar Pradesh	Literature and Education
1965	Narasinh Narayan Godbole	Maharashtra	Literature and Education
1965	Tonse Madhava Anantha Pai	Karnataka	Literature and Education
1965	Anant Atmaram Kanekar	Maharashtra	Literature and Education
1965	Vishnu Namdeo Adarkar	Maharashtra	Literature and Education
1965	Rev Panavelil Thomas Chandi	Uttar Pradesh	Literature and Education
1965	Gopal Prasad Vyas	Delhi	Literature and Education
1965	John Travere Mends Gibson	Rajasthan	Literature and Education
1965	Kandathil Mammen Cherian	Kerala	Literature and Education
1966	Bhai Jodh Singh	Punjab	Literature and Education
1966	Haribhau Upadhyaya	Uttar Pradesh	Literature and Education
1966	Vinayak Sitaram Sarwate	Madhya Pradesh	Literature and Education
1966	Nirmal Kumar Bose	West Bengal	Literature and Education
1966	B. Sivamurthy Sastry	Karnataka	Literature and Education
1966	Harishankar Sharma	Uttar Pradesh	Literature and Education
1966	Inderjit Singh Tulsi	Delhi	Literature and Education
1966	Poddar Ramavtar Arun	Maharashtra	Literature and Education
1966	Purushottam Laxman Deshpande	Maharashtra	Literature and Education
1966	Rajeshwar Nath Zutshi	Madhya Pradesh	Literature and Education
1966	Sayyid Ahmadullah Qadri	Telangana	Literature and Education
1967	Dadasaheb Chintamani Pavate	Karnataka	Literature and Education
1967	Khwaja Ghulam Saiyidain	Uttar Pradesh	Literature and Education
1967	Telliavaram Mahadevan Ponnambalam Mahadevan	Tamil Nadu	Literature and Education
1967	Akshay Kumar Jain	Delhi	Literature and Education
1967	Asoke Kumar Sarkar	West Bengal	Literature and Education
1967	Benegal Shiva Rao	Delhi	Literature and Education
1967	Datto Vaman Potdar	Maharashtra	Literature and Education
1967	Kalyanji Vithalbhai Mehta	Gujarat	Literature and Education
1967	Krishna Kanta Handique	Assam	Literature and Education
1967	Mulk Raj Anand	Maharashtra	Literature and Education
1967	Puthenpurayil Mathew Joseph	Kerala	Literature and Education
1967	Ali Sardar Jafri	Maharashtra	Literature and Education
1967	Balkrishna Bhagwant Borkar	Goa	Literature and Education
1967	Chandravadan Chimanlal Mehta	Gujarat	Literature and Education
1967	Mayadhar Mansinha	Odisha	Literature and Education
1967	Prabhjot Kaur	Delhi	Literature and Education
1968	Prasanta Chandra Mahalanobis	Delhi	Literature and Education
1968	Acharya Vishva Bandhu	Uttar Pradesh	Literature and Education
1968	Kota Shivaram Karanth	Karnataka	Literature and Education
1968	Mariadas Ruthnaswamy	Tamil Nadu	Literature and Education
1968	Sudhir Ranjan Sen Gupta	West Bengal	Literature and Education
1968	Gopalan Narasimhan	Tamil Nadu	Literature and Education
1968	Govinda Kurup Shankara Kurup	Kerala	Literature and Education
1968	Mamidipudi Venkatarangayya	Andhra Pradesh	Literature and Education
1968	Manchakkattuvalasu Palanivelappa Gounder Periaswamy Thooran	Tamil Nadu	Literature and Education
1968	Manukonda Cholapathi Rao	Andhra Pradesh	Literature and Education
1968	Radhanath Rath	Odisha	Literature and Education
1968	Raghupati Sahai 'Firaq'	Uttar Pradesh	Literature and Education
1968	Shripad Damodar Satwalekar	Maharashtra	Literature and Education
1968	Vishnu Sakharam Khandekar	Maharashtra	Literature and Education
1968	Akhtar Mohiuddin	Jammu and Kashmir	Literature and Education
1968	Balasaheb Amgonda Patil	Maharashtra	Literature and Education
1968	Dattetreya Ramachandra Bendre	Karnataka	Literature and Education
1968	Kedar Ghosh	West Bengal	Literature and Education
1969	Narayan Bhikaji Parulekar	Maharashtra	Literature and Education
1969	Niharranjan Ray	West Bengal	Literature and Education
1969	Tarasankar Bandyopadhyay	West Bengal	Literature and Education
1969	Haroon Khan Sherwani	Andhra Pradesh	Literature and Education
1969	Gobind Behari Lal	United States of America	Literature and Education
1969	Krishna Chander	Maharashtra	Literature and Education
1969	Krishna Ramchand Kriplani	Delhi	Literature and Education
1969	Raja Rao	United States of America	Literature and Education
1969	Raman Madhavan Nair	Chandigarh	Literature and Education
1969	Samad Yar Khan Saghar Nizami	Uttar Pradesh	Literature and Education
1969	Vithalbhai Jhaveri	Maharashtra	Literature and Education
1969	Yeshwant Dinkar Pendharkar	Maharashtra	Literature and Education
1969	Tarapada Basu	United Kingdom	Literature and Education
1969	Brahm Nath Datta 'Qasir'	West Bengal	Literature and Education
1969	Gajanan Digambar Madgulkar	Maharashtra	Literature and Education
1969	Mahendra Nath Kapur	Punjab	Literature and Education
1969	Pandurang Vasudeo Gadgil	Maharashtra	Literature and Education
1969	Shyam Lal Gupta	Delhi	Literature and Education
1969	Srinivasa Natarajan	Tamil Nadu	Literature and Education
1969	Surendra Nath Ghosh	Uttar Pradesh	Literature and Education
1969	Thiagarajan Muthian	Tamil Nadu	Literature and Education
1969	Vairamuthu Pillai Subbiah Pillai	Tamil Nadu	Literature and Education
1969	Amrita Pritam	Delhi	Literature and Education

== 1970–1979 ==
Year	Name	State	Field
1970	Tara Chand	Uttar Pradesh	Literature and Education
1970	Amiya Chakravarty	West Bengal	Literature and Education
1970	Birendra Nath Ganguli	Delhi	Literature and Education
1970	Purushottam Kashinath Kelkar	Maharashtra	Literature and Education
1970	Syed Abdul Latif	Andhra Pradesh	Literature and Education
1970	Viswanatha Satyanarayana	Andhra Pradesh	Literature and Education
1970	Buddhadeva Bose	West Bengal	Literature and Education
1970	Gurram Joshuva	Andhra Pradesh	Literature and Education
1970	Yashpal	Punjab	Literature and Education
1970	Ratan Lal Joshi	Delhi	Literature and Education
1970	Tiuper Subramaniam Avinashillingam Chettiar	Tamil Nadu	Literature and Education
1970	Vivekananda Mukhopadhyaya	West Bengal	Literature and Education
1970	Chandran David S. Devanasan	Tamil Nadu	Literature and Education
1970	P. Narasimhayya	Karnataka	Literature and Education
1970	Vadlamudi Venkata Rao	Assam	Literature and Education
1970	Miss Lilian Godfreda Lutter	Madhya Pradesh	Literature and Education
1970	Pandita Sumatiben Nemchand Shah	Maharashtra	Literature and Education
1970	Ananda Chandra Barua	Assam	Literature and Education
1970	Din Dayal	Punjab	Literature and Education
1970	Kumud Ranjan Mallick	West Bengal	Literature and Education
1970	Kunnenkeril K. Jacob	Maharashtra	Literature and Education
1970	P. Lal	West Bengal	Literature and Education
1970	Phaneshwar Nath Renu	Bihar	Literature and Education
1970	Siddheshwar Shastri Chitrao	Maharashtra	Literature and Education
1970	Sikander Ali Wjad	Maharashtra	Literature and Education
1970	Sohan Lal Dwivedi	Uttar Pradesh	Literature and Education
1970	Weer Rajendra Rishi	Punjab	Literature and Education
1970	Syed Masud Hasan Rizvi	Uttar Pradesh	Literature and Education
1971	Veni Shankar Jha	Madhya Pradesh	Literature and Education
1971	Anant Vithal alias Dhananjay Keer	Maharashtra	Literature and Education
1971	Bhagwati Charan Verma	Uttar Pradesh	Literature and Education
1971	Jainendra Kumar Jain	Delhi	Literature and Education
1971	Kalindi Charan Panigrahi	Odisha	Literature and Education
1971	Kandathil Mammon Cherian	Kerala	Literature and Education
1971	Namakkal Venkatarama Ramalingam Pillai	Tamil Nadu	Literature and Education
1971	Suraj Bhan	Chandigarh	Literature and Education
1971	Miss Grace Mary Linnell (Posthumous)	Uttarakhand	Literature and Education
1971	Ratan Shankar Mishra	Uttar Pradesh	Literature and Education
1971	Rev. Mother Theodosia	Karnataka	Literature and Education
1971	Abdul Haye 'Sahir Ludhianvi'	Maharashtra	Literature and Education
1971	Atma Ram Bhatt	Maharashtra	Literature and Education
1971	Atul Chandra Hazarika	Assam	Literature and Education
1971	Chinganbam Kalachand Shastri	Manipur	Literature and Education
1971	Ghulam Rabbani Taban	Delhi	Literature and Education
1971	Kothamanglam Subbu	Tamil Nadu	Literature and Education
1971	Labhu Ram 'Josh Malsiani'	Punjab	Literature and Education
1971	Narayan Gopal Thakar	Maharashtra	Literature and Education
1971	Nirmal Chandra Sinha	Sikkim	Literature and Education
1971	Pramatha Nath Bishi	West Bengal	Literature and Education
1971	Suresh Singh	Uttar Pradesh	Literature and Education
1971	Syed Mohd. Mirza Mohazzab	Uttar Pradesh	Literature and Education
1971	Sheila Bhatia	Delhi	Literature and Education
1971	Kum. Sulabha Panandikar	Maharashtra	Literature and Education
1972	Hormusji Maneckji Seervai	Maharashtra	Literature and Education
1972	Pran Nath Chhutani	Chandigarh	Literature and Education
1972	Krishnaswami Swaminathan	Delhi	Literature and Education
1972	Adya Rangacharya	Karnataka	Literature and Education
1972	Pothen Philip	Maharashtra	Literature and Education
1972	Syam Nandan Prasad Kishore	Bihar	Literature and Education
1972	Virendra Verma	Uttar Pradesh	Literature and Education
1972	Bhawani Prasad Tiwari	Madhya Pradesh	Literature and Education
1972	Dharam Vir Bharati	Maharashtra	Literature and Education
1972	Jagan Nath Krishan Kate	Madhya Pradesh	Literature and Education
1972	Mylai Ponnuswamy Sivagnanam	Tamil Nadu	Literature and Education
1972	Phool Chand Chowdhary	Delhi	Literature and Education
1972	Puttaparthi Narayanacharya	Andhra Pradesh	Literature and Education
1972	Rajindra Singh Bedi	Maharashtra	Literature and Education
1972	Shalil Ghosh	Maharashtra	Literature and Education
1972	Badal Sarkar	West Bengal	Literature and Education
1972	Vedakantara Subramania Krishnan	Madhya Pradesh	Literature and Education
1972	Vidya Nath Langer	Delhi	Literature and Education
1973	Banarsi Dass Chaturvedi	Uttar Pradesh	Literature and Education
1973	Harindranath Chattopadhyaya	Telangana	Literature and Education
1973	Kunjuraman Sukumaran	Kerala	Literature and Education
1973	Pothen Joseph	Kerala	Literature and Education
1973	Bhoi Bheemanna	Telangana	Literature and Education
1973	Mohamed Abdul Khader Malik Mohamed	Kerala	Literature and Education
1973	Balwant Gargi	Chandigarh	Literature and Education
1973	Ranjit Ramchandrarao Desai	Maharashtra	Literature and Education
1973	Salam Machhlisheri	Delhi	Literature and Education
1973	Shyam Lal Gupta 'Parshad'	Uttar Pradesh	Literature and Education
1973	Coover Bai Jehangir Vakil	Maharashtra	Literature and Education
1974	Camille Bulcke	Belgium	Literature and Education
1974	Devanahalli Venkataramaiah Gundappa	Karnataka	Literature and Education
1974	Vasant Shankar Huzurbazar	Maharashtra	Literature and Education
1974	Bhupati Mohan Sen	West Bengal	Literature and Education
1974	Jayant Pandurang Naik	Maharashtra	Literature and Education
1974	Khushwant Singh	Punjab	Literature and Education
1974	Sukhlal Sanghavi	Gujarat	Literature and Education
1974	Maheswar Neog	Assam	Literature and Education
1974	Shiv Mangal Singh Summan	Madhya Pradesh	Literature and Education
1974	Father Thomas V. Kunnunkal	Kerala	Literature and Education
1974	Anant Gopal Sheorey	Maharashtra	Literature and Education
1974	Ishrat Ali Siddiqui	Uttar Pradesh	Literature and Education
1974	Kaifi Azmi	Uttar Pradesh	Literature and Education
1974	Qazi Abdus Sattar	Uttar Pradesh	Literature and Education
1974	Satyanarayan Rajguru	Odisha	Literature and Education
1975	(Smt.) Premlila Vithaldas Thackersey	Maharashtra	Literature and Education
1975	Basanti Dulal Nag Chaudhuri	West Bengal	Literature and Education
1975	Pratul Chandra Gupta	West Bengal	Literature and Education
1975	Vasudev Vishnu Mirashi	Maharashtra	Literature and Education
1975	Kirpal Singh Narang	Punjab	Literature and Education
1975	Balai Chand Mukhopadhyaya	West Bengal	Literature and Education
1975	Mahadeo Lalji Shahare	Delhi	Literature and Education
1975	Bachubhai Ravat	Gujarat	Literature and Education
1975	Jatindra Mohan Dutta	West Bengal	Literature and Education
1975	Mathew M. Kuzhiveli (Posthumous)	Kerala	Literature and Education
1976	Col. Bashir Hussain Zaidi	Delhi	Literature and Education
1976	Kalu Lal Shrimali	Uttar Pradesh	Literature and Education
1976	Giani Gurmukh Singh 'Musafir' (Posthumous)	Punjab	Literature and Education
1976	Ennacal Chandy George Sudarshan	United States of America	Literature and Education
1976	Harivansh Rai Bachchan	Uttar Pradesh	Literature and Education
1976	Nava Kanta Barua	Assam	Literature and Education
1976	Devulapalli Venkata Krishna Sastry	Andhra Pradesh	Literature and Education
1976	Laxman Shastri Joshi	Maharashtra	Literature and Education
1976	Begum Mumtaz Mirza	Delhi	Literature and Education
1976	Krishna Chandra Panigrahi	Odisha	Literature and Education
1976	Manickam Narayanan	Tamil Nadu	Literature and Education
1976	Raghubhai Morarji Nayak	United Kingdom	Literature and Education
1976	Attipat Krishnaswamy Ramanujan	United States of America	Literature and Education
1976	Keshavaram Kashiram Shastri	Gujarat	Literature and Education
1976	Syed Bashiruddin	Uttar Pradesh	Literature and Education
1976	Mohd. Shafi Khan 'Bekal' Utsahi	Uttar Pradesh	Literature and Education
1976	Mukutdhar Pande	Chhattisgarh	Literature and Education
1976	Mulk Raj Saraf	Jammu and Kashmir	Literature and Education
1976	Asha Purna Devi	West Bengal	Literature and Education
1976	Gertrude Emerson Sen	United States of America	Literature and Education
1976	Ismat Chughtai	Maharashtra	Literature and Education
1976	M. K. Binodini Devi	Manipur	Literature and Education
1977	Harish-Chandra	United States of America	Literature and Education
1977	Thenpattinam Ponnusamy Meenakshi Sundaran	Tamil Nadu	Literature and Education
1977	Yusuf Husain Khan	Delhi	Literature and Education
1977	Kailas Nath Kaul	Uttar Pradesh	Literature and Education
1977	(Smt.) Madhuri Ratilal Shah	Maharashtra	Literature and Education
1977	Cingireddy Narayana Reddy	Telangana	Literature and Education
1977	Devendra Satyarthi	Delhi	Literature and Education
1977	Pritish Nandy	West Bengal	Literature and Education
1977	Sita Ram Lalas	Rajasthan	Literature and Education
1977	Tambarhalli Subramanya Satyan	Delhi	Literature and Education
1977	Evelyn Norah Shullai	Meghalaya	Literature and Education
1977	Indira Miri	Assam	Literature and Education

== 1980–1989 ==
Year	Name	State	Field
1980	Rai Krishnadasa	Uttar Pradesh	Literature and Education
1981	Amritlal Nagar	Uttar Pradesh	Literature and Education
1981	Gopinath Mohanty	Odisha	Literature and Education
1981	Krishna Datta Bharadwaj	Delhi	Literature and Education
1981	Ram Partabrai Panjwani	Maharashtra	Literature and Education
1981	Abid Ali Khan	Andhra Pradesh	Literature and Education
1981	Kunwar Singh Negi	Uttarakhand	Literature and Education
1982	Acharya Pudukkottai Nattar Pattabhirama Sastri	Uttar Pradesh	Literature and Education
1982	Stella Kramrisch	United States of America	Literature and Education
1982	Jhabar Mall Sharma	Rajasthan	Literature and Education
1982	Sher Singh 'Sher'	Chandigarh	Literature and Education
1982	Kalimuddin Ahmed	Bihar	Literature and Education
1982	Raghunath Vishnu Pandit	Goa	Literature and Education
1982	Vaikom Muhammad Basheer	Kerala	Literature and Education
1982	Gaura Pant 'Shivani'	Uttar Pradesh	Literature and Education
1983	Nagendra	Delhi	Literature and Education
1983	K. Gopalaiyer Ramanathan	Maharashtra	Literature and Education
1983	Subodh Chandra Sen Gupta	West Bengal	Literature and Education
1983	Benudhar Sharma	Assam	Literature and Education
1983	Raghuvir Sharan 'Mitra'	Uttar Pradesh	Literature and Education
1983	Miss Ahalya Chari	Tamil Nadu	Literature and Education
1983	Attar Singh	Chandigarh	Literature and Education
1983	Amitabha Chaudhuri	West Bengal	Literature and Education
1983	Hundraj Lilaram Manik 'Dukhayal'	Gujarat	Literature and Education
1983	Komal Kothari	Rajasthan	Literature and Education
1983	Saliha Abid Husain	Delhi	Literature and Education
1984	Acharya Baladeva Upadhyaya	Uttar Pradesh	Literature and Education
1984	Ganda Singh	Punjab	Literature and Education
1984	Hanumanthappa Narasimhaiah	Karnataka	Literature and Education
1984	Ishwari Prasad	Uttar Pradesh	Literature and Education
1984	Miss Marie Seton	United Kingdom	Literature and Education
1984	Horace Alexander	United States of America	Literature and Education
1984	Kotta Satchidananda Murty	Andhra Pradesh	Literature and Education
1984	Pt. Shri Narayana Chaturvedi	Uttar Pradesh	Literature and Education
1984	Sadhu Singh Hamdard	Punjab	Literature and Education
1984	Miss Qurratulain Hyder	Uttar Pradesh	Literature and Education
1984	Shanta Kalidas Gandhi	Maharashtra	Literature and Education
1984	Ganapatrao Govindrao Jadhav	Maharashtra	Literature and Education
1984	John Arthur King Martyn	Uttarakhand	Literature and Education
1984	Kshem Chandra 'Suman'	Delhi	Literature and Education
1984	Mayangnokcha Ao	Nagaland	Literature and Education
1984	Suranad P.N. Kunjan Pillai	Kerala	Literature and Education
1984	Syed Abdul Malik	Assam	Literature and Education
1984	Lakshmi Kumari Chundawat	Rajasthan	Literature and Education
1985	Rais Ahmed	Delhi	Literature and Education
1985	Gurbachan Singh Talib	Punjab	Literature and Education
1985	Shiba Prasad Chatterjee	West Bengal	Literature and Education
1985	Tribhuvandas Purushottamdas Luhar 'Sundaram'	Puducherry	Literature and Education
1985	Thakazhi Sivasankara Pillai	Kerala	Literature and Education
1985	Vuppuluri Ganapathi Sastry	Telangana	Literature and Education
1985	Bharat Mishra	Bihar	Literature and Education
1985	Syed Hasan Askari	Bihar	Literature and Education
1985	Ashangbam Minaketan Singh	Manipur	Literature and Education
1985	Hari Shankar Parsai	Madhya Pradesh	Literature and Education
1985	James Dokhuma	Mizoram	Literature and Education
1985	Prabhulal Garg (Kaka Hathrasi)	Uttar Pradesh	Literature and Education
1986	(Smt.) Chitra Jayant Naik	Maharashtra	Literature and Education
1986	Abdur Rahman	Delhi	Literature and Education
1986	Binode Kanungo	Odisha	Literature and Education
1986	Raghunath Sharma	Uttar Pradesh	Literature and Education
1986	Nuchhungi Renthlei	Mizoram	Literature and Education
1987	Annada Sankar Ray	West Bengal	Literature and Education
1987	Nalapat Balamani Amma	Kerala	Literature and Education
1987	Debiprasanna Pattanayak	Karnataka	Literature and Education
1987	Nazir Ahmad	Uttar Pradesh	Literature and Education
1987	Vanaja Iyengar	Andhra Pradesh	Literature and Education
1987	Sant Singh Sekhon	Punjab	Literature and Education
1987	Abdus Sattar	Assam	Literature and Education
1987	Khelchandra Singh Ningthoukhongjam	Manipur	Literature and Education
1987	Khawlkungi	Mizoram	Literature and Education
1988	Kuppali Venkatappagowda Puttappa	Karnataka	Literature and Education
1988	Mahadevi Varma (Posthumous)	Uttar Pradesh	Literature and Education
1988	Bal Ram Nanda	Delhi	Literature and Education
1988	Kartar Singh Duggal	Delhi	Literature and Education
1988	Karimpumannil Mathai George	Kerala	Literature and Education
1988	Vidya Niwas Misra	Uttar Pradesh	Literature and Education
1988	Nissim Ezekiel	Maharashtra	Literature and Education
1988	Ali Jawad Zaidi	Uttar Pradesh	Literature and Education
1988	Madaram Brahma	Assam	Literature and Education
1988	Mario De Miranda	Maharashtra	Literature and Education
1989	Mukut Vehari Mathur	Rajasthan	Literature and Education
1989	Girilal Jain	Delhi	Literature and Education
1989	Barsane Lal Chaturvedi	Delhi	Literature and Education
1989	Kalim Ahmed Ajiz	Bihar	Literature and Education
1989	V. Venkatachalam	Uttar Pradesh	Literature and Education
1989	Moti Lal Razdan Saqi	Jammu and Kashmir	Literature and Education
1989	Rong Bong Terang	Assam	Literature and Education
1989	Anita Desai	Delhi	Literature and Education

== 1990–1999 ==
Year	Name	State	Field
1990	Bhabatosh Datta	West Bengal	Literature and Education
1990	Sattaiyappa Dhandapani Desikar	Tamil Nadu	Literature and Education
1990	Sukumar Sen	West Bengal	Literature and Education
1990	Bimal Krishna Matilal	United Kingdom	Literature and Education
1990	Hirendra Nath Mukerjee	West Bengal	Literature and Education
1990	Trilochan Pradhan	Odisha	Literature and Education
1990	Arun Shourie	Delhi	Literature and Education
1990	Closepet Dasappa Narasimhaiah	Karnataka	Literature and Education
1990	Kunwar Singh Negi	Uttarakhand	Literature and Education
1990	Narasimhan Ram	Tamil Nadu	Literature and Education
1990	Muthukumaraswamy Aram	Tamil Nadu	Literature and Education
1990	Shyam Singh Shashi	Delhi	Literature and Education
1990	Guru Aribam Surchand Sharma	Manipur	Literature and Education
1990	(Dr.) Gopi Chand Narang	Delhi	Literature and Education
1990	Anjan Kumar Banerji	Uttar Pradesh	Literature and Education
1990	Ashin Das Gupta	West Bengal	Literature and Education
1990	Ram Nath Shastri	Jammu and Kashmir	Literature and Education
1990	Barjinder Singh	Punjab	Literature and Education
1990	Behram Pirojshaw Contractor	Maharashtra	Literature and Education
1990	Dagadu Maruti Pawar alias Daya Pawar	Maharashtra	Literature and Education
1990	Kanhaiya Lal Misra 'Prabhakar'	Uttar Pradesh	Literature and Education
1990	Madhav Yeshwant Gadkari	Maharashtra	Literature and Education
1990	Nilmani Phookan	Assam	Literature and Education
1990	Radha Mohan Gadanayak	Odisha	Literature and Education
1990	Sharad Joshi	Maharashtra	Literature and Education
1990	Vijay Kumar Chopra	Punjab	Literature and Education
1990	Yashpal Jain	Delhi	Literature and Education
1991	Indraprasad Gordhanbhai Patel	Gujarat	Literature and Education
1991	Rajaram Shastri	Delhi	Literature and Education
1991	Al-I-Ahmad Suroor	Uttar Pradesh	Literature and Education
1991	Kuthur Ramakrishnan Srinivasan	Tamil Nadu	Literature and Education
1991	Vishnu Vaman Shirwadkar alias Kusumagraj	Maharashtra	Literature and Education
1991	(Ms.) Shareefunnisa Begum Ansari	Telangana	Literature and Education
1991	Kapil Deva Dvivedi	Uttar Pradesh	Literature and Education
1991	Madan Lal Madhu	Russia	Literature and Education
1991	Purohita Thirunarayana Iyengar Narasimhachar	Karnataka	Literature and Education
1991	Sardar Anjum	Punjab	Literature and Education
1991	Syed Hasan	Bihar	Literature and Education
1991	Vishnu Bhikaji Kolte	Maharashtra	Literature and Education
1991	Bellur Krishnamachar Sunderraja Iyengar	Karnataka	Literature and Education
1991	Gopal Das Neeraj	Uttar Pradesh	Literature and Education
1991	Keshav Malik	Delhi	Literature and Education
1991	Namdeo Dhondo Mahanor	Maharashtra	Literature and Education
1991	R.K. Lalhluna	Mizoram	Literature and Education
1991	Ramanarayan Upadhyay	Madhya Pradesh	Literature and Education
1991	Rameshwar Singh Kashyap	Bihar	Literature and Education
1991	Satis Chandra Kakati	Assam	Literature and Education
1991	Shadi Lal Dhawan	Delhi	Literature and Education
1991	Surendra Mohanty	Odisha	Literature and Education
1991	Shila Jhunjhunwala	Delhi	Literature and Education
1992	Govinddas Shroff	Maharashtra	Literature and Education
1992	Laxmanshastri Balaji Joshi	Maharashtra	Literature and Education
1992	Cingireddy Narayana Reddy	Telangana	Literature and Education
1992	Dalsukh Dahyabhai Malvania	Gujarat	Literature and Education
1992	Setu Madhava Rao Pagadi	Maharashtra	Literature and Education
1992	Syed Abdul Malik	Assam	Literature and Education
1992	(Kum.) Esther Abrham Solomon	Gujarat	Literature and Education
1992	(Smt.) Rajammal Packiyanathan Devadas	Tamil Nadu	Literature and Education
1992	Moirangtham Kirti Singh	Manipur	Literature and Education
1992	Vishnu Ganesh Bhide	Maharashtra	Literature and Education
1992	Mir Mushtaq Ahmed	Delhi	Literature and Education
1992	Laxmi Narayan Dubey	Madhya Pradesh	Literature and Education
1992	Saiyid Amir Hasan Abidi	Delhi	Literature and Education
1992	Vangalampalayam Chellappagounder Kulandai Swamy	Delhi	Literature and Education
1992	Vasant Shankar Kanetkar	Maharashtra	Literature and Education
1992	Bal Krishen Thapar	Delhi	Literature and Education
1992	Gulabdas Harjivandas Broken	Maharashtra	Literature and Education
1992	Krishnan Krishnan Nair alias Krishna Chaitanya	Delhi	Literature and Education
1992	Nilkanth Yeshwant Khadilkar	Maharashtra	Literature and Education
1992	Nisith Ranjan Ray	West Bengal	Literature and Education
1992	Ram Sarup Lugani	Delhi	Literature and Education
1992	William Mark Tully	Delhi	Literature and Education
1992	Sundari Krishnalal Shridharani	Delhi	Literature and Education
1998	Bhisham Sahni	Delhi	Literature and Education
1998	Udupi Rajagopalachar Ananthamurthy	Karnataka	Literature and Education
1998	Debi Prasad Chattopadhyaya	West Bengal	Literature and Education
1998	Hari Krishan Sua	Delhi	Literature and Education
1998	K. M. Mathew	Kerala	Literature and Education
1998	Brijinder Nath Goswamy	Chandigarh	Literature and Education
1998	Gurdial Singh	Punjab	Literature and Education
1998	Narayan Gangaram Surve	Maharashtra	Literature and Education
1998	Ottaplakkal Neelakanta Velu Kurup	Kerala	Literature and Education
1998	Lalsangzuali Sailo	Mizoram	Literature and Education
1999	Amartya Sen	United Kingdom	Literature and Education
1999	Sarvepalli Gopal	Tamil Nadu	Literature and Education
1999	Shivmangal Singh Suman	Madhya Pradesh	Literature and Education
1999	Vidya Niwas Misra	Uttar Pradesh	Literature and Education
1999	Dominic Chacko Kizhakemuri (Posthumous)	Kerala	Literature and Education
1999	Bashir Badr	Madhya Pradesh	Literature and Education
1999	Kanhaiya Lal Nandan	Delhi	Literature and Education
1999	Satya Vrat Shastri	Delhi	Literature and Education
1999	Asis Datta	Delhi	Literature and Education
1999	Gian Parkash Chopra	Delhi	Literature and Education
1999	Namdev Dhasal	Maharashtra	Literature and Education
1999	Rajkumar Jhalajit Singh	Manipur	Literature and Education
1999	Ruskin Bond	Uttarakhand	Literature and Education
1999	Shayama Chona	Delhi	Literature and Education

== 2000–2009 ==
Year	Name	State	Field
2000	Jagdish Natwarlal Bhagwati	United States of America	Literature and Education
2000	Kakkadan Nandanath Raj	Kerala	Literature and Education
2000	Rasipuram Krishnaswami Narayan	Tamil Nadu	Literature and Education
2000	Holenarasipur Yoganarasimham Sharada Prasad	Delhi	Literature and Education
2000	Mandan Mishra	Delhi	Literature and Education
2000	Grigoriy Lvovitch Bondarevsky	Russia	Literature and Education
2000	Abdur Rahman Rahi	Jammu and Kashmir	Literature and Education
2000	Late Shri Elangbam Nilakanta Singh (Posthumous)	Manipur	Literature and Education
2000	Kalika Prasad Saxena	Uttar Pradesh	Literature and Education
2000	Pahlira Sena Chawngthu	Mizoram	Literature and Education
2000	Nabaneeta Dev Sen	West Bengal	Literature and Education
2000	Piloo Nowshir Jungalwalla	Delhi	Literature and Education
2001	John Kenneth Galbraith	United States of America	Literature and Education
2001	Kotta Satchidananda Murty	Andhra Pradesh	Literature and Education
2001	Boyi Bhimanna	Telangana	Literature and Education
2001	Karimpumannil Mathai George	Kerala	Literature and Education
2001	Shiv Kumar Kumar	Telangana	Literature and Education
2001	Aroon Purie	Delhi	Literature and Education
2001	Bhabendra Nath Saikia	Assam	Literature and Education
2001	Chandrashekhara Kambara	Karnataka	Literature and Education
2001	Devegowda Javaregowda	Karnataka	Literature and Education
2001	Ravindra Kumar	Uttar Pradesh	Literature and Education
2001	Gnanananda Kavi	Andhra Pradesh	Literature and Education
2001	Bala V. Balachandran	United States of America	Literature and Education
2001	Kalidas Gupta Riza	Maharashtra	Literature and Education
2001	Keshavkumar Chintaman Ketkar	Maharashtra	Literature and Education
2001	Khalid Abdul Hamid Ansari	Maharashtra	Literature and Education
2001	Manoj Das	Puducherry	Literature and Education
2001	Vachnesh Tripathi	Uttar Pradesh	Literature and Education
2001	Jeelani Bano	Telangana	Literature and Education
2001	Padma Sachdev	Delhi	Literature and Education
2002	Chakravarthi Rangarajan	Telangana	Literature and Education
2002	Bellur Krishnamachar Sundara Raja Iyengar	Maharashtra	Literature and Education
2002	Mario Miranda	Goa	Literature and Education
2002	Nirmal Verma	Delhi	Literature and Education
2002	Yevgeni Petrovich Chelyshev	Russia	Literature and Education
2002	Ashok Ramchandra Kelkar	Maharashtra	Literature and Education
2002	Munirathna Anandakrishnan	Tamil Nadu	Literature and Education
2002	Turlapaty Kutumba Rao	Andhra Pradesh	Literature and Education
2002	Dimitris C. Velissaropoulos	Greece	Literature and Education
2002	Gopal Chhotray	Delhi	Literature and Education
2002	Gyan Chand Jain	Delhi	Literature and Education
2002	Madhu Mangesh Karnik	Maharashtra	Literature and Education
2002	Muzaffer Hussain	Maharashtra	Literature and Education
2002	Veettikat Kunduthodiyil Madhvan Kutty	Haryana	Literature and Education
2003	Bal Ram Nanda	Delhi	Literature and Education
2003	Sitakant Mahapatra	Odisha	Literature and Education
2003	Ottupulakkal Velukkuty Vijayan	Kerala	Literature and Education
2003	Prabhu Dayal Chawla	Delhi	Literature and Education
2003	Subhas Mukhopadhyay	West Bengal	Literature and Education
2003	Thaliyadiparambil Vittappa Ramachandra Shenoy	Delhi	Literature and Education
2003	Jagdish Chaturvedi	Delhi	Literature and Education
2003	Motilal Jotwani	Delhi	Literature and Education
2003	Pritam Singh	Uttar Pradesh	Literature and Education
2003	Yarlagadda Lakshmi Prasad	Andhra Pradesh	Literature and Education
2003	Jahnu Barua	Assam	Literature and Education
2003	Manzoor Ahtesham	Madhya Pradesh	Literature and Education
2003	Nokdenlemba	Nagaland	Literature and Education
2003	Pratapsinh Ganapatrao Jadhav	Maharashtra	Literature and Education
2003	Ramasamy Vairamuthu	Tamil Nadu	Literature and Education
2003	Shailendra Nath Shrivastava	Bihar	Literature and Education
2004	Amrita Pritam	Delhi	Literature and Education
2004	(Prof.) Chennamaneni Hanumantha Rao	Telangana	Literature and Education
2004	Krishna Srinivas	Tamil Nadu	Literature and Education
2004	Gopi Chand Narang	Delhi	Literature and Education
2004	Madhav Vittal Kamath	Maharashtra	Literature and Education
2004	Vishnu Prabhakar	Delhi	Literature and Education
2004	Kumarpal Desai	Gujarat	Literature and Education
2004	Ramesh Chandra Shah	Madhya Pradesh	Literature and Education
2004	Samuel Paul	Karnataka	Literature and Education
2004	Shyam Narain Panday	Uttar Pradesh	Literature and Education
2004	Syed Shah Mohammed Hussaini	Karnataka	Literature and Education
2004	Dr.(Smt.) Dalip Kaur Tiwana	Punjab	Literature and Education
2004	Dr.(Smt.) Tatyana Yakovlevna Elizarenkova	Russia	Literature and Education
2004	Premlata Puri	Delhi	Literature and Education
2004	(Smt.) Asifa Zamani	Uttar Pradesh	Literature and Education
2004	Anil Kumar Gupta	Gujarat	Literature and Education
2004	Hamlet Bareh Ngapkynta	Meghalaya	Literature and Education
2004	Kesava Paniker Ayyappa Paniker	Kerala	Literature and Education
2004	Prithvi Nath Kaula	Uttar Pradesh	Literature and Education
2004	Prof.(Dr.) Heinrich Freiherr Von Stietencron	Germany	Literature and Education
2004	Prof.(Smt.) Sunita Jain	Delhi	Literature and Education
2004	Aubakir Dastan-uly Nilibayev	Kazakhstan	Literature and Education
2004	Bal Gangadhar Samant	Maharashtra	Literature and Education
2004	Kanhaiyalal Sethia	West Bengal	Literature and Education
2004	Leeladhar Jagoodi	Uttarakhand	Literature and Education
2004	P. Parameswaran	Kerala	Literature and Education
2004	Sudhir Tailang	Delhi	Literature and Education
2004	Gowri Ishwaran	Delhi	Literature and Education
2005	Andre Beteille	Delhi	Literature and Education
2005	Mrinal Datta Chaudhuri	Delhi	Literature and Education
2005	Sardar 'Anjum'	Haryana	Literature and Education
2005	(Ms.) Qurratulain Hyder	Delhi	Literature and Education
2005	Irfan Habib	Uttar Pradesh	Literature and Education
2005	Mrinal Miri	Meghalaya	Literature and Education
2005	Balraj Puri	Jammu and Kashmir	Literature and Education
2005	Madath Thekepat Vasudevan Nair	Kerala	Literature and Education
2005	William Mark Tully	Delhi	Literature and Education
2005	Shantaram Balwant Mujumdar	Maharashtra	Literature and Education
2005	Mehrunnisa Parvez	Madhya Pradesh	Literature and Education
2005	Amiya Kumar Bagchi	West Bengal	Literature and Education
2005	Jagtar Singh Grewal	Chandigarh	Literature and Education
2005	Darchhawna	Mizoram	Literature and Education
2005	Amin Kamil	Jammu and Kashmir	Literature and Education
2005	Bilat Paswan Vihangam	Bihar	Literature and Education
2005	Gadul Singh Lama (Sanu Lama)	Sikkim	Literature and Education
2005	Mammen Mathew	Kerala	Literature and Education
2005	Manas Chaudhuri	Meghalaya	Literature and Education
2005	Shobhana Bhartia	Delhi	Literature and Education
2006	Mahasweta Devi	West Bengal	Literature and Education
2006	Dusan Zbavitel	Czech Republic	Literature and Education
2006	Dr.(Smt.) Dinesh Nandini Dalmia	Delhi	Literature and Education
2006	Gregory Bongard-Levin	Russia	Literature and Education
2006	Moolamattom Varkey Pylee	Kerala	Literature and Education
2006	Vijay Shankar Vyas	Rajasthan	Literature and Education
2006	Prof.(Dr.) Lokesh Chandra	Delhi	Literature and Education
2006	Kamleshwar	Haryana	Literature and Education
2006	Ramakanta Rath	Odisha	Literature and Education
2006	Miss Mahmuda Ahmad Ali Shah	Jammu and Kashmir	Literature and Education
2006	Sucheta Dalal	Maharashtra	Literature and Education
2006	Laltluangliana Khiangte	Mizoram	Literature and Education
2006	Sitanshu Yashaschandra	Gujarat	Literature and Education
2006	Prof.(Dr.) Lothar Lutze	Germany	Literature and Education
2006	Kashmiri Lal Zakir	Chandigarh	Literature and Education
2006	Ajeet Cour	Delhi	Literature and Education
2006	Fatma Rafiq Zakaria	Maharashtra	Literature and Education
2006	Mrinal Pande	Delhi	Literature and Education
2006	Sugathakumari	Kerala	Literature and Education
2007	Raja Rao (Posthumous)	United States of America	Literature and Education
2007	Khushwant Singh	Delhi	Literature and Education
2007	Capt. L.Z. Sailo	Mizoram	Literature and Education
2007	Gopaldas Neeraj	Uttar Pradesh	Literature and Education
2007	Father Gabriel Chiramel C.M.I.	Kerala	Literature and Education
2007	Chandra Prasad Saikia (Posthumous)	Assam	Literature and Education
2007	Bhikhu Parekh	United Kingdom	Literature and Education
2007	Jeffrey D. Sachs	United States of America	Literature and Education
2007	Tapan Kumar Raychaudhuri	United Kingdom	Literature and Education
2007	Thirukodikaval Nilakanta Srinivasan	United States of America	Literature and Education
2007	Javed Akhtar	Maharashtra	Literature and Education
2007	(Smt.) Pratibha Ray	Odisha	Literature and Education
2007	Bakul Harshadrai Dholakia	Gujarat	Literature and Education
2007	Giriraj Kishore	Uttar Pradesh	Literature and Education
2007	Mahadev Prasad Pandey	Chhattisgarh	Literature and Education
2007	Yusufkhan Mohamadkhan Pathan	Maharashtra	Literature and Education
2007	Dr.(Ms.) Meenakshi Gopinath	Delhi	Literature and Education
2007	Ravindra Dayal (Posthumous)	Delhi	Literature and Education
2007	Mira Salganik alias Mariam L'vovna Salganik	Russia	Literature and Education
2007	(Dr.) Adya Prasad Mishra	Uttar Pradesh	Literature and Education
2007	(Dr.) Shekhar Pathak	Uttarakhand	Literature and Education
2007	(Ms.) Temsula Ao	Assam	Literature and Education
2007	Mushirul Hasan	Delhi	Literature and Education
2007	Rybakov Rostislav	Russia	Literature and Education
2007	Amitav Ghosh	United States of America	Literature and Education
2007	Mujtaba Hussain	Telangana	Literature and Education
2007	T.S. Rangarajan alias Kavignar Vaalee	Tamil Nadu	Literature and Education
2007	Vijai Dan Detha	Rajasthan	Literature and Education
2007	Vikram Seth	United Kingdom	Literature and Education
2008	(Smt.) Shayama Chona	Delhi	Literature and Education
2008	(Smt.) Padma Desai	United States of America	Literature and Education
2008	Brijinder Nath Goswamy	Chandigarh	Literature and Education
2008	Ji Xianlin	China	Literature and Education
2008	Kaushik Basu	United States of America	Literature and Education
2008	Srinivasa Varadhan	United States of America	Literature and Education
2008	Prof.(Dr.) Tharaileth Koshy Oommen	Haryana	Literature and Education
2008	Ravindra Kelekar	Goa	Literature and Education
2008	Shrilal Shukla	Uttar Pradesh	Literature and Education
2008	B. Sivanthi Adityan	Tamil Nadu	Literature and Education
2008	Nirupam Bajpai	United States of America	Literature and Education
2008	Srinivas Udgata	Odisha	Literature and Education
2008	Vellayani Arjunan	Kerala	Literature and Education
2008	Mohammed Yusuf Taing	Jammu and Kashmir	Literature and Education
2008	Barkha Dutt	Delhi	Literature and Education
2008	Amitabh Mattoo	Jammu and Kashmir	Literature and Education
2008	Bholabhai Patel	Gujarat	Literature and Education
2008	Bina Agarwal	Delhi	Literature and Education
2008	(Smt.) M. Leelavathy	Kerala	Literature and Education
2008	K. S. Nissar Ahmed	Karnataka	Literature and Education
2008	Sukhadeo Kisanrao Thorat	Delhi	Literature and Education
2008	Rajdeep Sardesai	Delhi	Literature and Education
2008	Surjya Kanta Hazarika	Assam	Literature and Education
2008	Vinod Dua	Delhi	Literature and Education
2009	Debi Prasad Chattopadhyaya	West Bengal	Literature and Education
2009	Isher Judge Ahluwalia	Delhi	Literature and Education
2009	Ramachandra Guha	Karnataka	Literature and Education
2009	(Dr.) Minoru Hara	Japan	Literature and Education
2009	A. Sreedhara Menon	Kerala	Literature and Education
2009	C. K. Prahalad	United States of America	Literature and Education
2009	D. Jayakanthan	Tamil Nadu	Literature and Education
2009	Kunwar Narain	Delhi	Literature and Education
2009	Shekhar Gupta	Delhi	Literature and Education
2009	Aayu. Laxman Mane	Maharashtra	Literature and Education
2009	A. Sankara Reddy	Delhi	Literature and Education
2009	Alok Mehta	Delhi	Literature and Education
2009	John Ralston Marr	United Kingdom	Literature and Education
2009	Mathoor Krishnamurti	Karnataka	Literature and Education
2009	Panchapakesa Jayaraman	United States of America	Literature and Education
2009	Ravindra Nath Shrivastava alias Ravindra Rajhans	Bihar	Literature and Education
2009	Utpal K. Banerjee	Delhi	Literature and Education
2009	(Dr.) Ranbir Chander Sobti	Chandigarh	Literature and Education
2009	Birendranath Datta	Assam	Literature and Education
2009	Geshe Ngawang Samten	Uttar Pradesh	Literature and Education
2009	Jalees Ahmed Khan Tareen	Puducherry	Literature and Education
2009	Ram Shankar Tripathi	Uttar Pradesh	Literature and Education
2009	Abhay Chhajlani	Madhya Pradesh	Literature and Education
2009	Bannanje Govindacharya	Karnataka	Literature and Education
2009	Jayanta Mahapatra	Odisha	Literature and Education
2009	Lalthangfala Sailo	Mizoram	Literature and Education
2009	Norden Tshering Bhutia	Sikkim	Literature and Education
2009	Shamsur Rahman Faruqi	Uttar Pradesh	Literature and Education
2009	Sunny Varkey	UAE	Literature and Education
2009	Suresh Gundu Amonkar	Goa	Literature and Education
2009	Shashi Deshpande	Karnataka	Literature and Education

== 2010–2019 ==
Year	Name	State	Field
2010	Fareed Rafiq Zakaria	United States of America	Literature and Education
2010	Bipan Chandra	Delhi	Literature and Education
2010	Mohammad Amin	Delhi	Literature and Education
2010	Satya Vrat Shastri	Delhi	Literature and Education
2010	Tan Chung	United States of America	Literature and Education
2010	Anil Bordia	Rajasthan	Literature and Education
2010	Gian Parkash Chopra	Delhi	Literature and Education
2010	Jitendra Udhampuri	Jammu and Kashmir	Literature and Education
2010	Lal Bahadur Singh Chauhan	Uttar Pradesh	Literature and Education
2010	Maria Aurora Couto	Goa	Literature and Education
2010	Ranganathan Parthasarathy (Indira Parthasarathy)	Tamil Nadu	Literature and Education
2010	Surendra Dubey	Chhattisgarh	Literature and Education
2010	Dr.(Smt.) Y.G. Rajalakshmi Parthasarathy	Tamil Nadu	Literature and Education
2010	Fr. Romuald D’Souza	Goa	Literature and Education
2010	Bertha Gyndykes Dkhar	Meghalaya	Literature and Education
2010	Arvind Kumar	Maharashtra	Literature and Education
2010	Govind Chandra Pande	Madhya Pradesh	Literature and Education
2010	Hamidi Kashmiri	Jammu and Kashmir	Literature and Education
2010	Hermann Kulke	Germany	Literature and Education
2010	Ramaranjan Mukherji (Posthmous)	West Bengal	Literature and Education
2010	Sadiq-ur-Rahman Kidwai	Delhi	Literature and Education
2010	Sheldon Pollock	United States of America	Literature and Education
2010	Arun Sarma	Assam	Literature and Education
2010	Lalzuia Colney	Mizoram	Literature and Education
2011	Sitakant Mahapatra	Odisha	Literature and Education
2011	O. N. V. Kurup	Kerala	Literature and Education
2011	Ramdas Madhav Pai	Karnataka	Literature and Education
2011	Sankha Ghosh	West Bengal	Literature and Education
2011	T. J. S. George	Karnataka	Literature and Education
2011	Avvai Natarajan	Tamil Nadu	Literature and Education
2011	Chandra Prakash Deval	Rajasthan	Literature and Education
2011	Pravin Darji	Gujarat	Literature and Education
2011	Mamang Dai	Arunachal Pradesh	Literature and Education
2011	Urvashi Butalia and Smt. Ritu Menon (Duo)	Delhi	Literature and Education
2011	D. D. Sharma	Uttarakhand	Literature and Education
2011	Karl Harrington Potter	United States of America	Literature and Education
2011	Koneru Ramakrishna Rao	Andhra Pradesh	Literature and Education
2011	Krishna Kumar	Delhi	Literature and Education
2011	Nilamber Dev Sharma	Jammu and Kashmir	Literature and Education
2011	Pullella Sri Rama Chandrudu	Telangana	Literature and Education
2011	Riyaz Punjabi	Jammu and Kashmir	Literature and Education
2011	Prof.(Dr) Bhalchandra Vana Nemade	Himachal Pradesh	Literature and Education
2011	Prof.(Dr) Devi Prasad Dwivedi	Uttar Pradesh	Literature and Education
2011	Balraj Komal	Delhi	Literature and Education
2011	Barun Mazumder	West Bengal	Literature and Education
2011	Devanur Mahadeva	Karnataka	Literature and Education
2011	Granville Austin	United Kingdom	Literature and Education
2011	Mahim Bora	Assam	Literature and Education
2011	Buangi Sailo	Mizoram	Literature and Education
2011	Rajni Kumar	Delhi	Literature and Education
2012	Jose Pereira	United Kingdom	Literature and Education
2012	Arvind Panagariya	United States of America	Literature and Education
2012	Homi K. Bhabha	United States of America	Literature and Education
2012	Vidya Dehejia	United States of America	Literature and Education
2012	Prof.(Dr.) Shantaram Balwant Mujumdar	Maharashtra	Literature and Education
2012	Eberhard Fischer	Switzerland	Literature and Education
2012	Surjit Singh Patar	Punjab	Literature and Education
2012	Pepita Seth	Kerala	Literature and Education
2012	Ralte L. Thanmawia	Mizoram	Literature and Education
2012	Sachchidanand Sahai	Bihar	Literature and Education
2012	Irwin Allan Sealy	Uttarakhand	Literature and Education
2012	Kedar Gurung	Sikkim	Literature and Education
2012	Vijay Dutt Shridhar	Madhya Pradesh	Literature and Education
2012	Geeta Dharmarajan	Delhi	Literature and Education
2013	Gayatri Chakravorty Spivak	United States of America	Literature and Education
2013	Mangesh Padgaonkar	Maharashtra	Literature and Education
2013	Jagdish Prasad Singh	Bihar	Literature and Education
2013	Radhika Herzberger	Andhra Pradesh	Literature and Education
2013	Rama Kant Shukla	Delhi	Literature and Education
2013	(Capt.) Dr. Mohammad Sharfe Alam	Bihar	Literature and Education
2013	Akhtarul Wasey	Delhi	Literature and Education
2013	Anvita Abbi	Delhi	Literature and Education
2013	Christopher Pinney	United Kingdom	Literature and Education
2013	Noboru Karashima	Japan	Literature and Education
2013	Devendra Patel	Gujarat	Literature and Education
2013	J. Malsawma	Mizoram	Literature and Education
2013	Nida Fazli	Maharashtra	Literature and Education
2013	Salik Lakhnawi (Posthumous)	West Bengal	Literature and Education
2013	Surender Sharma	Delhi	Literature and Education
2014	Dhirubhai Premshanker Thaker (Posthumous)	Gujarat	Literature and Education
2014	Mrityunjay B. Athreya	Delhi	Literature and Education
2014	Anita Desai	United States of America	Literature and Education
2014	Lloyd I. Rudolph (Duo)	United States of America	Literature and Education
2014	Anisuzzaman	Bangladesh	Literature and Education
2014	Susanne H. Rudolph (Duo)	United States of America	Literature and Education
2014	Vairamuthu	Tamil Nadu	Literature and Education
2014	Ruskin Bond	Uttarakhand	Literature and Education
2014	(Mrs.) P. Kilemsungla	Nagaland	Literature and Education
2014	Naheed Abidi	Uttar Pradesh	Literature and Education
2014	(Dr.) Sengaku Mayeda	Japan	Literature and Education
2014	Ashok Chakradhar	Delhi	Literature and Education
2014	Dinesh Singh	Delhi	Literature and Education
2014	G. N. Devy	Gujarat	Literature and Education
2014	Kolakaluri Enoch	Telangana	Literature and Education
2014	Rehana Khatoon	Delhi	Literature and Education
2014	Ved Kumari Ghai	Jammu and Kashmir	Literature and Education
2014	Vishnu Narayanan Namboodiri	Kerala	Literature and Education
2014	Chhakchhuak Chhuanvawra	Mizoram	Literature and Education
2014	Keki N. Daruwalla	Delhi	Literature and Education
2014	Waikhom Gojen Meetei	Manipur	Literature and Education
2014	Manorama Jafa	Delhi	Literature and Education
2015	Jagadguru Swami Rambhadracharya	Uttar Pradesh	Literature and Education
2015	David Frawley	United States of America	Literature and Education
2015	Rajat Sharma	Delhi	Literature and Education
2015	Swapan Dasgupta	Delhi	Literature and Education
2015	Bettina Sharada Baumer	Himachal Pradesh	Literature and Education
2015	Gyan Chaturvedi	Madhya Pradesh	Literature and Education
2015	Sunil Jogi	Delhi	Literature and Education
2015	Dr.(Mrs.) Annette Schmiedchen	Germany	Literature and Education
2015	Ashok Gulati	Delhi	Literature and Education
2015	Bimal Kumar Roy	West Bengal	Literature and Education
2015	Gunvant Shah	Gujarat	Literature and Education
2015	Huang Baosheng	China	Literature and Education
2015	Jagmohan Singh Rajput	Uttar Pradesh	Literature and Education
2015	Nadarajan Raj Chetty	United States of America	Literature and Education
2015	Prof.(Dr.) Lakshmi Nandan Bora	Assam	Literature and Education
2015	Bibek Debroy	Delhi	Literature and Education
2015	Brahmdev Sharma 'Bhaiji'	Delhi	Literature and Education
2015	George L. Hart	United States of America	Literature and Education
2015	Jean-Claude Carriere	France	Literature and Education
2015	Lambert Mascarenhas	Goa	Literature and Education
2015	Manu Sharma	Uttar Pradesh	Literature and Education
2015	N. Purushothama Mallaya	Kerala	Literature and Education
2015	Rambahadur Rai	Uttar Pradesh	Literature and Education
2015	Tarak Janubhai Mehta	Gujarat	Literature and Education
2015	Ushakiran Khan	Bihar	Literature and Education
2016	Avinash Kamlakar Dixit	United States of America	Literature and Education
2016	Ramoji Rao	Telangana	Literature and Education
2016	Barjinder Singh Hamdard	Punjab	Literature and Education
2016	Yarlagadda Lakshmi Prasad	Andhra Pradesh	Literature and Education
2016	N. S. Ramanuja Tatacharya	Maharashtra	Literature and Education
2016	Kameswar Brahma	Assam	Literature and Education
2016	Ravindra Nagar	Delhi	Literature and Education
2016	S. L. Bhyrappa	Karnataka	Literature and Education
2016	Shree Dahyabhai Karunashankar Shastri	Gujarat	Literature and Education
2016	Pushpesh Pant	Haryana	Literature and Education
2016	Ashok Malik	Delhi	Literature and Education
2016	Dhirendra Nath Bezboruah	Assam	Literature and Education
2016	Haladhar Nag	Odisha	Literature and Education
2016	Jawahar Lal Kaul	Delhi	Literature and Education
2016	Prahlad Chandra Tasa	Assam	Literature and Education
2016	Salman Khan	United States of America	Literature and Education
2017	Her Royal Highness Princess Maha Chakri Sirindhorn	Thailand	Literature and Education
2017	(Dr.) Devi Prasad Dwivedi	Uttar Pradesh	Literature and Education
2017	Cho Ramaswamy (Posthumous)	Tamil Nadu	Literature and Education
2017	Narendra Kohli	Delhi	Literature and Education
2017	G. Venkatasubbiah	Karnataka	Literature and Education
2017	Balbir Dutt	Jharkhand	Literature and Education
2017	Hasmukh(H.R.)Shah	United States of America	Literature and Education
2017	Michel Danino	Tamil Nadu	Literature and Education
2017	Punam Suri	Delhi	Literature and Education
2017	Viharidas Gopaldas Patel	Gujarat	Literature and Education
2017	Akkitham Achuthan Namboothiri	Kerala	Literature and Education
2017	Anant Agarwal	United States of America	Literature and Education
2017	Birkha Bahadur Subba Muringla	Sikkim	Literature and Education
2017	Chamu Krishna Shastry	Delhi	Literature and Education
2017	Harihar Kripalu Tripathi	Uttar Pradesh	Literature and Education
2017	Kashinath Pandit	Jammu and Kashmir	Literature and Education
2017	Vishnu Pandya	Gujarat	Literature and Education
2017	Bhawana Somaaya	Maharashtra	Literature and Education
2017	Eli Ahmed	Assam	Literature and Education
2017	Dr.(Smt.) Vege Koteswaramma	Andhra Pradesh	Literature and Education
2018	P. Parameswaran	Kerala	Literature and Education
2018	Ved Prakash Nanda	United States of America	Literature and Education
2018	Prafulla Govinda Baruah	Assam	Literature and Education
2018	Pandit Shyamlal Chaturvedi	Chhattisgarh	Literature and Education
2018	Arup Kumar Dutta	Assam	Literature and Education
2018	Arvind Kumar Gupta	Maharashtra	Literature and Education
2018	Digamber Hansda	Jharkhand	Literature and Education
2018	M. Piyongtemjen Jamir	Nagaland	Literature and Education
2018	Malti Joshi	Madhya Pradesh	Literature and Education
2018	Dr.(Ms.) Joyshree Goswami Mahanta	Assam	Literature and Education
2018	Zaverilal Dalpatram Mehta	Gujarat	Literature and Education
2018	Krishna Bihari Mishra	West Bengal	Literature and Education
2018	Keshavrao Sadashivshastri Musalgaonkar	Madhya Pradesh	Literature and Education
2018	Chandrasekhar Rath (Posthumous)	Odisha	Literature and Education
2018	Bhagirath Prasad Tripathi ‘Vagish Shastri’	Uttar Pradesh	Literature and Education
2018	Maharao Raghuveer Singh, Sirohi	Rajasthan	Literature and Education
2018	Gangadhar Vithobaji Pantawane	Maharashtra	Literature and Education
2018	A Zakia	Mizoram	Literature and Education
2018	Anwar Ahmad alias Anwar Jalalpuri (Posthumous)	Uttar Pradesh	Literature and Education
2018	Tomio Mizokami	Japan	Literature and Education
2018	Habibullo Rajabov	Tajikistan	Literature and Education
2019	Kuldip Nayar (Posthumous)	Delhi	Literature and Education
2019	Narsingh Dev Jamwal	Jammu and Kashmir	Literature and Education
2019	Kailash Madbaiya	Madhya Pradesh	Literature and Education
2019	Ganpat I. Patel	United States of America	Literature and Education
2019	Nagindas Sanghavi	Gujarat	Literature and Education
2019	Mohammad Hanif Khan Shastri	Delhi	Literature and Education
2019	Brijesh Kumar Shukla	Uttar Pradesh	Literature and Education
2019	Devendra Swarup (Posthumous)	Uttar Pradesh	Literature and Education

== 2020–2025 ==
Year	Name	State	Field
2020	Manoj Das (Posthumous)	Puducherry	Literature and Education
2020	Jagdish N. Sheth	United States of America	Literature and Education
2020	Kazi Masum Akhtar	West Bengal	Literature and Education
2020	Gloria Arieira	Brazil	Literature and Education
2020	Damayanti Beshra	Odisha	Literature and Education
2020	Lil Bahadur Chettri	Assam	Literature and Education
2020	Indra Dassanayake (Posthumous)	Sri Lanka	Literature and Education
2020	H. M. Desai	Gujarat	Literature and Education
2020	Meenakshi Jain	Delhi	Literature and Education
2020	Beni Chandra Jamatia (Posthumous)	Tripura	Literature and Education
2020	Vidushi K.S. Jayalakshmi and Shri K. V. Sampathkumar (Posthumous) (Duo)	Karnataka	Literature and Education
2020	C. Kamlova	Mizoram	Literature and Education
2020	Narayan J. Joshi 'Karayal'	Gujarat	Literature and Education
2020	Sriprakash Kotharii	United States of America	Literature and Education
2020	Rajendra Mishra	Himachal Pradesh	Literature and Education
2020	Binapani Mohanty	Odisha	Literature and Education
2020	Prithwindra Mukherjee	France	Literature and Education
2020	N. Chandrasekharan Nair	Kerala	Literature and Education
2020	Shiv Datt 'Nirmohi'	Jammu and Kashmir	Literature and Education
2020	Lalbiakthanga Pachuau	Mizoram	Literature and Education
2020	Prasanta Kumar Pattanaik	United States of America	Literature and Education
2020	Jogendra Nath Phukan	Assam	Literature and Education
2020	Yogesh Praveen (Posthumous)	Uttar Pradesh	Literature and Education
2020	Shahbuddin Rathod	Gujarat	Literature and Education
2020	Sribhashyam Vijayasarathi	Telangana	Literature and Education
2020	Yeshe Dorjee Thongchi	Arunachal Pradesh	Literature and Education
2020	Robert A.F. Thurman	United States of America	Literature and Education
2021	Chandrashekhara Kambara	Karnataka	Literature and Education
2021	Asavadi Prakasa Rao	Andhra Pradesh	Literature and Education
2021	Dharma Narayan Barma	West Bengal	Literature and Education
2021	Sujit Chatterjee	West Bengal	Literature and Education
2021	Srikant Madav Datar	United States of America	Literature and Education
2021	Dadudan Gadhavi (Kavi “Daad”) (Posthumous)	Gujarat	Literature and Education
2021	Jaibhagwan Goyal	Haryana	Literature and Education
2021	Jagadish Chandra Halder	West Bengal	Literature and Education
2021	(Prof.) Mangalsingh Hazowary	Assam	Literature and Education
2021	Namdeo Chandrabhan Kamble	Maharashtra	Literature and Education
2021	Rajat Kumar Kar	Odisha	Literature and Education
2021	R. L. Kashyap	Karnataka	Literature and Education
2021	Nicholas Kazanas	Greece	Literature and Education
2021	Chandrakant Mehta	Gujarat	Literature and Education
2021	Sundaram Solomon Pappiah	Tamil Nadu	Literature and Education
2021	Nanda Prusty	Odisha	Literature and Education
2021	Balan Putheri	Kerala	Literature and Education
2021	Chaman Lal Sapru (Posthumous)	Jammu and Kashmir	Literature and Education
2021	Roman Sarmah	Assam	Literature and Education
2021	Imran Shah	Assam	Literature and Education
2021	Arjun Singh Shekhawat	Rajasthan	Literature and Education
2021	Ram Yatna Shukla	Uttar Pradesh	Literature and Education
2021	Mridula Sinha (Posthumous)	Bihar	Literature and Education
2021	Kapil Tiwari	Madhya Pradesh	Literature and Education
2021	Father Carlos G. Vallés (Posthumous)	Spain	Literature and Education
2021	Usha Yadav	Uttar Pradesh	Literature and Education
2022	Radheyshyam Khemka (Posthumous)	Uttar Pradesh	Literature and Education
2022	Pratibha Ray	Odisha	Literature and Education
2022	Sachchidanand Swami	Gujarat	Literature and Education
2022	Acharya Vashishth Tripathi	Uttar Pradesh	Literature and Education
2022	Najma Akhtar	Delhi	Literature and Education
2022	T. Senka Ao	Nagaland	Literature and Education
2022	Jatinder Kumar Bajaj	Delhi	Literature and Education
2022	Sirpi Balasubramaniam	Tamil Nadu	Literature and Education
2022	Akhone Asgar Ali "Basharat"	Ladakh	Literature and Education
2022	(Prof.) Harmohinder Singh Bedi	Punjab	Literature and Education
2022	(Dr.) Maria Krzysztof Byrski	Poland	Literature and Education
2022	Khalil Dhantejvi (Posthumous)	Gujarat	Literature and Education
2022	Dhaneswar Engti	Assam	Literature and Education
2022	Garikapati V.B. Narasimha Rao	Telangana	Literature and Education
2022	Giridhari Ram Gaunjhu "Giriraj" (Posthumous)	Jharkhand	Literature and Education
2022	Shaibal Gupta (Posthumous)	Bihar	Literature and Education
2022	Narasingha Prasad Guru	Odisha	Literature and Education
2022	Awadh Kishore Jadia	Madhya Pradesh	Literature and Education
2022	Tara Jauhar	Delhi	Literature and Education
2022	Rutger Kortenhorst	Ireland	Literature and Education
2022	P. Narayana Kurup	Kerala	Literature and Education
2022	V. L. Naghaka	Mizoram	Literature and Education
2022	Chirapat Prapandavidya	Thailand	Literature and Education
2022	Vidyanand Saraik	Himachal Pradesh	Literature and Education
2022	Kali Pada Saren	West Bengal	Literature and Education
2022	Dilip T. Shahani	Delhi	Literature and Education
2022	Vishwa Murti Shastri	Jammu and Kashmir	Literature and Education
2022	Tatiana Shaumyan	Russia	Literature and Education
2022	Siddalingaiah (Posthumous)	Karnataka	Literature and Education
2022	Vidya Vindu Singh	Uttar Pradesh	Literature and Education
2022	Raghuvendra Tanwar	Haryana	Literature and Education
2022	(Ms.) Badaplin War	Meghalaya	Literature and Education
2023	S. L. Bhyrappa	Karnataka	Literature and Education
2023	Kapil Kapoor	Delhi	Literature and Education
2023	Radhacharan Gupta	Uttar Pradesh	Literature and Education
2023	C I Issac	Kerala	Literature and Education
2023	Rattan Singh Jaggi	Punjab	Literature and Education
2023	Anand Kumar	Bihar	Literature and Education
2023	Prabhakar Bhanudas Mande	Maharashtra	Literature and Education
2023	Antaryami Mishra	Odisha	Literature and Education
2023	Ramesh Raghunath Patange	Maharashtra	Literature and Education
2023	Bandi Ramakrishna Reddy	Telangana	Literature and Education
2023	Mohan Singh	Jammu and Kashmir	Literature and Education
2023	Prakash Chandra Sood	Andhra Pradesh	Literature and Education
2023	Janum Singh Soy	Jharkhand	Literature and Education
2023	Vishwanath Prasad Tiwari	Uttar Pradesh	Literature and Education
2023	Dhaniram Toto	West Bengal	Literature and Education
2024	Hormusji N. Cama	Maharashtra	Literature and Education
2024	Kundan Vyas	Maharashtra	Literature and Education
2024	Raghuveer Chaudhari	Gujarat	Literature and Education
2024	R. N. Joe D’ Cruz	Tamil Nadu	Literature and Education
2024	Pierre-Sylvain Filliozat	France	Literature and Education
2024	(Dr.) Rajaram Jain	Uttar Pradesh	Literature and Education
2024	Yashwant Singh Kathoch	Uttarakhand	Literature and Education
2024	Zahir Ishaq Kazi	Maharashtra	Literature and Education
2024	Surendra Kishore	Bihar	Literature and Education
2024	Sridhar Makam Krishnamurthy	Karnataka	Literature and Education
2024	Pakaravoor Chithran Namboodiripad (Posthumous)	Kerala	Literature and Education
2024	Harish Naik (Posthumous)	Gujarat	Literature and Education
2024	Fred NEGRIT	France	Literature and Education
2024	Swami Muni Narayana Prasad	Kerala	Literature and Education
2024	Bhagwatilal Rajpurohit	Madhya Pradesh	Literature and Education
2024	Navjivan Rastogi	Uttar Pradesh	Literature and Education
2024	Kethavath Somlal	Telangana	Literature and Education
2024	Gouri Lakshmi Bayi Thampuratty	Kerala	Literature and Education
2024	Kurella Vithalacharya	Telangana	Literature and Education
2025	M. T. Vasudevan Nair (Posthumous)	Kerala	Literature and Education
2025	A. Surya Prakash	Karnataka	Literature and Education
2025	Bibek Debroy (Posthumous)	Delhi	Literature and Education
2025	Rambahadur Rai	Uttar Pradesh	Literature and Education
2025	Anil Kumar Boro	Assam	Literature and Education
2025	Arunoday Saha	Tripura	Literature and Education
2025	Arvind Sharma	Canada	Literature and Education
2025	Chandrakant Sheth (Posthumous)	Gujarat	Literature and Education
2025	David R Syiemlieh	Meghalaya	Literature and Education
2025	Ganeshwar Shastri Dravid	Uttar Pradesh	Literature and Education
2025	Gita Upadhyay	Assam	Literature and Education
2025	Hriday Narayan Dixit	Uttar Pradesh	Literature and Education
2025	Hugh and Colleen Gantzer (Posthumous) (Duo)*	Uttarakhand	Literature and Education
2025	Jagadish Joshila	Madhya Pradesh	Literature and Education
2025	K L Krishna	Andhra Pradesh	Literature and Education
2025	Lakshmipathy Ramasubbaiyer	Tamil Nadu	Literature and Education
2025	Lalit Kumar Mangotra	Jammu and Kashmir	Literature and Education
2025	Maruti Bhujangrao Chitampalli	Maharashtra	Literature and Education
2025	Nagendra Nath Roy	West Bengal	Literature and Education
2025	Nitin Nohria	United States of America	Literature and Education
2025	Pratibha Satpathy	Odisha	Literature and Education
2025	Ramdarash Mishra	Delhi	Literature and Education
2025	Renthlei Lalrawna	Mizoram	Literature and Education
2025	Sant Ram Deswal	Haryana	Literature and Education
2025	Seeni Viswanathan	Tamil Nadu	Literature and Education
2025	Sheen Kaaf Nizam (Shiv Kishan Bissa)	Rajasthan	Literature and Education
2025	Stephen Knapp	United States of America	Literature and Education
2025	Syed Ainul Hasan	Uttar Pradesh	Literature and Education
2025	Tushar Durgeshbhai Shukla	Gujarat	Literature and Education
2025	Vadiraj Raghawendracharya Panchamukhi	Andhra Pradesh	Literature and Education
