= Ravindra Kumar =

Ravindra Kumar may refer to:

- Ravindra Kumar (political scientist) (born 1959), Indian academic
- G. Ravindra Kumar (born 1961), Indian laser physicist
