= League of Socialist Workers =

- Founded: 1949
- Dissolved: August 1954; 71 years ago
- ECI Status: State Party

The League of Socialist Workers was a political party in Hyderabad State. The party was founded in 1949, as a radical grouping led by Govindbhai Shroff and Babasaheb Paranjpe broke away from the Hyderabad State Congress. The League of Socialist Workers had a Marxist orientation and began to cooperate with the Communist Party of India and the Peasants and Workers Party of India.

The party was one of five constituents of the People's Democratic Front (PDF). The LSW had been registered with the Election Commission of India as a state party in Hyderabad State, being allotted the 'cock' as its election symbol. After the PDF was registered as a political party, the election symbols of LSW and other PDF constituents were declared free in Hyderabad State. LSW leader Babasaheb Paranjape was elected to the First Lok Sabha from the Bhir constituency in the 1952 election.

The relations between CPI and LSW inside the PDF were difficult, and the LSW eventually withdrew from the front. The LSW would become a marginal political force. The party was dissolved at a meeting of its executive held in Nanded in early August 1954.
