= Yogesh Praveen =

Indian writer (1938–2021)

- Born: December 28, 1938
- Died: April 12, 2021 (aged 82)
- Education: Meerut University
- Occupations: Author, scholar on history and culture of Avadh
- Awards: Padma Shri (2020)

Dr. Yogesh Praveen (28 October 1938 – 12 April 2021) was an Indian author and expert on the history and culture of Avadh, specifically Lucknow. He had a Masters in Hindi and Sanskrit in addition to a doctorate in Literature from Meerut University.

He was the recipient of India's highly prestigious award Padma Shri 2020 for his work in the field of literature and education.

== Books ==
- Dastane Avadh
- Tajdare Avadh
- Bahare Avadh
- Gulistane Avadh
- Doobta Avadh
- Dastane Luknow
- Aapka Lucknow
- Lucknow monuments
- Bire Basuri
- peele gulaab
- Sanamkhana
- sumanhaar
- mayur pankh
- Apraajita
- laxmanpur ki aatmkatha
- kanchanmrig
- Indradhanush
- shabnam
- ankvilaas
- Lucknow Sadiyo Ka Safer

== Other works ==
Apart from books he also published poetry. He had received a National Award for his book Lucknow Nama.

In 1998, he was given the UP Sangeet Natak Academy Award. In 1999, he was given the National Teachers Award. In 2000, he was given the UP Ranta Award. Hew as given the Yash Bharti Award in 2006. In 2020, he was given the Padma Shri. By 2021, he had written over two dozen books.

He also wrote lyrics for the film Junoon; he was also known as encyclopedia of Lucknow. Besides being the lyricist in the movie Junoon, his co-operation was taken in both films by the name of Umraao Jaan in (1982) and (2007).

He died in Lucknow on 12 April 2021. In Oct. 2021, Deputy chief minister Dinesh Sharma inaugurated the Yogesh Praveen intersection in Lucknow, named in honor of Praveen.

== See also ==
- List of people from Lucknow
- List of Padma Shri award recipients in literature and education
- List of Padma Shri award recipients (2020–2029)
