= Lalit Kumar Mangotra =

Indian educator and writer

- Born: 14 April 1944 (age 82)
- Education: University of Jammu and Kashmir, University of Jammu
- Occupations: Writer, Physicist, Professor
- Known for: President of Dogri Sanstha, Dogri literature
- Title: Professor
- Awards: Sahitya Akademi Award, Padma Shri

Lalit Kumar Mangotra, born on 14 April 1944, is an Indian Dogri-language writer and a former professor of physics. He has published works in diverse literary genres, including short stories, plays, poetry, essays, and literary criticism. In 2025, the Government of India awarded him the Padma Shri for his contributions to literature and education.

== Early life and academic career ==
Mangotra received a Master of Science degree in physics from the University of Jammu and Kashmir in 1968. He later completed a Doctor of Philosophy degree in High Energy Physics from the University of Jammu in 1974. He worked as a professor of physics at the University of Jammu until his retirement in 2004. During his academic career, he authored over 300 scientific publications.

== Literary career ==
Mangotra published his first Dogri short story in 1976. He has authored thirteen books spanning fiction, poetry, essays, and literary criticism. Several of his publications are included in the postgraduate syllabus for Dogri literature. Mangotra has served as the chairperson of the Dogri Sanstha, a literary organization in Jammu and Kashmir, for thirty years. In this role, he contributed to the technological integration of the Dogri language. His efforts included localizing eleven computer software tools into Dogri, creating an online Dogri-English dictionary, and adapting a computer concepts course for Dogri speakers.

== Awards and administration ==
Mangotra received the Sahitya Akademi Award in 2011 and the Jammu and Kashmir State Award for Outstanding Contribution to Dogri Literature in 2009. The Jammu and Kashmir Academy of Art, Culture and Languages awarded him Best Book Awards in 2000 and 2010. He also received a Senior Fellowship in Literature from the Ministry of Tourism and Culture and the Kunwar Viyogi Lifetime Achievement Award in 2024.

He has held administrative positions on several national and regional boards. He served two terms as a member of the Press Council of India. He was a member of the executive board of the Sahitya Akademi from 2003 to 2007 and again from 2013 to 2017. He also served as the Chairman of the Governing Board of the Government College for Women Parade Ground in Jammu, a member of the Council for Promotion of Indian Languages under the Ministry of Human Resource Development, and the Chairman of the North Zone Selection Committee for the Saraswati Samman. He has also been a part of official Indian writers' delegations to China and Japan.
