= Avadh Kishore Jadia =

Indian poet and writer

Avadh Kishore Jadia (or, Awadh Kishor Jadia) (born on 17 August 1948) is a poet and author in the Bundeli language and the Braj language from the Chhatarpur district in the Indian State of Madhya Pradesh. He was also an Ayurveda medical practitioner in the Madhya Pradesh Govt Service. In the year 2022, Govt of India honored him by conferring the Padma Shri award for his contributions as an author in the Bundeli and Braj languages.

== Early life ==
Avadh Kishore Jadia was born on 17 August 1948 in the Chhatarpur district in the present day Indian State of Madhya Pradesh. His father Brijlal Jadia was the royal physician in the princely state of Alipura, which was in the present day Chhatarpur district in the Indian state of Madhya Pradesh. Brajlal was also interested in literature and also was an astrologer. Avadh Kishore Jadia secured the Bachelor of Ayurveda, Medicine and Surgery (BAMS) degree in 1970 from Gwalior Jiwaji University and joined the Madhya Pradesh Govt Service as an Ayurveda physician and retired from government service in 2009.

== Recognition: Padma Shri ==
- In the year 2022, Govt of India conferred the Padma Shri award, the third highest award in the Padma series of awards, on Avadh Kishore Jadia for his distinguished service in the field of literature and education. The award is in recognition of his service as a "Respected Bundeli and Braj author from Chhatarpur credited with several books and poetry collections".

== Other recognitions and awards ==
The awards and recognitions conferred on Avadh Kishore Jadia include:

- "Sahitya Alankar" by Kala Sanskriti Sahitya Vidyapeeth, Mathura
- "Udyman Manas Mani" from Shri Ram Ramayana Sanskriti Trust Gwalior
- "Bundeli Gaurav" from All India Brij Sahitya Faculty Agra
- "Kavi Shiromani" from All India Brij Sahitya Sangam Mathura
- "Kavyaratna" from Sahityanand Parishad Gola Gokarnath
- Raja Santosh Singh Bundela Award
- "Lok Bhushan Samman", Uttar Pradesh (2012)

== Books ==
Poetry collections:

- Vandaniy Bundelkhand
- Uddhav Shatak
- Kare Kanhai Ke Kan Lagi Hai
- Biragmala

== See also ==
- Padma Shri Award recipients in the year 2022
