= Lakshmipathy Ramasubbaiyer =

Indian journalist and activist (b. 1935)

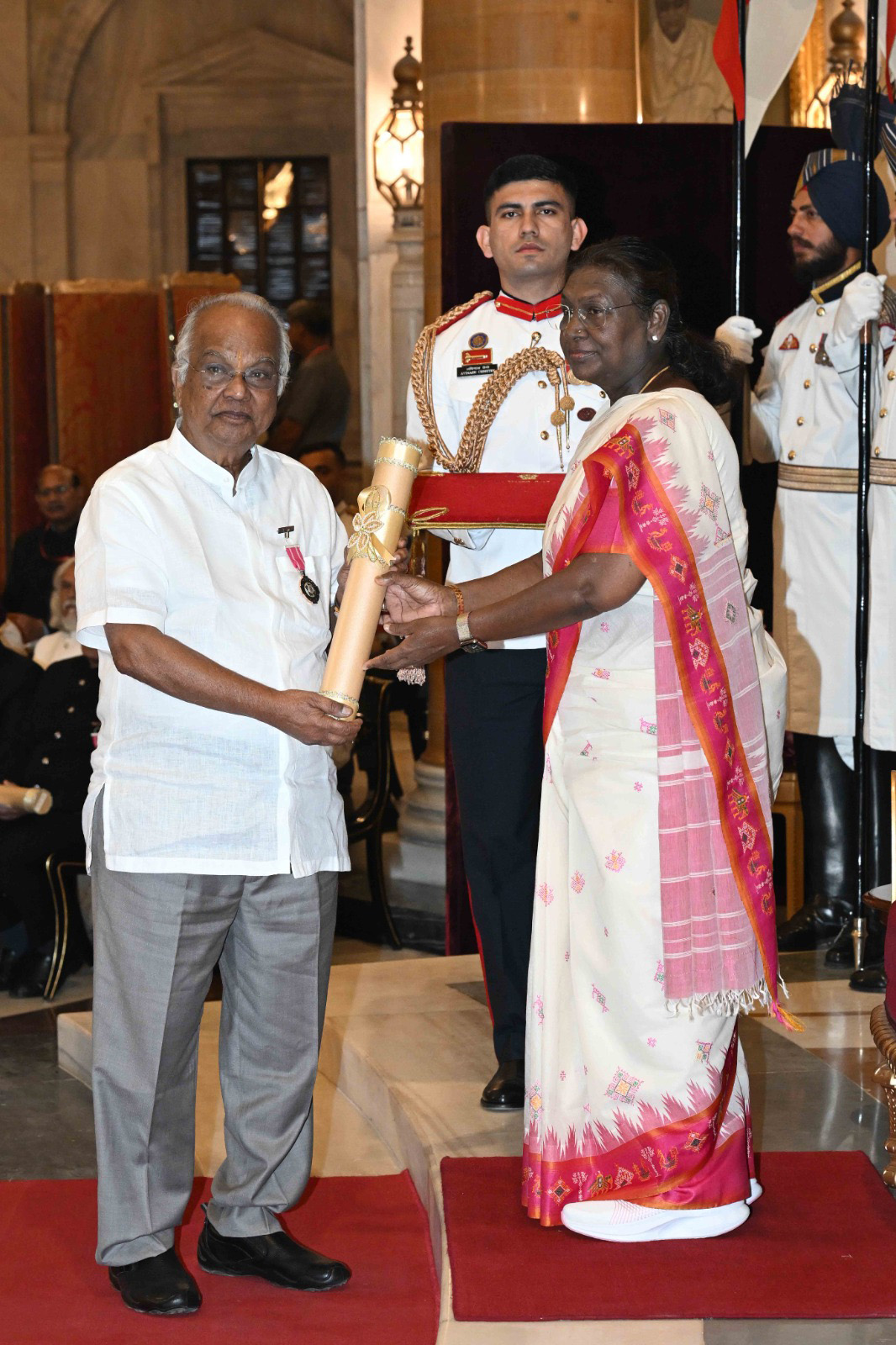
- Ramasubbaiyer (left) receiving the Padma Shri in 2025
- Born: 17 June 1935 (age 91)
- Education: Travancore University (BSc); University of Cardiff (Diploma)
- Occupations: Journalist, Educational Administrator
- Known for: Joint Managing Editor of Dinamalar, Founder of Subbalakshmi Lakshmipathy Foundation
- Awards: Padma Shri (2025)

Lakshmipathy Ramasubbaiyer (born 17 June 1935), also known as R. Lakshmipathy, is an Indian journalist, publisher, and educational administrator. He served as the Joint Managing Editor of the Tamil daily newspaper Dinamalar. He is the founder and President of the Subbalakshmi Lakshmipathy Foundation, an educational trust based in Madurai.

== Early life and education ==
Lakshmipathy Ramasubbaiyer was born on June 17, 1935. He completed his higher education at Travancore University, receiving a Bachelor of Science degree in chemistry. He subsequently earned a Diploma in Newspaper Management from the Thompson Foundation in the United Kingdom. In 1970, the Thompson Foundation deputed him to complete an additional Diploma in Newspaper Management at the University of Cardiff in South Wales.

== Career ==
Ramasubbaiyer began his career in the newspaper industry in 1956 as an Advertisement Executive at Dinamalar. He eventually became the publication's Joint Managing Editor, overseeing the integration of new printing and publishing technologies into the newspaper's operations. He has held several administrative positions within the Indian media sector. He served as the Chairman of the Audit Bureau of Circulation from 1986 to 1987 and as the President of the Indian Newspaper Society from 1992 to 1993. He was elected Chairman of the Press Trust of India (PTI) for three terms (1998–1999, 2006–2007, and 2012–2013). Additionally, he served as President of the Indian Languages Newspapers Association in Mumbai from 2001 to 2003.

=== Educational initiatives ===
In 1989, Ramasubbaiyer established the Subbalakshmi Lakshmipathy Foundation (SLF), a charitable trust aimed at providing education in the rural areas surrounding Madurai. The foundation operates multiple educational institutions without collecting capitation fees. The institutions managed by the foundation include a CBSE-affiliated school, the Subbalakshmi Lakshmipathy College of Science, the R.L. Institute of Management Studies, the R.L. Institute of Nautical Sciences, and an engineering college. These institutions provide undergraduate and postgraduate courses in disciplines including catering, animation, visual communication, banking, insurance, cyber security, data science, networking, food processing, industrial safety, logistics, and commerce.

=== Academic administration ===
Ramasubbaiyer has held administrative and advisory roles in various educational institutions and government bodies. He was a Senate Member for Madurai Kamaraj University (1989–1991) and Bharathiar University (1997–2000). He served as a Syndicate Member for Madurai Kamaraj University across three terms (2003–2006, 2018–2021, and 2021–2024). His other roles include Secretary of the Madura College Board (1986–1990), President of the Tamil Nadu Unaided Colleges Management Association, and President of the Madurai Kamaraj University Private Colleges Management Association. From 2005 to 2008, he was a member of the National Integration Council under the Ministry of Home Affairs.

== Awards and honours ==
Ramasubbaiyer received honorary Doctor of Letters (D.Litt. - Honoris Causa) degrees from Alagappa University in 2003 and Bharathiar University in 2009. In 2025, the Government of India awarded him the Padma Shri, the country's fourth-highest civilian award, for his contributions to Literature and Education.
