= Bal Ram Nanda =

Indian writer

- Born: 1917
- Died: 30 May 2010 (aged 93)
- Education: Lahore University
- Scientific career
- Fields: History

Bal Ram Nanda (1917 – 30 May 2010) was an Indian historian and biographer from New Delhi. He was the preeminent Indian biographer of Mahatma Gandhi.

== Career ==
After studying history at Lahore University, B.R. Nanda joined the Indian Railways Services, and served as a senior railway officer.

He was the first Director of the Nehru Memorial Museum & Library, New Delhi.

== Awards ==
- Padma Bhushan, 1988,
- Padma Vibhushan, 2003.

== Death ==
Nanda died on 30 May 2010 at his New Delhi residence.

== Works ==
- Mahatma Gandhi: A biography (translated into French, Spanish, Italian and several Indian languages).
- Gandhi and his critics
- Gokhale, Gandhi, and the Nehrus
- In Search of Gandhi: Essays and Reflections
- Gandhi: pan-Islamism, imperialism, and nationalism in India
- Motilal Nehru (Builders of modern India), Publications Division, Ministry of Information and Broadcasting, Govt. of India, 1964
- Socialism in India, Nehru Memorial Museum and Library. Vikas Publications, 1972
- Gandhi: a Pictorial Biography. New Delhi Publications Division, Ministry of Information and Broadcasting. 1972. ISBN 9788123001982. OCLC 540771.
- Gandhi and his critics, Oxford Univ. Pr., 1985
- Road to Pakistan 2010
