= H. M. Desai =

Indian academic administrator

Harshad M. Desai is an educationist and academic from Gujarat, India. He is a vice chancellor of Dharamsinh Desai University in Nadiad, Gujarat.

== Career ==
Desai started his career as a lecturer and later served as the principal and director. He has served as the vice chancellor of the Gujarat University. He has also served as the vice president the Association of Indian Universities for two terms and the president of the same for a term (2014). He is also a member of the Royal Society of Chemistry and a member of the American Institute of Chemical Engineers.

== Awards ==
Desai was awarded the Padma Shri in 2020 for his contribution in literature and education.
