= Jitendra Udhampuri =

Indian writer (born 1944)

- Born: 9 November 1944 (age 81); Udhampur, Jammu and Kashmir, British India
- Occupations: Writer and educationist
- Awards: Padma Shri; Sahitya Akademi Award; J and K Academy Award; J and K Republic Day Award
- Website: Official web site

Jitendra Udhampuri is an Indian writer of Dogri, Hindi and Urdu literature. He is a recipient of the Sahitya Akademi Award in 1981. The Government of India honored him in 2010, with the fourth highest civilian award of Padma Shri.

== Biography ==
Jitendra Undhampuri was born to Jagan Nath as his eldest son, on 9 November 1944 in a small town of Udhampur, near Jammu in the northernmost Indian state of Jammu and Kashmir, in a family with meagre financial resources. He did his schooling in Udhampur and moved to Jammu, where he joined for his graduate studies at the Government Gandhi Memorial Science College. However, due to ailments of his mother, he had to return to Udhampur to take care of the younger children, without completing his studies. Jitendra Udhampur joined the Indian Army but continued his interrupted studies there and took his master's degree in history and doctorate in Dogri. A shift in job followed when he moved to the All India Radio as a broadcaster and continued there till his retirement from there as a director.

Jitendra's literary career started in 1962 when his first poem in Urdu was published. Since then, he has written in Urdu, Hindi and Dogri languages and is credited with 30 books in these languages. Jitto, Dewan-e-Gazals, Duggar Nama, Geet Ganga, Thehra Hua Kothra, Chan-ni, De Do Ek basant (Hindi), Ek Shehar Yadeen Da, Banjara, Kish Kalian Tere naa, Judayian, Pinday di Barat, Basti-Basti, Dil Dariya Khali-Khali, Phool Udaas Hain (Hindi), Woh Ek din (Hindi), and Dil Hoya Darvesh (Punjabi) are some of his notable works. Many of his books have been translated into other languages such as English, Hindi, Urdu, Kashmiri, Nepali and Czech. He has also published two treatises, The History of Dogri Literature and The History of Dogra Culture.

He is a member of the management committee of the Jammu and Kashmir State Red Cross Society and was honoured by the society for his contributions in 2010.

== Awards and recognitions ==
Jitendra Udhampuri has received several awards and honors such as Jammu and Kashmir Academy of Art, Culture and Languages Award which he received four times (1985, 86, 95 and 2004), Rashtriya Hindi Devi Sehsrabdi Samman in 2000, Subhadra Kumari Chouhan Janam Shatabadi Samman, Rashtriya Kari Pandit Shohan Lal Devedi Samman, Dogra Sahitya Rattan Samman in 2004 and Sahitaya Samman.

Some of the other awards he has received are:

- National Award, Central Hindi Directorate, Ministry of Human Resources, New Delhi – 1990
- Senior Fellowship, Union Ministry of Culture – 2007
- Robe of Honour by the governor, Jammu and Kashmir State -1987
- Gold Medal and Certificate of Merit, Government of Jammu and Kashmir – 1993
- Republic Day Award, Government of Jammu and Kashmir – 2005

Udhampuri received the Sahitya Akademi Award in 1981 and in 2010, the Government of India honored him with the fourth highest civilian award of Padma Shri.

== See also ==
- Dogri
