= Antaryami Mishra =

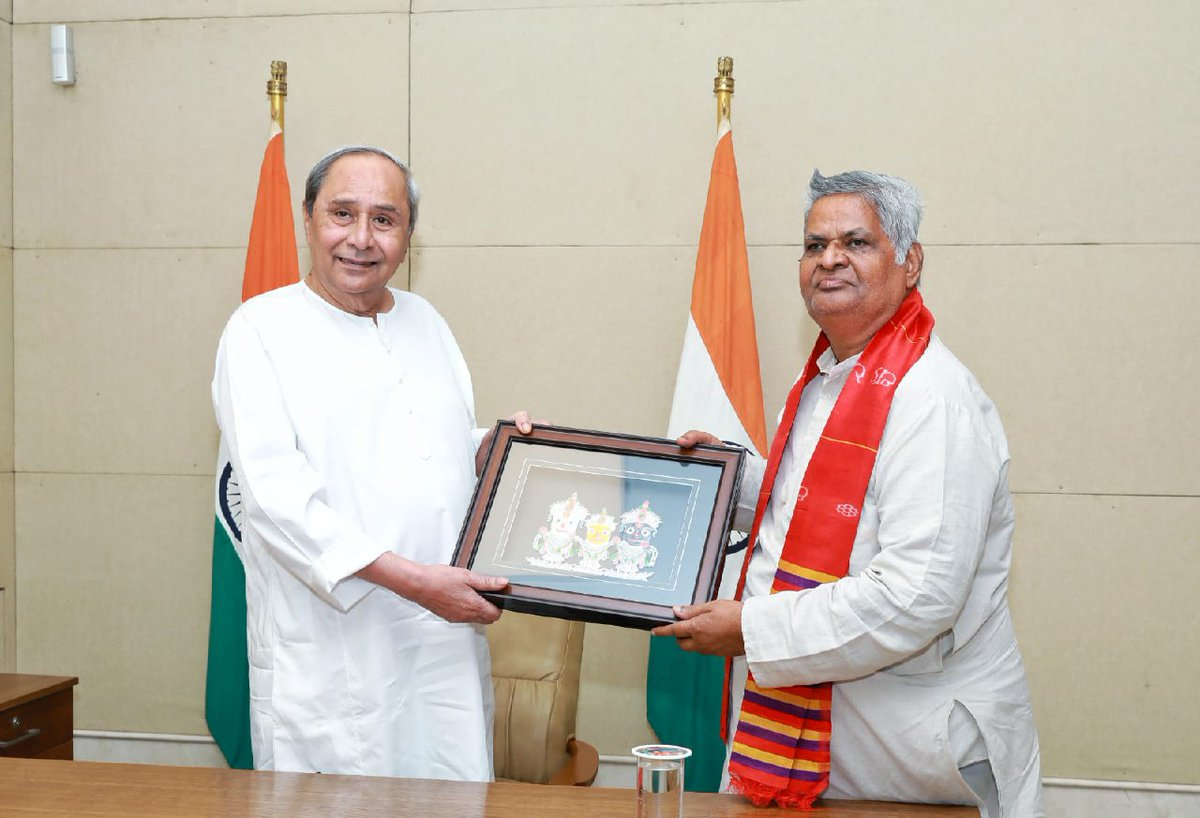
- Antaryami Mishra with former Odisha Chief Minister Naveen Patnaik
- Born: 1 July 1950 (age 76); Marthapur, Dhenkanal district, Odisha, India
- Education: Utkal University
- Occupations: Writer, linguist, cultural researcher
- Writing career
- Notable awards: Padma Shri (2023)

Pandit Antaryami Mishra (born 1 July 1950) is an Indian Odia writer, linguist, and researcher known for his work in Odia language studies, history, and Jagannath culture. He has contributed to scholarship on Odia linguistics and has written extensively on Odisha’s cultural and religious heritage.

== Early life and education ==
Mishra was born in Marthapur village in Dhenkanal district, Odisha, to Satyabadi Mishra and Durgavati Devi. He completed his postgraduate studies at Utkal University. Over the years, he became associated with research and advocacy related to Odia language development and preservation.

== Career ==
Mishra has worked for more than five decades in the field of Odia language, grammar, and regional history. His publication Odia Eka Shastriya Bhasha discussed the classical status of the Odia language. He has also written several works on Lord Jagannath and Odisha’s religious traditions.

He has served as a commentator for Doordarshan during Ratha Yatra broadcasts and has been associated with the Odisha Sahitya Akademi as a nominated member from Dhenkanal district.

== Selected works ==
Some of his published works include:

- Punyapitha Kapilash (1995)
- Purushottama Jagannath (2011)
- Odia Eka Shastriya Bhasha (2013)
- Odia Bhasara Itihasa (2015)
- Moulik Odia Byakarana (2022)

== Awards and honours ==
- Navagunjara Samman (2022)
- Padma Shri (2023) in the field of Literature and Education
