= Usha Yadav =

Indian educationist (born 1948)

Padma Shri Usha Yadav
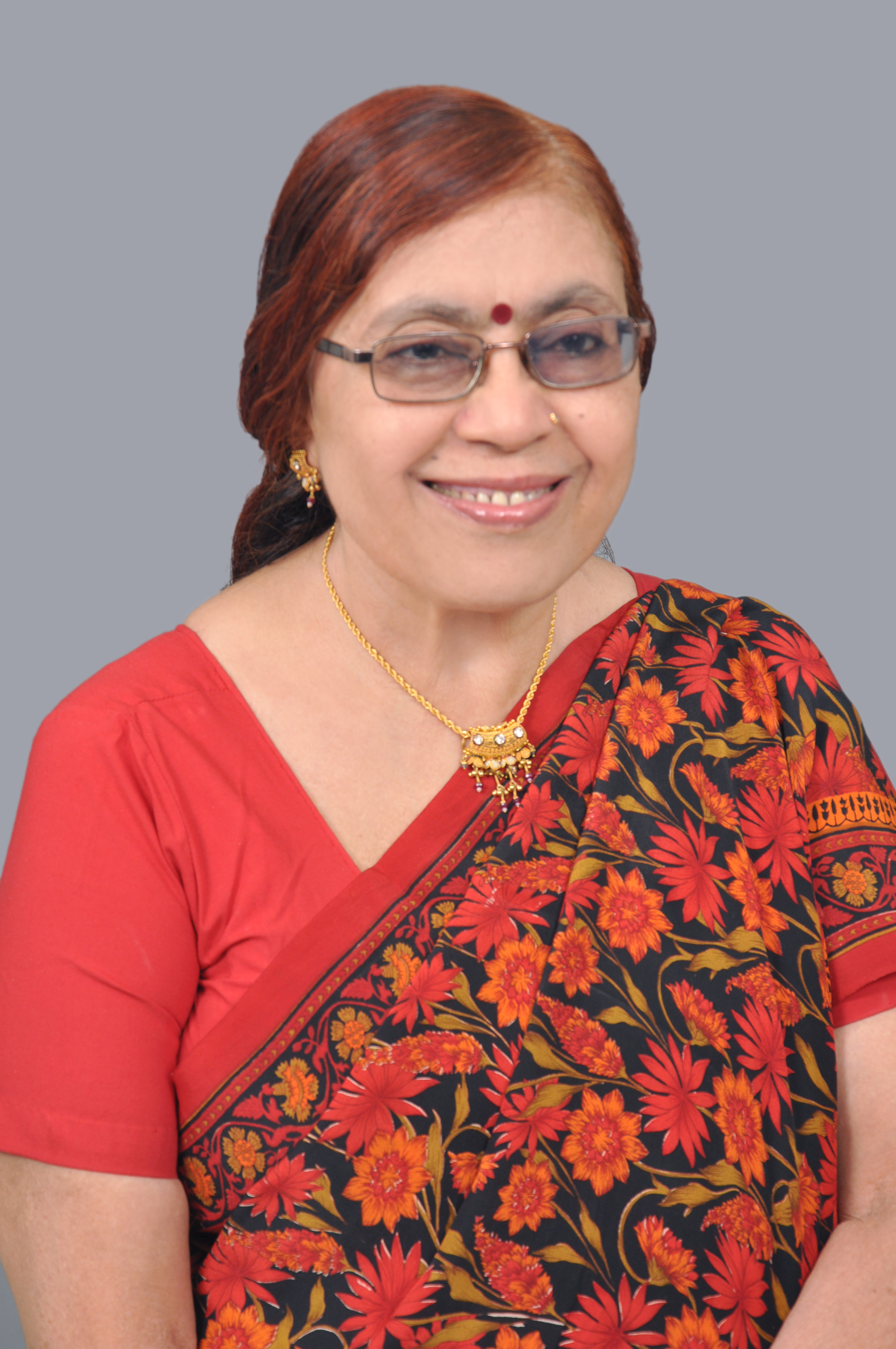
- Born: 1948 (age 77–78); Kanpur, India
- Occupations: Educationist; writer; president, Literary and Cultural Organization Indradhanush; secretary, Oriental Research Institute
- Spouse: Dr. Raj Kishore Singh
- Children: 3
- Parent: Chandrapal Singh Mayank
- Awards: Padma Shri

Academic background
- Education: Ph.D. D. Litt
- Alma mater: Chhatrapati Shahu Ji Maharaj University; Dr. Bhimrao Ambedkar University

Academic work
- Notable works: Kahe Ri Nalini

Usha Yadav is an Indian educationist, writer of contemporary Hindi literature, and recipient of the Padma Shri award. She has been a faculty member at Central Institute of Hindi, Agra, Dr. Bhimrao Ambedkar University, and Kanhaiyalal Maniklal Munshi Institute of Hindi. She is the President of the Literary and Cultural Organization Indradhanush and Secretary of the Oriental Research Institute. She has been honored with over 10 major accolades, including the highest honour of children's literature, the Balsahitya Bharti by UP Hindi Sansthan, Lucknow. She has published more than a hundred books, out of which her novel 'Kahe Ri Nalini' was awarded the All India Veersingh Dev Award by Sahitya Academy, Madhya Pradesh. In 2021, she was honoured with the Padma Shri in the field of Hindi literature and education at the Rashtrapati Bhavan, New Delhi by the Government of India, which is the fourth-highest civilian award of the Republic of India.

== Biography ==
Born in 1948 in Kanpur, Usha spent her childhood in the city and attended school and college there as well.

Since childhood, Dr. Usha Yadav had a passion for writing poems, which began at the age of nine when her first poem was published in her school magazine. Her father, Chandrapal Singh Mayank, was a child litterateur and advocate which led to him wanting Usha to pursue a career in law. However, her interest laid in teaching and writing, and she passed high school at the age of 12.

In 1966 she moved to Agra to marry her husband Dr. Raj Kishore Singh, a retired professor and former member of the Uttar Pradesh Higher Education Service Commission. Usha was passionate about writing, but due to fear of her husband's disapproval, she would burn her work. One day he discovered her writings and instead of reprimanding her, he encouraged her to continue writing. Usha stayed in Agra for the next 30 years, working as a teacher and professor whilst her family, including two sons and a daughter Kamna Singh, settled there.

Usha completed her Ph.D. from Kanpur University (now Chhatrapati Shahu Ji Maharaj University) and then went on to attain her D. Litt from Agra University. After this, she took up a teaching position in an educational institution in Agra. Later, she was appointed as a Professor at Dr. Bhimrao Ambedkar University in Agra, from where she retired. In addition to her academic career, Dr. Usha Yadav has also been actively involved in the preservation of Braj culture. Her articles have been published in various newspapers and magazines, and she has authored more than 100 books, including the story collection Tukde Tukde Sukh, Sapno Ka Indradhanush, Novel Aankhon Ka Akash, and Prakash Ki Or.

== Awards ==
Dr. Usha Yadav has been recognized for her novel "Dhoop" with the National Human Rights Commission's Mahatma Gandhi Biennial Hindi Writing Award. She has also been awarded the Bal Sahitya Bharti Puraskar in 1998 from Uttar Pradesh Hindi Sansthan, the Meera Smriti Samman from Meera Foundation in Allahabad, the Madhya Pradesh Sahitya Akademi Award and more than 10 other awards including the Bharatendu Harishchandra Awards from the Uttar Pradesh Government in 2004. She was also honored by Child Welfare and Children's Literature Research Center in Bhopal.
