= Kunwar Singh Negi =

Indian braille editor and social worker

- Born: 1927; Pauri, Uttarakhand, India
- Died: 20 March 2014 (aged 86–87); Dehradun, Uttarakhand, India
- Occupations: Braille editor, social worker
- Awards: Padma Shri (1981); Padma Bhushan (1990)

Kunwar Singh Negi (1927 – 20 March 2014) was an Indian braille editor and social worker. He has transliterated 300 books into braille. His major works include Bhagwan Buddha Ka Updesh and Hazrat Muhammad Ki Vani, both being about teachings of Gautam Buddha and Muhammad. He was presented with Indian civilian awards Padma Shri in 1981 and later with Padma Bhushan in 1990.

== Life ==
Negi was born in Pauri, a town now in the north Indian state of Uttarakhand in 1927. He fought in Burma as part of the Indian Army during World War II. He credits the British officers to have infused compassion and discipline in him. In 1954, after India's independence from British rule, he joined the National Institute of Visually Handicapped at Dehradun where he started taking interest in braille. Negi started transcribing books in various Indian languages like Punjabi, Bengali, Urdu, Gujarati, Oriya, Marathi and also in Russian. He has worked on 300 books which include Sikh scriptures like Sukhmani Sahib and transcribed works of Gautam Buddha and Muhammad.

Negi was also active in social work for blind and was associated with Bharat Netrahin Samaj in Punjab and the National Federation of Blind in Delhi. His various religious works were distributed free of cost through the Maharaja Ranjit Singh International Mission for Gurbani Braille Literature. He also transliterated politician Surjit Singh Barnala's book My Other Two Daughters.

Negi was honoured with Padma Shri, Indian's fourth-highest civilian award in 1981 for his social work. In 1990, he was presented with Padma Bhushan, the third-highest award for his contributions in the field of literature and education. He was also presented with Sikh Gaurav award by the Shiromani Gurdwara Parbandhak Committee.

In 2003, Negi underwent an operation on his prostate gland with funds received from the then Uttarakhand government headed by N. D. Tiwari as Chief Minister. In 2009, Negi highlighted his financial plight in media when he could not afford an artificial cardiac pacemaker and was not being provided any help by the government. He had received incomplete treatment due to lack of funds at the GB Pant Hospital in New Delhi. He died on 20 March 2014 at Dehradun.
