= Dhaneswar Engti =

Karbi Writer

- Born: 1 November 1955 (age 70); Palam Engti Gaon, Dengaon, Karbi Anglong District, Assam
- Education: Guwahati University, M.A.
- Occupations: Writer, lyricist
- Awards: Padma Shri, 2022

Dhaneswar Engti (born 1 November 1955) is a poet-author from the Indian State of Assam promoting the use of the endangered Karbi language spoken by the Karbi (also known as Mikir or Arleng) people of Northeastern India. Engti has authored 19 books and written around 100 songs in the Karbi language. He has also served as the Joint Secretary of Karbi Anglong Autonomous Council. In the year 2022, Govt. of India conferred on him the Padma Shri award for his work towards the preservation and advancement of indigenous languages.

== Early life ==
Dhaneswar Engti started his education at Merrok Govt M.E. School, Dengaon and passed his HSLC examination in 1972. He secured B A degree in English Language and Literature in 1978 from Govt College, Diphu and MA degree in English in 1981 from Gauhati University. He served the Karbi Anglong Autonomous Council as Joint Secretary and retired from service in 2017.

Dhaneswar Engti started writing while he was a school student. Initially he wrote in Karbi language for publishing in the school magazines and in Karbi monthly magazines published from Dengaon and Diphu. Later he started writing in the Assamese language when he joined Govt Aided High School, Dengaon. He also started writing songs in Karbi language for presentation in public meetings and cultural functions. Altogether, Engti has authored 19 books and written around 100 songs in the Karbi language.

== Recognition: Padma Shri ==
- In the year 2022, Govt of India conferred the Padma Shri award, the third highest award in the Padma series of awards, on Dhaneswar Engti for his distinguished service in the field of literature and education. The award is in recognition of his service as a "Karbi Author and Poet from Karbi Anglong working towards the preservation and advancement of indigenous languages".

== Other recognitions/achievements ==
- Kristinandan Literary Award in 2017

== Publications ==
- "A Glimpse of Greatness Karbi National Icons", Global Publishing House, 2012
- "Wedding of a Bride", Global Publishing House (India), 2012
- "My awesome love", Global Publishing House, January 2012
- "Socio-cultural and spiritual traditions of Assam", Heritage Foundation, January 2012
- "Candle of the Night", Global Publishing House
- "The Endless Journey of a Poet", Global Publishing House

== See also ==
- Padma Shri Award recipients in the year 2022
