= Jaibhagwan Goyal =

Indian professor of literature

Jaibhagwan Goyal also known as Prof. J. B. Goyal is an Indian littérateur, academic, professor who is credited for discovering 17th to 19th century Hindi literary works in Gurumukhi manuscripts. He is notable for his contribution to Sikh literature He was former Professor in the Hindi Department and served as the Dean of the Faculty of Arts and Languages, Kurukshetra University in Haryana.

He has written over 30 books and published 200 research papers in national and international journals. A former chairman of the Hindi Department of Kurukshetra University and has been a UGC Emeritus Fellow. Most of his books were published from published from reputed research institutes like Kurukshetra University, Punjab Language Department, Haryana Sahitya Akademi, Granth Academy, Haryana Urdu Academy, Guru Gobind Singh Foundation, Chandigarh and Shiromani Gurdwara Prabandhak Committee. He was conferred Padma Shri in 2021 for his contribution to literature and education.
