= Anil Kumar Boro =

Indian academic and folklorist

- Born: 9 December 1961 (age 64); Kahitama, Assam, India
- Occupations: Professor, Scholar, Author
- Awards: Padma Shri (2025), Sahitya Akademi Award (2013)

Academic background
- Education: Gauhati University (Ph.D.)

Academic work
- Notable works: A History of Bodo Literature, Delphini Onthai Mwadai Arw Gubun Gubun Khonthai

Anil Kumar Boro (born 9 December 1961) is an Indian academic and folklorist known for his contributions to Bodo literature and folklore studies. He heads the Department of Folklore Studies at Gauhati University, and was awarded the Padma Shri in 2025 for his work in literature and education.

== Early life and education ==
Anil Kumar Boro was born on 9 December 1961 at Kahitama village near the Manas National Park, Assam, India. He completed his schooling at NKB High School, Kahitama, and pursued higher education at B.H. College, Howly. Then at Gauhati University he earned a master's degree in English literature and a Ph.D. in folklore studies.

== Career ==
Boro began his academic career as a lecturer in English at Dimoria College, Khetri, in 1988. In 2000, he joined the Department of Folklore Studies at Gauhati University, where he heads of the Department. His research focuses on folk literature, postmodernism, and Bodo literature, significantly contributing to the study and preservation of indigenous cultures in India.

=== Literary contributions ===
Boro has authored several books and research papers on Bodo folklore and literature. His notable works include:

- A History of Bodo Literature
- Delphini Onthai Mwadai Arw Gubun Gubun Khonthai (which won him the Sahitya Akademi Award in 2013)

His writings have played a crucial role in documenting and preserving Bodo folklore, making them accessible to wider academic and cultural audiences.

== Achievements and recognition ==
- Padma Shri (2025) – For contributions to literature and education
- Sahitya Akademi Award (2013)– For his poetry collection
- Rangsar Literary Award – Awarded by the Bodo Sahitya Sabha
- Participated in various international literary festivals such as the Obidos International Literature Festival (Portugal, 2019) and the SOA Literature Festival (Bhubaneswar, 2024).
- Presented research papers at prestigious conferences, including the International Society for Folk Narrative Research (ISFNR) Conference in Italy (2018).

== Personal life ==
Anil Kumar Boro keeps his personal life private. He is known for mentoring young researchers and students in folklore studies. His dedication to education and literature has earned him great respect in academic circles.

== Legacy and impact ==
Boro's work has played a significant role in promoting Bodo culture and language. His research has contributed to preserving indigenous knowledge systems and fostering a deeper understanding of Assam’s literary traditions. His scholarly contributions continue to inspire upcoming generations of writers and folklorists.

== See also ==
- Folklore of India
- Sahitya Akademi Award
- Gauhati University
