= Rutger Kortenhorst =

Teacher of Sanskrit in Dublin, Ireland

Rutger Kortenhorst is a teacher of Sanskrit in John Scottus Senior School in Dublin, Ireland. John Scottus School is a private school which has been teaching Sanskrit as a compulsory subject since its inception in 1986. In 2022, the Government of India honored him with the Padma Shri award for his dedicated work to propagate the Sanskrit language in Ireland.

== Life and work ==
Rutger Kortenhorst, who had his education at St Benildus College, a catholic only boys' secondary school in Dublin, Ireland and at Trinity College Dublin, became interested in the Advaita Vedanta philosophy when he was 21 years old and was studying at Trinity College Dublin. He was initiated to the world of Advaita Vedanta by reading The Ten Principal Upanishads, an English translation of the ten principal Upanishads by the Irish poet W. B. Yeats published in 1938. About a year later, he began to read Vedic Mathematics a book written by the Indian monk Bharati Krishna Tirtha first published in 1965. All these kindled an interest in the Sanskrit language in Rutger Kortenhorst and he visited India several times to learn the Sanskrit language. He stayed as a guest of Dr Ramachandra Bhat in Veda Vijnana Gurukulam, Bangalore in the months of June and July in the years 2006 and 2007. Subsequently, he spent the period from June 2008 to August 2009 in the Gurukulam to develop a new method of teaching Sanskrit to children in the Western world. During this period, he also attended Sanskrit conversation camps at several places in India and spent a few fortnights with Dr Narendra in Sri Aurobindo Ashram, Pondicherry. Dr Narendra is in charge of the Sanskrit Karyalaya, a unit of the Aurobindo Ashram established to promote and popularize a simple form of Sanskrit.

Since 2016, Rutger Kortenhorst is running a Junior Certificate Course on Wellbeing targeted at 12-15 years old children. The course is based on the principles of Ayurveda, an alternative medicine system developed in the Indian subcontinent, and of Yoga.

== Recognition: Padma Shri ==
- In the year 2022, Government of India conferred the Padma Shri award, the third highest award in the Padma series of awards, on Rutger Kortenhorst for his distinguished service in the field of education and literature. The award is in recognition of his service as an "Irish Sanskrit Scholar promoting Ayurveda, Sanskrit and Yoga globally."

== Other prizes and recognitions ==
- In the year 2020, Rutger Kortenhorst was awarded The World Sanskrit Prize by the Indian Council for Cultural Relations.
- Narendra Modi, Prime Minister of India, paid tribute to Rutger Kortenhorst in the episode of the Mann Ki Baat programme broadcast on 29 August 2021. In the programme, Modi said: " . . . Recently, I got to know about many such people who are engaged in the inspirational work of teaching Sanskrit in foreign lands. One such person is Mr. Rutger Kortenhorst, a well-known Sanskrit scholar and teacher in Ireland who teaches Sanskrit to the children there. Sanskrit language also plays an important role in the strengthening of cultural relations between India and Ireland . . ."

== See also ==
- Padma Shri Award recipients in the year 2022

== Additional reading ==
- "Why does my child study Sanskrit?" A talk by Rutger Kortenhorst
- "Why we do Sanskrit in this school?" by Rutger Kortenhorst
