= Yashwant Singh Kathoch =

Indian historian and author

Dr. Yashwant Singh Kathoch
- Born: 27 December 1935 (age 90); Mason village, Pauri Garhwal district, Uttarakhand, India
- Education: Agra University (MA), Hemwati Nandan Bahuguna Garhwal University (PhD)
- Occupations: Historian, Archaeologist, Author
- Known for: Contribution to the history and archaeology of Uttarakhand
- Awards: Padma Shri (2024)

Yashwant Singh Kathoch (born 27 December 1935) is an Indian historian, archaeologist, and author known for his work on the history, archaeology, culture, and art of the Uttarakhand region of India. He was awarded the Padma Shri, India's fourth-highest civilian award, in 2024 in the field of literature and education.

== Early life and career ==
Kathoch was born in Mason village in the Pauri Garhwal district of Uttarakhand, Kathoch. He pursued higher education at Agra University, earning a Master's degree in Ancient Indian History, Culture and Archaeology. He later completed his PhD in History and Archaeology from Hemwati Nandan Bahuguna Garhwal University.

Katoch worked as a teacher for 33 years within the government education system in Uttarakhand and retired as a principal 1995. Following his retirement, he dedicated his time to research and writing on the history and archaeology of the Himalayan region.

Kathoch has authored over 12 books, focusing on the history, archaeology, and cultural heritage of Uttarakhand. His notable works include "Uttarakhand Ka Naveen Itihaas" (Modern History of Uttarakhand), "Madhya Himalaya Ka Puratattva" (Archaeology of Central Himalaya), "Sanskriti Ke Pad Chihn" (Footprints of Culture), "Madhya Himalaya Ki Kala" (Art of Central Himalaya), and "Bharatvarshiya Etihasik Sthalakosh" (Historical Gazetteer of India). He's currently working on two books "Uttarakhand ki Sainya Parampara" and "Yashodhara." He was also a founder member of the Uttarakhand Research Centre, established in 1973.

== Awards and recognition ==
In January 2024, the Government of India conferred Padma Shri award upon Yashwant Singh Kathoch recognizing his lifelong dedication to preserving and documenting the historical and cultural heritage of the Himalayan region through his research and writings.

=== Selected awards ===
- Pahar Foundation Rajat Samman (2010)
- Varishth Vabhuti Samman by Sanskrit, Sahitya Evam Kala Parishad of Uttarakhand Government (2006)
- Akhil Garhwal Sabha (2002)
- Princep Award (1965)
