= Prabhakar Bhanudas Mande =

- Born: 16 December 1933; Maharashtra, India
- Died: 21 December 2023 (aged 90); Chhatrapati Sambhajinagar, Maharashtra, India
- Occupations: Scholar, folklorist, educator
- Known for: Marathi folk literature
- Awards: Padma Shri (2023)

Prabhakar Bhanudas Mande (16 December 1933 – 21 December 2023) was an Indian scholar of folklore, folk culture, and literature from Maharashtra. He was associated with the academic study and institutionalisation of folklore in higher education in Maharashtra. He received the Padma Shri in 2023 in the field of Literature and Education.

== Early life and education ==
Mande was born on 16 December 1933 in Maharashtra. He completed his Ph.D. in 1967 with a focus on analytical studies of folklore.

== Academic career ==
He began his career in 1955 as a teacher at a government school in Pishor, Aurangabad district. In 1961, he joined Shri Shivaji College, Parbhani. He later served as a Reader at Marathwada University for 17 years and retired as a senior professor in 1993.

== Research and contributions ==
Mande conducted field research on folklore and folk artists and documented folk songs, oral narratives, and performance traditions. In 1973, Dr. Babasaheb Ambedkar Marathwada University included folklore at the postgraduate level; Mande contributed to syllabus preparation and authored prescribed textbooks for the subject. He established the Loksahitya Research Centre and organised academic seminars in Maharashtra and Goa.

== Selected works ==
- Gawgadya Baher
- Ramkathechi Maukhik Parampara
- Lokrangbhoomi
- Mangani Thyanche Magte

== Awards ==
- Sangeet Natak Akademi Award, 2022
- Padma Shri, 2023
