= Renthlei Lalrawna =

- Born: 22 December 1940 (age 85); Dawn, Lunglei district, Mizoram, India
- Education: Pachhunga Memorial College, Gauhati University
- Occupations: Writer, Translator, Educational Administrator
- Known for: Chief Editor of Gilzom Publication, Mizo literature
- Awards: Padma Shri (2025), Bhasha Samman (2023)

Renthlei Lalrawna, born on 22 December 1940, is an Indian Mizo-language writer, translator, and educational administrator. He is recognized for his contributions to Mizo literature and language promotion. He served as the Joint Director of School Education in Mizoram and is the Chief Editor of Gilzom Publication. In 2025, the Government of India awarded him the Padma Shri for his services in the fields of literature and education.

== Early life and education ==
Lalrawna was born in the village of Dawn, located in the Lunglei district of Mizoram. He completed his primary and secondary education locally before earning a Bachelor of Arts degree from Pachhunga Memorial College in 1963. He later pursued further studies, obtaining a Master's degree from Gauhati University in 1975.

== Career in education ==
Lalrawna began his career as a Lower Division Clerk and gradually advanced within the Education Department of the Government of Mizoram. He eventually became the Joint Director of School Education, specifically heading the Adult Education Wing. During his tenure, he formulated action plans, produced textbooks, and launched state-wide literacy campaigns. He collaborated with various non-governmental organizations, including the Young Mizo Association, Mizo Hmeichhe Insuihkhawm Pawl, churches, and village councils, to promote adult education. These initiatives contributed significantly to the literacy rate of Mizoram, which increased from 59 percent in the 1981 census to 88.49 percent in 1991, making Mizoram the state with the second-highest literacy rate in India. He retired from government service on January 1, 2003.

== Literary contributions ==
Lalrawna is a prominent novelist, essayist, and critic in the Mizo language. He has authored fourteen original volumes and translated fifteen books from English into Mizo. His translations include works by William Shakespeare, Marie Corelli, Lloyd C. Douglas, Jules Verne, Franklin G. Slaughter, and John Bunyan. He also met Mother Teresa in Calcutta and subsequently wrote a book about her and the Missionaries of Charity. In addition, Lalrawna compiled a widely used collection of Mizo songs titled Mizo Rohlu. Two of his books and one essay have been prescribed in the academic syllabi by the Mizoram Board of School Education and Mizoram University. He is the Chief Editor of Gilzom Publication and was instrumental in the founding and editing of Meichher, a Mizo literary magazine.

== Administrative roles and recognition ==
Lalrawna has served as the President of the Mizo Writers Association. He is an expert member of the Mizoram Publication Board and a member of the Mizo Language Committee. For his literary contributions, he received a Literary Award from the Mizo Writers Association. The Sahitya Akademi conferred the Bhasha Samman on him for the year 2023, which was officially presented on August 29, 2024. In 2025, he was awarded the Padma Shri by the Government of India.
