= Ralte L. Thanmawia =

Indian educator and writer (born 1958)

- Born: 28 September 1958 (age 66); Mizoram, India
- Occupation(s): Educationist, writer
- Parent: Vanlalliana
- Awards: Padma Shri
- Website: Official web site

Ralte L. Thanmawia is an Indian educator and writer from Mizoram.

== Education ==
Dr Ralte L Thanmawia completed his bachelor's in 1979 and his master's in 1981 and finally completed his PhD in 1989 from NEHU.

== Career ==
He started his career as LDC with Government of Mizoram in 1976 and then worked in Government Aizawl College in 1981, then joined Pachhunga University College in 1989 and finally joined Mizoram University in 2004 till 2020. He is now a retired professor of Mizoram Department.

== Awards and Honros ==
- Thanmawia was honored by the Government of India, in 2012, with the fourth highest Indian civilian award of Padma Shri.
- He was also awarded the Mizo Academy of Letters in 2016.

== Publications ==
Some of the Publications by Prof L Thanmawia are:

- KathiPekCheKha - 1987
- Hla Thu Hrilhfiahna - 1988
- ZofateRohlu - 1992
- ZinkawngRapthlakZawhtute - 1994
- Chuailo I - 1997/2011
- Senmei (Poetry) - 1997
- Mizo Poetry - 1998
- Ngirtling - 2005 (2005)
- Lung Min Lentu - 2006
- Mizo HnahthlakThawnthuVol-I - 2008/2018 98-81-935328-7-4
- Chuailo 2 - 2010
- Mizo Values - 2011
- Mizo HnahthlakThawnthuVol.III - 2012
- Mizo HlaHlui - 2012/2018 978-81- 935328-
- ZasiamalehSialkhawthanga - 2012
- Chuailo 3 - 2015
- Hla Thu Dictionary - 2016 978-93-85263-49- 1
- ZanlaiThlifim - 2016/2018 978-81- 935455-8-4
- . Mizo Folktales - 2017 978-81- 260537-0-1
- Chuailo 4 - 2018 978-81-935455-9-1
- Prepared & Pub. Mizo Cultural & Historical Map - 2009

== See also ==
- Mizoram University
