= Kethavath Somlal =

- Born: 8 August 1959 (age 66); Akuthota Bavi Thanda, Yadadri Bhuvanagiri district, Telangana, India
- Education: Osmania University
- Occupations: Writer, Folk Artist, Translator
- Known for: Translating the Bhagavad Gita into Lambadi
- Awards: Padma Shri

Kethavath Somlal (born; 8 August 1959) is an Indian writer, translator, and folk artist from Telangana. He is a member of the Lambadi community and is known for his work in documenting and promoting Banjara culture and language. The Government of India awarded him the Padma Shri in 2024 for his contributions to literature and education.

== Early life and career ==
Somlal was born on 8 August 1959 in Akuthota Bavi Thanda, a hamlet in the Yadadri Bhuvanagiri district of Telangana. He completed his higher education at Osmania University in Hyderabad, earning a Master of Arts, a Master of Philosophy, a Bachelor of Education, and a Bachelor of Laws. He was employed at the State Bank of India and served as a deputy manager until he retired under the Voluntary Retirement Scheme in 2013.

== Cultural and literary work ==
Somlal has collected and performed traditional folk songs from rural Banjara settlements known as tandas. He has recorded musical albums and performed on All India Radio and Doordarshan. He has written devotional songs about figures such as Sevalal Maharaj, Hathiram Bavoji, Merama Mai, Tulja Bhavani, Venkateswara, and Anjaneya Swamy.

In 1986, he published the play Tholi Velugu. In 1987, he wrote a historical account of the Banjara community titled Coolie lu Palerlu ga marina okappati Raja Putra Lambadilu, which was serialized in the Andhra Bhoomi newspaper.

In 1990, Somlal began translating 701 shlokas of the Bhagavad Gita into the Lambadi language. He submitted the manuscript to the Tirumala Tirupati Devasthanam press. The press published the Banjara Bhagavad Gita in 2014. The book was released by the then Chief Justice of India, H. L. Dattu, and Justice N. V. Ramana during the Tirumala Srivari Brahmotsavam. In 2021, the Department of Tribal Welfare of the Telangana government published his Lambadi-Telugu dictionary, the Banjara Telugu Padakosham.

== Awards ==
The All India Banjara Seva Sangh awarded Somlal the title of Banjara Janapada Brahma in 2001. He received the Swarna Kankanam in 2006. In 2013, the Heera Bai Banjara Memorial Trust awarded him the Banjara Kala Ratna. The Government of Telangana presented him with the Uttama Kalakar award on Telangana Formation Day in 2017, and the state's Department of Language and Culture recognized him as the Best Folk Artist the same year. He was awarded the Banjara Ratna by the Swamy Naik Memorial Society in 2020. In 2024, he received the Padma Shri, India's fourth-highest civilian award.
