= Jagadish Joshila =

Indian writer

- Born: Khargone, Madhya Pradesh, India
- Occupations: Writer, novelist
- Awards: Padma Shri (2025)

Jagadish Joshila is an Indian writer and novelist known for his contributions to Nimadi literature. He was awarded the Padma Shri in 2025 for his work in preserving and promoting the cultural and literary heritage of the Nimar region in Madhya Pradesh.

== Early life and education ==
Jagadish Joshila hails from the Khargone district of Madhya Pradesh. He developed a passion for literature from a young age, which later became the foundation of his literary career.

== Literary contributions ==
Joshila has authored numerous works in Nimari, a regional language spoken in parts of Madhya Pradesh. His writings focus on folklore, cultural narratives, and traditional themes that depict the lifestyle and history of the Nimar region. His ability to blend literature with folk traditions has earned him recognition.

== Awards ==
In 2025, the Government of India honored him with the Padma Shri, one of the country’s highest civilian awards, the fourth highest, for his exceptional work in literature and folk music.
