= Govindbhai Shroff =

Indian activist (1911–2002)

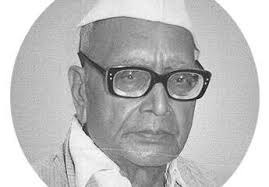
- Born: 24 July 1911; Bijapur, Karnataka
- Died: 21 November 2002 (aged 91); Aurangabad, Maharashtra
- Known for: Liberation of Marathwada from Nizam rule Work in field of Literature and Education
- Awards: Padma Vibhushan (1992)

Govinddas Mannulal Shroff (1911–2002), was an Indian freedom fighter who led people of Marathwada region in a fight against the Nizam of Hyderabad during the Hyderabad Campaign of 1948. As a result, the Marathwada region was liberated from the Hyderabad State on 17 September 1948.

Shroff served as the longest serving secretary and president of the Saraswati Bhuvan Education Society. He was awarded the second highest civilian award of India the Padma Vibhushan in 1992 for his work in the field of literature and education.

Later in 1966, people responded to the call of Shroff by taking part in hunger strikes, morchas, rail rokos, bandhs and other form of protests to press for a broad gauge train routes.

== See also ==
- this early life
