= Ravindra Kumar (political scientist) =

Indian political scientist

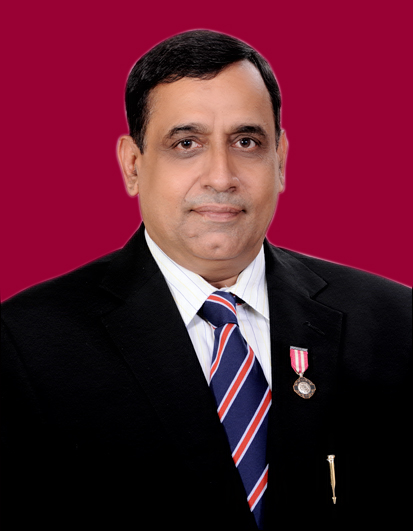
- Born: 1 January 1959 (age 67); Meerut, India
- Occupations: Writer, columnist, political scientist
- Spouse: Kamlesh (1981–2020)
- Website: ravindrakumar.org

Ravindra Kumar (born 1959) is a Political Scientist, Peace Educator, an Indologist, a Humanist, Cultural Anthropologist and a former Vice-Chancellor of CCS University, Meerut (India).

He has worked an Ombudsman of Swami Vivekananda Subharati University, Meerut and the editor-in-chief of Global Peace International Journal. He has written more than one hundred books and four hundred articles on greatest personalities of the Indian sub-continent, especially Gautama Buddha, Swami Vivekananda, Mahatma Gandhi, Sardar Vallabhbhai Patel and on various social, political, educational, cultural and academic issues to his credit.

== Early life and education ==
Born in 1959 at Kakrauli village of Muzaffarnagar district in Uttar Pradesh, India, he is M.A. in political science and philosophy, PGD in Gandhian studies, Ph.D. and D.Lit.

== Career ==
A well-known Indologist and the former vice-chancellor of CCS University Meerut, India, Kumar has been associated with several national and international academic, cultural, educational, peace and social bodies/institutions/organizations. As an international professor and a cultural ambassador of India, he has delivered more than four hundred lectures at various institutions and universities of the world on subjects related to Asian values, civilization, culture, Gandhian philosophy, Indology, international co-operation and understanding, leadership, way of life, women's empowerment, world peace, youth affairs etc.

As a peace worker, Kumar started Peace Review – an international journal of peace studies in 1998 and worked as its editor-in-chief. In 2001 he has started Global Peace – another international journal of philosophy, peace, education, culture and civilization. Besides, he has inspired hundred and thousands of people all over the world for their commitment towards non-violence by signing pledges.

Between 1993 and 2015 Ravindra Kumar has organised a number of seminars, symposiums and workshops at national and international level on subjects related to value education, religion and politics, non-violence and democracy, morality and ethics in public life, human values and rights, education, peace and development, Gandhian philosophy.

== Books ==
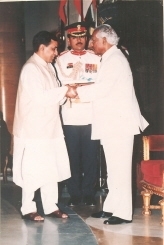
Dr. Ravindra Kumar Receiving Padma Shri from The President Dr. K R Narayanan in 2001

- Religion and Word Peace (1993-2006)
- Morality and Ethics in Public Life (1999)
- Towards Peace, two-parts (2001-7)
- Theory and Practice of Gandhian Non-Violence (2002-7)
- Non-Violence and Its Philosophy (2003)
- Five Thousand Years of Indian Culture (2003)
- Fundamentals of Civilization (2006)
- Sardar Vallabhbhai Patel: Life, Works and Views (2005–12)
- Towards Buddha (2007), Gandhian Thought: New World, New Dimensions (2008)
- India and Mahatma Gandhi (2009–10)
- Peace Philosophy in Action (2010)
- Resolving Conflicts: The Gandhian Way (2011)
- Education, Peace and Development (2012)
- Gandhi in Current Perspective (2012)
- The Indian Way (2013)
- The Gandhian Way: A Universal Method of Resolving Conflicts (2013)
- Non-Violence and Peace Education, two-parts (2013)
- Facets of Education in Global Perspective (2013-5)
- Unveiling the Universality of Indology and Indian Philosophy (2015)
- Value and Peace Education (2016)
- Essays on Socio-Cultural Sensitization, Empowerment and Human Rights (2016)
- Sanatana Dharma –The Vedic-Hindu Jeevan Marg (2016)
- Gandhi Marg (2016)
- Gandhi's Vision of the World in the Light of Indian Philosophy (2018)
- Greatest Indians –a multi-volume series (2016-8).

== Positions ==
Teacher, Department of Political Science, SD College, Muzaffarnagar, Uttar Pradesh (1982-3), Research Representative/Senior Research Officer, Sardar Patel National Memorial, Ahmedabad/Sardar Patel Works Committee, New Delhi (1985–90), Member Secretary and Chief Editor of Vithalbhai Patel Works Committee (1990–92), Vice Chancellor, CCS University, Meerut, India (1994), Visiting Professor, Department of Philosophy and Religion, Prince of Songkla University, Pattani Campus, Thailand (1996-2001), Visiting Professor/Scholar at more than one hundred Universities/Institutions of higher studies and research around the world including Ateneo de Manila University (Philippines), Universities of Thammasat, Silpakorn, Mahidol, Kasetsart and Chulalongkorn (Thailand), Universities of Malaya, Kuala Lumpur and Malaysia Science, Penang (Malaysia), Universities of Mandalay and Yangon (Myanmar), Udayana University, Bali (Indonesia), Institute Kern, Leiden University (The Netherlands), Universities of Aalborg, Aarhus, NIAS Copenhagen and Odense (Denmark), St. Petersburg State University (Russia), Jaume-I University, Castellon (Spain), University of Torino (Italy), University of Vienna (Austria), North Florida University, Jacksonville, Florida (USA), Universities of Autonomic Latin-American, Antioquia, EAFIT, Pontificia Bolivariana and Externado de Colombia (Columbia), Universidad de Especialidades Espíritu Santo –the UEES, Guayaquil (Ecuador, South America), University of Kwazulu-Natal, Durban (South Africa)(1995-2019), Ombudsman, Swami Vivekananda Subharati University, Meerut, India (since 2013), Patron/Chairman, Director and Coordinator for international relations of many universities and institutions of higher studies and research in India and other countries of Asia.

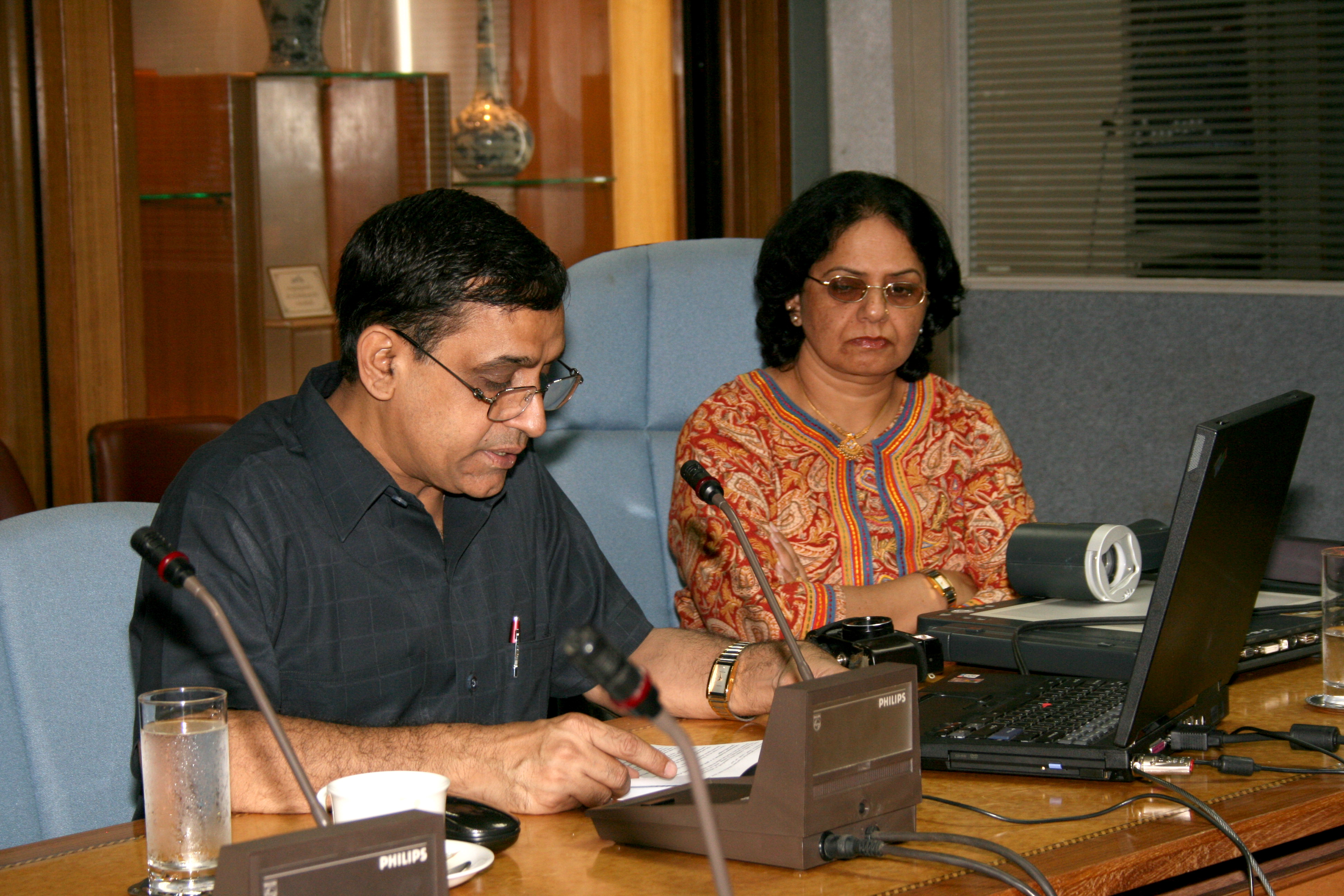
Speaking at Mahidol University, Thailand in 2008

== Memberships ==
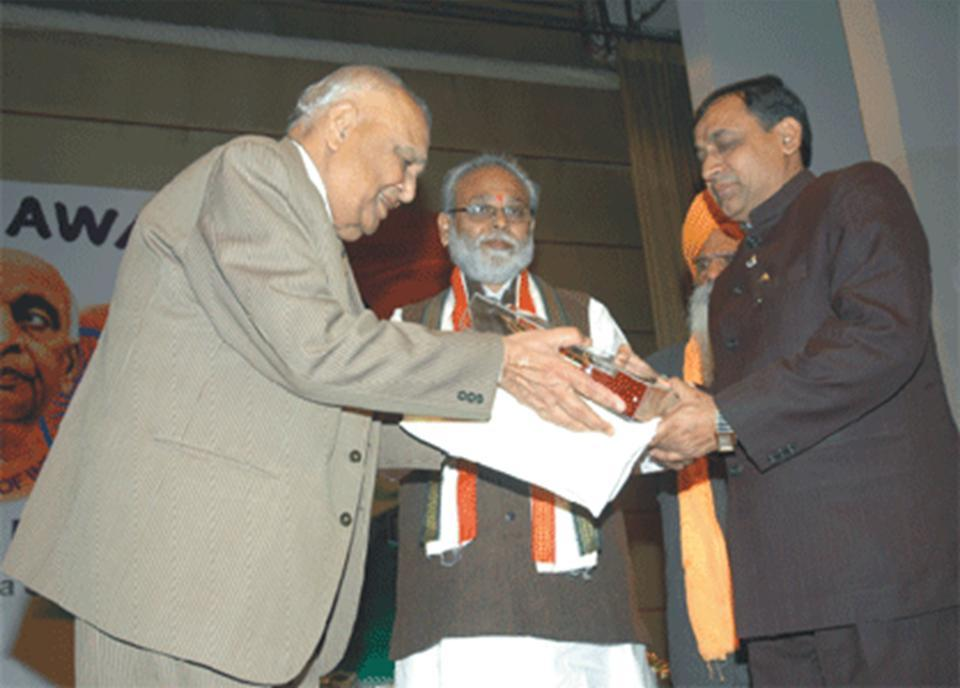
Receiving Sardar Patel National Award in 2006 from Lt. General S.K. Sinha, Governor of J&K

- Member, Executive Council, Meerut University, Meerut, India, between 1993 and 1994
- Member, Executive Council, MD University, Rohtak, India, between 1994 and 1996
- Vice-Chancellor, CCS University, India, 1994

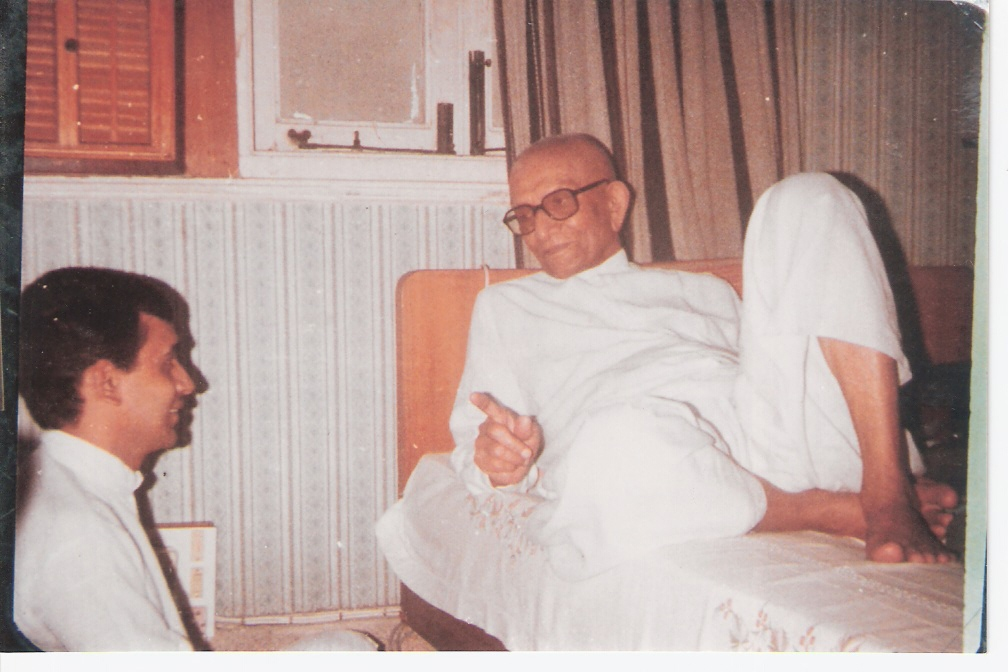
With Former Prime Minister of India Morarji Desai in 1984

- Member, Senate, Gandhigram Rural Institute Deemed University, Tamil Nadu, India, between 1994 and 1997
- Life Fellow, (United Writers’ Association), Chennai, Tamil Nadu, India since 1997
- Consultant to UNUP, CR., CA. for Gandhian Studies 2000
- Founder and Secretary General, World Peace Movement Trust since 2001
- Member, Gandhi-Information-Zentrum, Berlin, Germany since 2001
- Life Member, International Film & Television Research Centre, Noida, India since 2006
- Honorary Advisor, Peace Education Academy of Nepal, Kathmandu, Nepal since 2006
- Member, Global Initiative to End All Corporal Punishment of Children, London, UK since 2006
- Honorary Advisor, Institute For Inspiration & Self Development, Kolkata, India since 2006
- Member, Advisory Board, Media For Freedom, USA since 2007
- Member, Indian Language Newspapers Association (ILNA), India since 2009
- Member, Asia-Pacific Peace Research Association, since 2009
- Member, Action Asia, since 2009
- Patron, Stallion College for Engineering and Technology, Chhutmalpur, Saharanpur, India since 2010
- Member, Gandhi Serve Foundation, Germany since 2010
- Member, National Executive, Indian Language Newspapers Association (ILNA), India, between 2010 and 2012
- Patron, Ruminations –a bi-annual international journal for analysis and research in humanities and social sciences ISSN 2229-6751, India since 2010
- Member, Executive Council, Uttarakhand Sanskrit University, Haridwar (Uttarakhand), India, between 2011 and 2013
- Patron, The EDUQUEST –a bi-annually international-refereed journal in Education ISSN 2277-3614, JKC, Purulia, West Bengal, India since 2012
- Member, Advisory Board to Techno LEARN –a bi-annually international journal of educational technology ISSN 2231-4105, New Delhi, India since 2012
- Patron, LM Institute of Technology and Management, Lucknow, India since 2012
- Member Academic Council and the Coordinator for international affairs, Shridhar University (Rajasthan), India, between 2012 and 2017
- Founder Director, Institute of Indology and Oriental Studies, Shridhar University (Rajasthan), India since 2012
- Coordinator for international relations for the universities and institutions of higher studies and research under the Baise-Chumphon and Krabi Sister's Cities Projects, between 2012 and 2017
- The Ombudsman, Swami Vivekananda Subharati University, Meerut (UP), India and 17 other institutions along, since 2013
- Chairman of the Committee for Classification of Affiliated Colleges with the Uttrakhand Sanskrit University, Haridwar, 2013
- Patron, International Centre of Nonviolence (ICON), Sydney, Australia since 2013
- Patron, The Ashram Gandhi Puri, Bali, Indonesia since 2014
- Patron, Adi Shankara Vedanta Pratishthanam, Bhubaneswar, Odisha, India since 2015
- Advisor/Council Head and Convener, Gandhi Peace Foundation, Kathmandu, Nepal since 2018
- Member Advisory Board of Acid Survivors & Women Welfare Foundation –ASWWF, India since 2019

== Awards ==
- 1993: Meerut Ratna
- 1998: Nirala Smriti Samman
- 2001: Padma Shri for Literature and Education
- 2003: Shan-I-Kaum
- 2004: Shantidoot
- 2005: Ambassador for Peace
- 2006: Sardar Patel National Award
- 2008: Master of Wisdom
- 2010: Peace Messenger
- 2010: Peace Envoy
- 2012: Soham Smarkam Award of Bharatiya Vidya Bhavan
- 2012: The Buddha Ratna
- 2013: Uttar Pradesh Ratna
- 2013: D. LIT. (Honoris Causa)
- 2013: Samaj Ratna
- 2014: The Gandhi Ratna
- 2014: Shiksha Ratna
- 2014: Gandhi Shiksha Ratna
- 2015: Sardar Patel Ratna
- 2015: SREIT Lifetime Achievement Award
- 2016: Vidyavachaspati
- 2017: Shivkumar Shastri Smriti Samman along with Hindi Bhasha Bhushan
- 2017: Madyanirodhan Samman –the highest honour of Kerala Hindi Sahitya Academy
- 2018: Gandhi Peace Honour
- 2018: Bharat Gaurav * 2020: Buddhist Humanitarian Award. * 2020: Gandhi Nobel Peace Award. * 2021: Country's Pride
