= Deaths in December 2012 =

The following is a list of notable deaths in December 2012.

Entries for each day are listed alphabetically by surname. A typical entry lists information in the following sequence:

- Name, age, country of citizenship and reason for notability, established cause of death, reference.

== December 2012 ==
=== 1 ===
- Ahmed Taib El Alj, 84, Moroccan writer.
- Raymond Ausloos, 82, Belgian football player.
- Jovan Belcher, 25, American football player (Kansas City Chiefs), suicide by gunshot.
- José Bénazéraf, 90, French film director and producer.
- Arthur Chaskalson, 81, South African judge, Chief Justice (2001–2005), leukaemia.
- John Crigler, 76, American basketball player (University of Kentucky).
- Steve Fox, 54, English footballer, cancer.
- Chuck Gavin, 78, American football player.
- Dee Harvey, 47, American R&B singer.
- Rick Majerus, 64, American college basketball coach (University of Utah, Saint Louis University), heart failure.
- Ezroy Millwood, 70, Jamaican transport businessman.
- Gerard Parker, 76, American Cherokee tribal leader, Principal Chief of the Eastern Band of Cherokee Indians (1995).
- Rubén Pellanda, 65, Argentine politician.
- Ed Price, 94, American politician, member of the Florida Senate (1958–1966).
- Ray Rosso, 96, Italian-born American football coach, natural causes.
- Marcia Russell, 72, New Zealand journalist and news presenter.
- Edouard Saouma, 86, Lebanese civil servant, Director General of the Food and Agriculture Organization (1976–1993).
- Bhim Bahadur Tamang, 78, Nepali politician, stroke.
- Phil Taylor, 95, English footballer and coach (Liverpool).
- Vidal Vega, 48, Paraguayan peasant leader, shooting.
- Yoshinori Watanabe, 71, Japanese yakuza, fifth godfather of the Yamaguchi-gumi.
- Reinhold Weege, 62, American television writer and producer (Barney Miller, Night Court, Park Place).
- James R. Whelan, 79, American publisher (The Washington Times), multiple organ failure.

=== 2 ===
- Ron Auchettl, 66, Australian footballer.
- Christopher Collett, 81, British accountant, lord mayor of London.
- Michael Crawford, 92, English cricketer.
- Gitte Dæhlin, 56, Norwegian sculptor.
- Preeti Ganguly, 59, Indian actress, cardiac arrest.
- Michael A. Gorman, 62, American politician, member of the North Carolina House of Representatives (2003–2005), POEMS syndrome.
- Tom Hendry, 83, Canadian playwright, founder of Manitoba Theatre Centre.
- Hiroshi Kato, 77, Japanese aikido master.
- Israel Keyes, 34, American alleged serial killer, suicide by hanging and lacerations.
- Ehsan Naraghi, 86, Iranian sociologist and writer, Director of UNESCO's Youth Division (1980–1996), long illness.
- Sylvester Odhiambo, Kenyan football coach (Muhoroni Youth F.C.).
- Décio Pignatari, 85, Brazilian poet, essayist and translator, respiratory failure.
- Azumir Veríssimo, 77, Brazilian footballer.
- Szymon, 23, Australian musician, suicide.

=== 3 ===
- Jules Mikhael Al-Jamil, 74, Iraqi-born Lebanese Syrian Catholic hierarch, Archbishop-Procurator in Rome (since 1986).
- Leo Rajendram Antony, 85, Sri Lankan Roman Catholic prelate, Bishop of Trincomalee-Batticaloa (1974–1983).
- Amir Mahmud Anvar, 67, Iranian literary academic and poet.
- Tommy Berggren, 62, Swedish footballer.
- Ivan Boboshko, 83, Soviet football player and coach.
- Georgy Borisenko, 90, Soviet correspondence chess grandmaster and chess theoretician.
- Kuntal Chandra, 28, Bangladeshi cricketer, strangulation.
- Bill Donckers, 61, American football player, lymphoma.
- Christopher Erhardt, 53, American video game producer and academic.
- Peter Johnson Sr., 91, American trial lawyer and political power broker, pulmonary fibrosis.
- Fyodor Khitruk, 95, Russian animator and animation director (The Story of a Crime).
- Mohamed Mahroof, 62, Sri Lankan politician, MP for Colombo (2000–2010).
- Diego Mendieta, 32, Paraguayan footballer, viral infection.
- Carlomagno Meneses, 85, Peruvian Olympic boxer.
- Eileen Moran, 60, American visual effects producer (The Lord of the Rings, Avatar, King Kong), cancer.
- King G. Porter, 91, American politician, member of the Tennessee State Senate.
- Sir Geoffrey Shakerley, 80, British photographer.
- Janet Shaw, 46, Australian Paralympic bronze medal-winning (2004) cyclist and author, cancer.
- Jeroen Willems, 50, Dutch actor and singer, cardiac arrest.

=== 4 ===
- Alfredo Abon Lee, 85, Cuban military officer.
- Narmada Akka, Indian communist, shot.
- Grady Allen, 66, American football player (Atlanta Falcons), cardiac arrest.
- José Alves da Costa, 73, Brazilian Roman Catholic prelate, Bishop of Corumbá (1991–1999).
- Vasily Belov, 80, Russian writer, poet and dramatist.
- Philippe Bena, 60, French Olympic fencer.
- Jean Bollack, 89, French philosopher, philologist and literary critic.
- Jack Brooks, 89, American politician, member of US House of Representatives (1953–1995) and Texas House of Representatives (1949–1953).
- Miguel Calero, 41, Colombian footballer, cerebral thrombosis.
- Rozina Cambos, 60, Israeli actress (The Human Resources Manager), leukemia.
- James B. Cardwell, 90, American bureaucrat, complications of a broken hip.
- Besse Cooper, 116, American supercentenarian, world's oldest person.
- Tony Deane-Drummond, 95, British army major general.
- Massimo Giustetti, 86, Italian Roman Catholic prelate, Bishop of Pinerolo (1974–1975), Mondovi (1975–1986) and Biella (1986–2001).
- Jonathan Harvey, 73, English composer, motor neurone disease.
- Helen Johnson Houghton, 102, British racehorse trainer.
- Eamon Kelly, 65, Irish criminal, shot.
- Peter Kiesewetter, 67, German modern classical composer.
- Miroslav Klůc, 90, Czech Olympic ice hockey (1956) forward and coach, member of Czech Ice Hockey Hall of Fame, stroke.
- Larry Lawrence, 63, American football player (Oakland Raiders, Tampa Bay Buccaneers, Edmonton Eskimos), edema.
- Paul Marcotte, 84, American politician, member of the Kentucky House of Representatives (2005–2007).
- Branislav Milinković, 52, Serbian diplomat, ambassador to NATO and Austria, suicide by jumping.
- Robert Monclar, 82, French Olympic basketball player.
- Hilmar Moore, 92, American politician, longest-serving mayor in the United States, complications of a fall.
- Tony Sweeney, 81, Irish sports writer and historian, heart attack.
- Michael Till, 77, British Anglican priest, Dean of Winchester (1996–2005).
- Ken Trickey, 79, American basketball coach (Oral Roberts University).
- Gerrit van Dijk, 73, Dutch animator, long illness.
- John Ward, 64, American football player (Minnesota Vikings), cancer.

=== 5 ===
- Allah Bachayo Khoso, 77, Pakistani artist and Alghoza player.
- Sammy Arena, 81, American singer, multiple organ failure.
- Petrine Archer-Straw, 55, British art historian, sickle-cell disease.
- Erwin Bischofberger, 76, Swedish Jesuit and medical practitioner.
- Dave Brubeck, 91, American jazz pianist ("Take Five") and composer ("Blue Rondo à la Turk"), heart failure.
- MC Buffalo, 41, Croatian rapper, stroke.
- Carlos Francisco Chang Marín, 90, Panamanian painter, musician, journalist, and writer.
- Evgeny Chubarov, 77, Russian painter, sculptor, and graphic artist.
- Chen Wencong, 42, Singaporean actor, writer and producer, pneumonia.
- Eduardo J. Corso, 92, Uruguayan journalist and lawyer.
- Wilhelmus Demarteau, 95, Dutch-born Indonesian Roman Catholic prelate, Bishop of Banjarmasin (1954–1983).
- Enebeli Elebuwa, 66, Nigerian actor, stroke.
- Peter Feltus, 70, American philatelist.
- Francesco Fonti, 64, Italian criminal.
- Kazbek Gekkiyev, 28, Russian journalist, shooting.
- Frigyes Hollósi, 71, Hungarian actor.
- Ignatius IV of Antioch, 92, Syrian Orthodox patriarch of the Greek Orthodox Church of Antioch (since 1979), stroke.
- Nakamura Kanzaburō XVIII, 57, Japanese kabuki star, acute respiratory distress syndrome.
- Dame Elisabeth Murdoch, 103, Australian philanthropist, widow of Sir Keith Murdoch, mother of Rupert Murdoch.
- Yves Niaré, 35, French Olympic (2008) shot putter, traffic collision.
- Oscar Niemeyer, 104, Brazilian architect, respiratory infection.
- Eileen Pollock, 86, American television writer and producer (Dynasty, The Colbys).
- Kaisa Sere, 58, Finnish computer scientist.
- Doug Smith, 75, Scottish footballer and administrator (Dundee United).
- Felix Weinberg, 84, Czech-born British physicist.

=== 6 ===
- Miguel Abia Biteo Boricó, 51, Equatorial Guinean politician, Prime Minister (2004–2006), heart attack.
- Mike Boyette, 71, American professional wrestler, heart disease.
- Jan Carew, 92, Guyanese writer and academic.
- Ed Cassidy, 89, American musician (Spirit), cancer.
- Liz Chadwick, 69, English golfer.
- Eta Cohen, 96, English violin teacher and author.
- Arnold C. Cooper, 79, American academic.
- Bim Diederich, 90, Luxembourgish road bicycle racer.
- David Favrholdt, 81, Danish philosopher.
- Keitani Graham, 32, Micronesian Olympic (2012) Greco-Roman wrestler, heart attack.
- Alice Harden, 64, American politician, Mississippi State Senator (since 1988).
- Karine Kazinian, 57, Armenian diplomat, Ambassador to the United Kingdom (since 2011), complications during surgery.
- Jeffrey Koo Sr., 79, Taiwanese businessman and billionaire, chairman for Chinatrust Financial Holding Company.
- Huw Lloyd-Langton, 61, British guitarist (Hawkwind, Widowmaker), throat cancer.
- Reginald Norby, 78, Norwegian diplomat, Ambassador to France (1994–1998).
- O-Six, 6, Yellowstone National Park gray wolf, shot.
- Pulpit, 18, American Thoroughbred racehorse, winner of the 1997 Fountain of Youth Stakes and Blue Grass Stakes.
- Giovanni Sostero, 48, Italian astronomer, heart attack.
- Pedro Vaz, 49, Uruguayan diplomat and lawyer, Minister of Foreign Affairs (2009–2010), Ambassador to Chile (since 2010), heart attack.

=== 7 ===
- Abu-Zaid al Kuwaiti, 46, Kuwaiti al-Qaeda leader, drone strike.
- Duggan Anderson, 88, Australian football player (Swan Districts Football Club).
- Olga Beaver, 70, Czech-American mathematician.
- Marie Bennigsen-Broxup, 68, British orientalist.
- Mikelis Brizga, 101, Australian businessman.
- P. J. Carey, 59, American baseball coach (Colorado Rockies).
- Chen Wen-yu, 88, Taiwanese horticulturist.
- Thomas Cornell, 75, American artist and professor, cancer.
- Armando Costa, 63, Canadian soccer coach and player.
- Gilbert Durand, 91, French academic.
- Ernest England, 85, Australian cricketer.
- Ammar El Sherei, 64, Egyptian musical composer and performer, heart ailment.
- Denis Houf, 80, Belgian footballer (Standard Liège).
- William F. House, 89, American physician, developer of the cochlear implant, cancer.
- Irene Hughes, 92, American psychic.
- Nikola Ilić, 27, Serbian basketball player, cancer.
- Armand Van De Kerkhove, 97, Belgian footballer
- Roelof Kruisinga, 90, Dutch politician, Minister of Defence (1977–1978).
- Art Larsen, 87, American tennis player.
- Jeni Le Gon, 96, American dancer and actress (Amos 'n' Andy).
- Rusty Mills, 49, American animator (Animaniacs, Pinky and the Brain, The Replacements), colon cancer.
- Ralph Parr, 88, American fighter pilot, Korean War flying ace.
- Marty Reisman, 82, American table tennis player, complications of heart and lung ailments.
- Saul Steinberg, 73, American businessman and corporate raider.
- Govindasamy Suppiah, 83, Singaporean football referee, diabetes.
- Joseph R. Weisberger, 92, American judge, Chief Justice of Rhode Island Supreme Court (1993–2001).

=== 8 ===
- Hermelindo Alberti, 87, Argentine sprinter.
- Barry Altman, 63, American businessman, cancer.
- Jerry Brown, 25, American football player (Dallas Cowboys), traffic collision.
- Mary Griggs Burke, 96, American art collector, largest private collector of Japanese art outside Japan.
- Arnold Dean, 82, American radio sports host and personality.
- Vernice Ferguson, 84, American nurse and healthcare executive.
- John Gowans, 78, British religious leader and musician, General of The Salvation Army (1999–2002).
- Jagannathan, 74, Indian actor.
- Yvonne Kennedy, 67, American politician, member of the Alabama House of Representatives (since 1979).
- Johnny Lira, 61, American lightweight boxer, liver disease.
- Ambrose Madtha, 57, Indian Roman Catholic prelate, Titular Archbishop of Naissus, Apostolic Nuncio to Côte d'Ivoire (since 2008), traffic collision.
- Charles Martin, 81, American politician, member of the Alabama House of Representatives and Alabama Senate.
- Khan Sarwar Murshid, 88, Bangladeshi educationist and intellectual, complications from stroke.
- Walter Newman, 91, American civic leader and army veteran.
- Bill Prest, 86, Australian politician, Queensland MLA for Port Curtis (1976–1992).
- Hal Schaefer, 87, American jazz musician and vocal coach (Marilyn Monroe) involved in the Wrong-Door Raid.
- Isaiah Shavitt, 87, Polish–born American theoretical chemist.
- Mark Strizic, 84, Australian photographer.

=== 9 ===
- Barbara Alby, 66, American politician, member of the California State Assembly (1993–1998).
- Håkon E. Andersen, 87, Norwegian bishop.
- Mathews Barnabas, 88, Indian Metropolitan of Malankara Orthodox Syrian Church.
- Michael Bürsch, 70, German politician.
- Ailsa Craig, 95, Australian journalist.
- Anna Czóbel, 94, Hungarian cinematographer.
- Biswajit Das, 24, Bangladeshi tailor, murdered.
- Jeanne Gervais, 90, Ivorian politician.
- Anat Gov, 58, Israeli playwright and screenwriter, colorectal cancer.
- Hiromori Kawashima, 90, Japanese sports administrator.
- Ivan Ljavinec, 89, Ukrainian-born Czech Byzantine Catholic hierarch, Apostolic Exarch in the Czech Republic (1996–2003).
- Sir Patrick Moore, 89, British astronomer and broadcaster (The Sky at Night), sepsis.
- Alex Moulton, 92, British engineer and inventor (Moulton Bicycle).
- Béla Nagy Abodi, 94, Hungarian painter.
- André Nelis, 77, Belgian Olympic silver (1956) and bronze (1960) medal-winning sailor, cancer.
- Ataa Oko, abt. 93, Ghanaian fantasy coffin artist.
- Jenni Rivera, 43, American-born Mexican banda and norteño singer, plane crash.
- Charles Rosen, 85, American pianist and author, cancer.
- Riccardo Schicchi, 59, Italian pornographer, chronic kidney disease caused by type 2 diabetes.
- Norman Joseph Woodland, 91, American inventor, co-creator of the bar code.

=== 10 ===
- Iajuddin Ahmed, 81, Bangladeshi politician, President (2002–2009), heart and kidney disease.
- Vladimir Bakulin, 73, Kazakhstani Olympic silver medal-winning (1968) wrestler.
- Ashwini Bhatt, 76, Indian novelist.
- Cliff Brown, 60, American football player (Notre Dame).
- Antonio Cubillo, 82, Spanish politician, founder of Canary Islands Independence Movement.
- Lisa Della Casa, 93, Swiss soprano.
- Marla English, 77, American actress.
- Ralph Frese, 86, American canoe maker and conservationist.
- Ed Grady, 89, American actor (The Notebook, Dawson's Creek).
- Albert O. Hirschman, 97, German-born American economist.
- Hungargunn Bear It'n Mind, 9, Hungarian Vizsla, the Best in Show at Crufts in 2010.
- Harry Iauko, Vanuatuan politician, MP for Tanna (2008–2012), complications of pneumonia.
- Ibn Bey, 28, British-bred Thoroughbred racehorse and sire.
- Jacques Jullien, 83, French Roman Catholic prelate, Bishop of Beauvais (1978–1984), and Archbishop of Rennes (1985–1998).
- Patricia Kennedy, 96, Australian stage, film, and television actress (My Brilliant Career, Return to Eden).
- Ciarán Maher, 50, Irish Gaelic football player.
- Roy Miles, 77, British art dealer.
- Bob Munden, 70, American entertainer, heart failure.
- Shoichi Ozawa, 83, Japanese actor and folk art researcher.
- Paul Rauch, 82, American television producer (Another World, One Life to Live, Santa Barbara), complications of blood clots.
- Tommy Roberts, 70, British fashion designer.
- John Small, 66, American football player (Atlanta Falcons, Detroit Lions).
- Felix Stehling, 87, American restaurateur, co-founder of Taco Cabana, dementia.
- Erwin Tomash, 91, American businessman (Dataproducts), Alzheimer's disease.
- Birdsall S. Viault, 80, American academic.
- Reginald James Wallace, 93, British civil servant, last Governor of the Gilbert Islands (1978–1979).

=== 11 ===
- Angélica M. Arambarri, 67, Argentine botanist and mycologist.
- Emilia Pisani Belserene, 89, American astronomer.
- Toni Blankenheim, 90, German opera singer.
- Lou Castagnola, 76, American athlete.
- Vincent J Coates, 87, American engineer.
- Gennadiy Dulnev, 85, Russian academic.
- Semiha Es, 100, Turkish photographer.
- Antonie Hegerlíková, 89, Czech actress, Thalia Award winner (2004).
- William B. Hopkins, 90, American politician, member of Virginia Senate (1960–1980), majority leader (1976–1980).
- Pedro Reginaldo Lira, 97, Argentinian Roman Catholic prelate, Bishop of San Francisco in Argentina (1961–1965), and Auxiliary Bishop of Salta (1967–1978).
- B. B. Nimbalkar, 92, Indian cricketer.
- Dindi Gowa Nyasulu, 68, Malawian politician, leader of AFORD, brain tumor.
- Manuel Pardo, 56, American serial killer, execution by lethal injection.
- Gérard Rasquin, 85, Luxembourgish Olympic sprinter.
- Ravi Shankar, 92, Indian musician, complications from heart surgery.
- Walter Francis Sullivan, 84, American Roman Catholic prelate, Bishop of Richmond (1974–2003), liver cancer.
- Galina Vishnevskaya, 86, Russian soprano opera singer and recitalist.
- Colleen Walker, 56, American golfer, won du Maurier Classic (1997), breast cancer.
- Mendel Weinbach, 79, Polish-born Israeli rabbi.

=== 12 ===
- Joe Allbritton, 87, American businessman, broadcaster and publisher.
- Fazlul Haque Amini, 67, Bangladeshi Muslim scholar.
- W. Rex Black, 92, American politician, member of the Utah Senate (1973–1997).
- Cynthia Bolbach, 64, American lawyer, cancer.
- Ray Briem, 82, American radio host (KABC), cancer.
- Eddie "Guitar" Burns, 84, American Detroit blues musician, heart failure.
- Manas Chakraborty, 70, Indian singer.
- Ron Cooper, 80, British bicycle frame maker.
- Alfred Delcourt, 83, Belgian football referee.
- Richard Eyre, 83, British Anglican priest, Dean of Exeter (1981–1996).
- Chris Fokma, 85, Dutch sculptor and ceramist.
- Laurie Gallagher, 88, Australian footballer.
- Else Marie Jakobsen, 85, Norwegian textile artist.
- Walt Kirk, 88, American basketball player (Fort Wayne Pistons, Milwaukee Hawks).
- Don Medford, 95, American television director (Baretta, Dynasty, The F.B.I., The Fugitive).
- N. M. Mohan, 63, Indian comic book writer and editor, heart attack.
- Thomas Naylor, 76, American economist.
- Uri Possen, 70, American economist.
- Manju Bharat Ram, 66, Indian educationalist, cancer.
- Augustin Sagna, 92, Senegalese Roman Catholic prelate, Bishop of Ziguinchor (1966–1995).
- Nityanand Swami, 85, Indian politician, Chief Minister of Uttarakhand (2000–2001).
- David Tait, 25, English rugby player, fall from building.

=== 13 ===
- Willie Ackerman, 73, American drummer (Willie Nelson, Loretta Lynn, Louis Armstrong).
- Andreu Alfaro, 83, Spanish sculptor.
- Donnie Andrews, 58, American criminal, inspiration for Omar Little on The Wire, complications of heart surgery.
- Jaco de Bakker, 73, Dutch theoretical computer scientist.
- Balthazar Bigirimana, 54–55, Burundian politician and diplomat.
- Ian Black, 88, Scottish footballer.
- Jan Blaha, 74, Czech Roman Catholic prelate, Bishop (1967–2012).
- John Bradley, 87, American racer.
- Kumkum Chatterjee, 54, Indian American historian.
- William C. Coleman Jr., 87, American politician.
- Alan Colquhoun, 91, English architect, historian, critic and teacher.
- Gil Friesen, 75, American music and film executive, President of A&M Records (1965–1990), leukemia.
- Jack Hanlon, 96, American child actor (Our Gang, The Shakedown, The General).
- Maurice Herzog, 93, French climber and politician, Minister of Youth and Sport (1958–1963).
- Natalya Kustinskaya, 74, Russian actress (Three Plus Two, Ivan Vasilievich Changes Profession), complications from pneumonia.
- Moshe Lazar, 84, American academic.
- Newton Edward Miller, 93, American politician, member of the New Jersey House of Representatives (1981–1989).
- Midori Miura, 64, Japanese translator of Russian, cancer.
- T. Shanmugham, 92, Indian footballer and coach, respiratory ailment.
- Rob Talbot, 89, New Zealand politician, MP for Ashburton (1966–1969, 1978–1987) and South Canterbury (1969–1978).
- Abdesslam Yassine, 84, Moroccan political figure, complications of influenza.

=== 14 ===
- Joseph Abiodun Adetiloye, 82, Nigerian Anglican prelate, Primate of the Church of Nigeria (1986–1999).
- Leon Abrams, 89, British surgeon.
- Claude Abravanel, 88, Swiss pianist and composer.
- Richard Baum, 72, American China watcher.
- Avrelija Cencič, 48, Slovenian university professor.
- Alida Chelli, 69, Italian actress, cancer.
- Ertuğ Ergin, 42, Turkish singer.
- John Graham, 89, British army major general.
- Edward Jones, 62, American politician, North Carolina State Senator (since 2007), pancreatic cancer.
- Kenneth Kendall, 88, British television broadcaster (BBC News, Treasure Hunt), complications of a stroke.
- Klaus Köste, 69, German Olympic champion (1972) gymnast, heart failure.
- Adam Lanza, 20, perpetrator of the Sandy Hook Elementary School shooting, suicide.
- Hazel McIsaac, 79, Canadian politician, Newfoundland and Labrador House of Assembly member for St. George's (1975–1982), Alzheimer's disease.
- Jitka Senecká, 72, Czech Olympic volleyball player.
- Marion Stokes, 83, American television producer and civil rights activist.
- Shōmei Tōmatsu, 82, Japanese photographer.
- Victoria Leigh Soto, 27, American elementary school teacher, alongside other victims of the Sandy Hook Elementary School shooting.

=== 15 ===
- Mohammad Amin, 84, Indian historian.
- Yury Anisimov, 74, Soviet Olympic sailor.
- Owoye Andrew Azazi, 60, Nigerian general, National Security Adviser (2010–2012), helicopter crash.
- Jamala al-Baidhani, 35, Yemeni activist, respiratory disease.
- Dick Hafer, 85, American jazz saxophonist.
- Bob Johnston, 83, Australian rules footballer (Melbourne).
- C. Louis Kincannon, 72, American bureaucrat, Director of the U.S. Census Bureau (2002–2008), cancer.
- Vincent Lafko, 67, Slovak Olympic silver medallist handball player (1972).
- Bob Odell, 90, American football player, kidney disease.
- Páidí Ó Sé, 57, Irish Gaelic football player and manager, suspected heart attack.
- Bobby Jack Oliver, 76, American football player.
- Ralph Pampena, 78, American police officer, Pittsburgh Police Chief (1987–1990), cancer.
- Jeffrey Potter, 94, American author.
- John Anderson Strong, 97, Scottish physician and academic.
- Takeshi Urata, 65, Japanese astronomer.
- Patrick Yakowa, 64, Nigerian politician, Governor of Kaduna State (since 2010), helicopter crash.
- Olga Zubarry, 83, Argentine film actress.

=== 16 ===
- Charlesia Alexis, 78, Chagossian singer and activist.
- Axel Anderson, 83, German-born Puerto Rican actor.
- Robert W. Bazley, 87, American four-star general.
- James Walker Benét, 98, American journalist, veteran of the Abraham Lincoln Brigade, son of William Rose Benét.
- Petar Bozhilov, 49, Bulgarian canoer.
- Sheila Casey (née McKinley), 71, Scottish singer, cancer.
- John Chen Shi-zhong, 94, Chinese Roman Catholic prelate, Bishop of Suifu (since 1985).
- Peter Clarke, 77, British cartoonist.
- Doyle Conner, 83, American politician, member of Florida House (1950–1960), Speaker (1958–1960), Florida Commissioner of Agriculture (1961–1991).
- Febo Conti, 85, Italian television and radio presenter.
- Duaine Counsell, 92, American football and baseball coach.
- Robert Derleth, 90, American football player, complications of a stroke.
- Andrzej Dłużniewski, 73, Polish sculptor.
- George Duggan, 100, New Zealand Marist priest and writer.
- Elwood V. Jensen, 92, American medical researcher, pneumonia.
- Laurier LaPierre, 83, Canadian broadcaster and politician, Senator from Ontario (2001–2004).
- Iñaki Lejarreta, 29, Spanish Olympic (2008) mountain biker, traffic collision.
- Avraham Mor, 77, Israeli actor and voice actor, cancer.
- Adam Ndlovu, 42, Zimbabwean footballer, traffic collision.
- Enrique Oltuski, 82, Cuban politician and revolutionary, respiratory failure.
- Nikolai Parshin, 83, Russian football player and manager.
- Jim Patterson, 84, Scottish footballer.
- Brian Sampson, 71, Australian rules football player.
- Fan Vavřincová, 95, Czech author and screenwriter (Eva tropí hlouposti, Taková normální rodinka).
- Josh Weston, 39, American gay porn actor, AIDS-related causes.
- Jake Adam York, 40, American poet, stroke.

=== 17 ===
- Charlie Adam, 50, Scottish footballer, suicide.
- Richard Adams, 65, Filipino-born American gay rights activist, cancer.
- Tony Charlton, 83, Australian sports broadcaster, bowel cancer.
- Chinwe Chukwuogo-Roy, 60, Nigerian-born British artist, cancer.
- Wayne Ducheneaux, 76, American Native leader.
- Manfred Feist, 82, German politician and party functionary.
- Jack Frazer, 80, Canadian politician.
- James Gower, 90, American Catholic priest and peace activist, co-founder of the College of the Atlantic.
- Jesse Hill, 86, American civil rights leader and businessman.
- Daniel Inouye, 88, American politician, Senator from Hawaii (since 1963), President pro tempore (since 2010), Medal of Honor recipient, respiratory failure.
- Peter Kenen, 80, American academic, emphysema.
- Arnaldo Mesa, 45, Cuban Olympic silver medal-winning (1996) boxer, stroke.
- Frank Pastore, 55, American baseball player (Cincinnati Reds), injuries from a traffic collision.
- Midge Richardson, 82, American magazine editor (Seventeen), natural causes.
- Sir Colin Spedding, 87, British biologist and agricultural scientist.
- Carroll S. Walsh Jr., 91, American judge, New York Supreme Court (1978–1990), heart failure.

=== 18 ===
- Skippy Baxter, 93, American figure skater.
- Leman Çıdamlı, 80, Turkish actress, lung cancer.
- Gabrielle Clerk, 89, Canadian psychologist.
- Spencer Cox, 44, American HIV/AIDS activist, AIDS-related causes.
- Joseph T. Doyle, 81, American judge and politician, cancer.
- Sigmund Eisner, 92, American academic.
- Albert Elias, 41, American sports agent.
- Georgi Kaloyanchev, 87, Bulgarian actor (The Tied Up Balloon, Where Are You Going?).
- Koko, 7, Australian canine actor (Red Dog), heart disease.
- Ben Luján, 77, American politician, member of the New Mexico House of Representatives (since 1975), Speaker (since 2001), lung cancer.
- Frank Macchiarola, 71, American educator, New York City Schools Chancellor (1978–1983), liver cancer.
- Bessie Moody-Lawrence, 71, American politician, member of the South Carolina House of Representatives (1993–2007), brain cancer.
- Mustafa Ould Salek, 76, Mauritanian army officer and politician, Chairman of the Military Committee for National Recovery (1978–1979).
- Keith Reilly, 77, Canadian curler.
- Camil Samson, 77, Canadian politician, MNA for Rouyn-Noranda (1970–1981).
- George Showell, 78, English footballer, ruptured stomach aortic artery.
- Danny Steinmann, 70, American film director (Friday the 13th: A New Beginning, Savage Streets, The Unseen).
- Jim Whalen, 69, American football player (New England Patriots).
- Kevin Williams, 42, American football player.
- Sir Marcus Worsley, 5th Baronet, 87, English politician, MP for Keighley (1959–1964) and Chelsea (1966–1974).
- Muriel T. Yacavone, 92, American politician, member of the Connecticut House of Representatives (1970–1982).

=== 19 ===
- Bud Alper, 82, American sound engineer (Blade Runner, Rocky, The Crow).
- Inez Andrews, 83, American gospel singer (The Caravans), cancer.
- Mauricio García Araujo, 81, Venezuelan economist.
- Bob Armstrong, 64, Australian policeman, cancer.
- Sir Lawrie Barratt, 85, English businessman (Barratt Developments).
- Robert Bork, 85, American legal scholar, jurist, and 1987 Supreme Court nominee, heart disease.
- Ken Chaney, 73, Canadian-born American jazz pianist, natural causes.
- Alan Cowey, 77, British biochemist.
- Paul Crauchet, 92, French actor.
- Ian Crewes, 74, Australian footballer.
- Garniss Curtis, 93, American geophysicist.
- Colin Davis, 79, British racing driver, winner of 1964 Targa Florio.
- Les Devonshire, 86, English footballer.
- Pecker Dunne, 79, Irish musician.
- Krzysztof Etmanowicz, 53, Polish football manager.
- Daniel Gasman, 79, American historian.
- Konrad Hischier, 77, Swiss Olympic skier.
- Georges Jobé, 51, Belgian motocross rider, five-time FIM World Motocross Champion, leukemia.
- Sir Kan Yuet-keung, 99, Hong Kong banker, politician and lawyer.
- Douglas Leiterman, 85, Canadian producer and journalist (This Hour Has Seven Days).
- Amnon Lipkin-Shahak, 68, Israeli lieutenant general, Chief of Staff (1995–1998) and politician, Minister of Transportation and Tourism, cancer.
- Larry Morris, 79, American football player (Chicago Bears, Los Angeles Rams), after long illness.
- Keiji Nakazawa, 73, Japanese manga artist and writer (Barefoot Gen), lung cancer.
- George O'Donnell, 83, American baseball player (Pittsburgh Pirates).
- Virginia Starcher, 82, American politician, member of the West Virginia House of Delegates (1986–1990).
- Peter Struck, 69, German politician, member of the Bundestag (1980–2009), Minister of Defence (2002–2005), heart attack.
- Piet de Visser, 81, Dutch politician.

=== 20 ===
- George Almones, 50, American basketball player, heart failure.
- Mohammad Awad, 73, Jordanian footballer.
- Bill Bell, 100, British army officer and lawyer.
- Don Campbell, 87, Canadian ice hockey player.
- Daniel Cazés, 73, Mexican anthropologist.
- Stan Charlton, 83, English footballer (Leyton Orient, Arsenal).
- Leslie Claudius, 85, Indian Olympic champion (1948, 1952, 1956, 1960) field hockey player, cirrhosis of the liver.
- Richard Crandall, 64, American scientist, leukemia.
- Niall FitzGerald, 81, Irish football player.
- Robert Juniper, 83, Australian artist.
- Eagle Keys, 89, American-born Canadian CFL football player (Montreal Alouettes, Edmonton Eskimos) and coach (Saskatchewan Roughriders).
- Larry L. King, 83, American writer and playwright (Best Little Whorehouse in Texas), emphysema.
- Chick Maggioli, 90, American football player.
- Jimmy McCracklin, 91, American blues musician, diabetes and hypertension.
- Victor Merzhanov, 93, Russian classical pianist.
- Erich Peters, 92, Swedish Olympic gymnast.
- Albert Renaud, 92, Canadian ice hockey player.
- Thelma Reston, 75, Brazilian actress (Entranced Earth), breast cancer.
- Kamil Sönmez, 65, Turkish singer and actor, State Artist, cerebral hemorrhage.
- Dennis Stevens, 79, English footballer (Bolton Wanderers, Everton).
- Jerome Whitehead, 56, American basketball player, gastrointestinal hemorrhage.

=== 21 ===
- Sultan Ahmed, 74, Bangladeshi Navy admiral.
- Vivian Anderson, 91, American baseball player (Milwaukee Chicks).
- Boyd Bartley, 92, American baseball player (Brooklyn Dodgers).
- Jarl Borssén, 75, Swedish actor and comedian.
- Thomas Bryant, 79, South African cricketer.
- Margarita Costa Tenorio, 61, Spanish biologist.
- Curtis Crider, 82, American racing driver.
- Jishu Dasgupta, 53, Indian film and television producer, cardiac arrest.
- Lee Dorman, 70, American bass guitarist (Iron Butterfly, Captain Beyond), natural causes.
- David Lomon, 94, British military veteran, member of the International Brigade.
- Shane McEntee, 56, Irish politician, TD for Meath (2005–2007) & Meath East (since 2007); Minister of State at the Department of Agriculture, Food and the Marine (since 2011), suicide.
- Thomas W. McGee, 88, American politician, member of the Massachusetts House of Representatives (1963–1991) and Speaker (1975–1984).
- Lotoala Metia, Tuvaluan politician, Minister for Finance, after long illness.
- Seiso Moyo, 56, Zimbabwean politician, MP for Nketa, heart attack.
- Daphne Oxenford, 93, English television and radio actress (Listen with Mother, Coronation Street).
- Basil Robinson, 93, English-born Canadian cricketer.

=== 22 ===
- Peter Anker, 85, Norwegian art historian and critic.
- Bashir Ahmad Bilour, 69, Pakistani politician, bombing.
- Paul Borowski, 75, German Olympic silver medallist sailor (1972).
- Chuck Cherundolo, 96, American football player (Philadelphia Eagles, Pittsburgh Steelers), heart failure.
- Charles Cleveland, 61, American basketball player.
- Wattie Dick, 85, Scottish footballer (Accrington Stanley).
- Neil Doolan, 79, Australian football player.
- Ryan Freel, 36, American baseball player (Cincinnati Reds), suicide by gunshot.
- Emidio Greco, 74, Italian film director and screenwriter.
- Willy Blok Hanson, 98, Javanese-born Canadian dancer.
- Rip Hawk, 82, American professional wrestler.
- George Hazlett, 89, Scottish footballer.
- Gary Johnson, 74, American baseball player and manager.
- Květa Legátová, 93, Czech writer, novel filmed as Želary.
- Barbara Lett-Simmons, 85, American politician.
- Lim Keng Yaik, 73, Malaysian politician.
- Bill McBride, 67, American politician, Democratic Party nominee for Governor of Florida (2002), heart attack.
- Gerald Melling, 69, British-born New Zealand architect and writer.
- Cliff Osmond, 75, American actor (Irma la Douce, The Fortune Cookie, Kiss Me, Stupid), pancreatic cancer.
- Robert Pew, 89, American businessman and philanthropist, CEO and Chairman of Steelcase.
- Bolesław Proch, 60, Polish speedway rider, heart attack.
- Arthur Quinlan, 92, Irish journalist (The Irish Times).
- Robert Stevenson, 96, American musicologist.
- Arkady Vorobyov, 88, Soviet weightlifter, Olympic champion under-90 kg (1956, 1960).
- Marva Whitney, 68, American singer, complications of pneumonia.

=== 23 ===
- Jerry Araos, 68, Filipino sculptor, landscape artist, and activist.
- Eduardo Arnosi, 88, Argentine music critic and writer.
- Emilio Ciolli, 79, Italian cyclist.
- Abe Deutschendorf, 77, American politician, member of the Oklahoma House of Representatives (1994–2006).
- Dennis Greenland, 75, British soil scientist.
- Jean Harris, 89, American convicted murderer, killer of Scarsdale Diet doctor Herman Tarnower.
- Sylvia Hyman, 95, American ceramic artist.
- Eduardo Maiorino, 33, Brazilian MMA fighter, heart attack.
- Judy Nerat, 64, American politician, member of the Michigan House of Representatives (2009–2011), cancer.
- John Quimby, 77, American politician, member of the California State Assembly (1962–1974), complications of pneumonia.
- Mike Scaccia, 47, American heavy metal guitarist (Ministry, Rigor Mortis, Revolting Cocks), heart attack.
- Pedro Toledo, 69, Puerto Rican public official, Superintendent of the Puerto Rico Police Department (1993–2001, 2005–2009), cardiac arrest.
- Cristian Tudor, 30, Romanian footballer, cirrhosis.
- Klemens von Klemperer, 96, German-born American historian.
- Evelyn Ward, 89, American television actress, mother of David Cassidy, Alzheimer's disease.

=== 24 ===
- Anand Abhyankar, 48, Indian actor, traffic collision.
- Hugh Aitken, 88, American composer.
- Vilen Barskyi, 92, Ukrainian Soviet and German artist.
- Richard Rodney Bennett, 76, English film composer (Nicholas and Alexandra, Murder on the Orient Express, Four Weddings and a Funeral), BAFTA winner (1975).
- Capital Steez, 19, American rapper, suicide by jumping.
- Frank Christian, 60, American singer-songwriter.
- Ray Collins, 76, American singer (The Mothers of Invention), cardiac arrest.
- Brad Corbett, 75, American baseball owner (Texas Rangers, 1974–1980).
- Guy Dodson, 75, New Zealand biochemist.
- Charles Durning, 89, American actor (Evening Shade, Rescue Me, Dog Day Afternoon).
- Kimio Eto, 88, Japanese musician.
- Earl Evans, 57, American basketball player.
- Carolina Griño-Aquino, 89, Filipino judge, Supreme Court (1988–1993) and Court of Appeals.
- Douglas Hamilton, 65, British journalist, drowned.
- Lee Hartman, 82, American animator (The Mickey Mouse Club, Sleeping Beauty) and actor (Night of the Living Dead), complications from dementia.
- Jack Klugman, 90, American actor (Quincy, M.E., The Odd Couple, 12 Angry Men), Emmy winner (1964, 1971, 1973), prostate cancer.
- Alexander Leaf, 92, American physician and research scientist.
- Xavier Mabille, 79, Belgian historian and political scientist.
- Dennis O'Driscoll, 58, Irish poet.
- Elwyn Richardson, 87, New Zealand educator.

=== 25 ===
- Seeta bint Fahd Al Damir, 90, Saudi royal.
- Erico Aumentado, 72, Filipino politician, member of the House of Representatives for Bohol (since 2010), pneumonia.
- Jerzy Bereś, 82, Polish artist.
- Sir Neville Bosworth, 94, British politician, Lord Mayor of Birmingham (1969–1970).
- Augusto Bracca, 94, Venezuelan songwriter, respiratory arrest.
- Frank Calabrese Sr., 75, American mafia hitman (Family Secrets), suspected heart disease.
- Dona Canô, 105, Brazilian woman, the mother of Caetano Veloso and Maria Bethânia.
- Rachel Douglas-Home, 27th Baroness Dacre, 83, British aristocrat.
- Jane Dixon, 75, American Episcopal prelate, Suffragan Bishop of Washington (1992–2002).
- Peter Ebert, 94, German opera director.
- Şerafettin Elçi, 74, Kurdish lawyer, politician, government minister and statesman, cancer.
- Halfdan Hegtun, 94, Norwegian radio personality and politician.
- Edward Hughes, 92, American Roman Catholic prelate, Bishop of Metuchen (1987–1997), cancer.
- John Josephs, 88, English cricketer (Leicestershire).
- Henry Ford Kamel, 51, Ghanaian politician, MP for Buem (since 2004).
- Joe Krivak, 77, American football coach (University of Maryland), leukemia.
- Mahmoud Larnaout, 67, Tunisian actor.
- Rudolf Müller, 81, German Roman Catholic prelate, Bishop of Görlitz (1994–2006).
- Othmar Schneider, 84, Austrian Olympic champion (1952) Alpine skier and marksman.
- Turki bin Sultan Al Saud, 53, Saudi royal, Deputy Minister of Culture and Information (since 2011), heart attack.
- Lynn Watters, 96, Canadian Olympic sailor.
- Jože Zidar, 85, Slovenian Olympic ski jumper.

=== 26 ===
- Abdul Ghafoor Ahmed, 85, Pakistani politician and educator.
- Gerry Anderson, 83, British producer, writer and director (Thunderbirds, Captain Scarlet and the Mysterons), Alzheimer's disease.
- Fontella Bass, 72, American singer ("Rescue Me"), complications from a heart attack.
- Paul T. Bateman, 93, American number theorist.
- Elizabeth Brewster, 90, Canadian poet and academic.
- John Dwight Canaday, 67, American serial killer, natural causes.
- Chu Ting-shun, 84, Taiwanese folk musician and yueqin player.
- Les Garnider, 89, Australian footballer.
- Anton Geiser, 88, Yugoslav-born Nazi concentration camp guard.
- Fred Gerard, 88, French jazz trumpeter and composer
- E. Porter Hatcher Jr., 76, American politician, member of the Kentucky House of Representatives (1987–1999).
- Hugh Lambie, 95, Australian Olympic rower.
- Gerald McDermott, 71, American filmmaker and author.
- Jean Perrot, 92, French archaeologist.
- Irving Saraf, 80, Polish producer, editor and director (In the Shadow of the Stars, One Flew Over the Cuckoo's Nest), amyotrophic lateral sclerosis.
- Henri Strzelecki, 87, Polish-born British fashion designer, co-founder of Henri Lloyd.
- Ibrahim Tannous, 83, Lebanese military commander.
- Rebecca Tarbotton, 39, Canadian-born American environmental activist, director of Rainforest Action Network, drowning.

=== 27 ===
- Zuleika Alambert, 90, Brazilian writer, feminist, and politician.
- Peter Anderson, 62, New Zealand cricketer.
- Bernie Baxter, 83, Australian rules football player.
- Valentin Boreyko, 79, Russian Olympic champion (1960) rower.
- Harry Carey Jr., 91, American actor (Gremlins, Tombstone, The Searchers), natural causes.
- Lloyd Charmers, 74, Jamaican singer and record producer, heart attack.
- Mahmudul Karim Chowdhury, Bangladeshi politician.
- Beatriz da Costa, 38, German artist, cancer.
- Maurice Paul Delorme, 93, French Roman Catholic prelate, Auxiliary Bishop of Lyon (1975–1994).
- Beth Finch, 91, American politician, first female Mayor of Fayetteville, North Carolina (1975–1981).
- Hamid Ghodse, 74, Iranian-born British academic, expert in substance abuse and dependence, lung cancer.
- Sohrab Hossain, 90, Bangladeshi singer, exponent of Nazrul Sangeet.
- Ken Jones, 68, English footballer (Bradford Park Avenue, Southampton).
- Paul Khoarai, 79, Mosotho Roman Catholic prelate, Bishop of Leribe (1970–2009).
- Jorma Kortelainen, 80, Finnish Olympic silver medalist (1956) cross-country skier and rower, sepsis.
- Tingye Li, 81, Chinese-born American physicist.
- Edgar May, 83, Swiss-born American politician and Pulitzer prize-winning (1961) journalist, member of Vermont House of Representatives (1973–1983) and Senate (1983–1991), stroke.
- Benny McLaughlin, 84, American footballer.
- Jesco von Puttkamer, 79, German-born American aerospace engineer and NASA manager.
- Albert Riederer, 67, American judge and civic leader, Missouri Court of Appeals (1997–1999), cancer.
- Archie Roy, 88, Scottish astronomer and paranormal expert, pneumonia.
- Jim Sandoval, 54, American baseball historian.
- Norman Schwarzkopf Jr., 78, American general, Commander-in-Chief of United States Central Command (1988–1991), complications from pneumonia.
- Noriko Sengoku, 90, Japanese actress (Seven Samurai).
- Takashi Taniguchi, 65, Japanese voice actor (Bokurano, One Piece, Xenoblade Chronicles).
- Mlađa Veselinović, 97, Serbian actor.
- Salt Walther, 65, American racecar driver.
- Ivar Ytreland, 86, Norwegian politician.

=== 28 ===
- Nicholas Ambraseys, 83, Greek engineering seismologist.
- Fyodor Arkhipenko, 91, Soviet-Belarusian pilot.
- Bogdan Baltazar, 73, Romanian banker, press secretary for Prime Minister Petre Roman, cancer.
- Martin G. Barnes, 64, American politician, first African American mayor of Paterson, New Jersey (1997–2002).
- Richard Lee Beasley, 82, American politician, member of the South Carolina House of Representatives (1960–1966), father of David M. Beasley.
- Steve Bryles, 55, American politician, member of the Arkansas Senate (2001–2011), cancer.
- John Carol Case, 89, British baritone.
- Emilio Charles Jr., 56, Mexican professional wrestler, kidney failure.
- Jayne Cortez, 76, American poet and performance artist.
- Mark Crispin, 56, American computer programmer.
- John Diehl, 76, American football player.
- Václav Drobný, 32, Czech footballer (Aston Villa, national team), bobsleigh collision.
- Barrie Edgar, 93, English producer (Come Dancing, Gardeners' World), pneumonia.
- Jon Finch, 70, English actor (Frenzy, Kingdom of Heaven, Death on the Nile).
- Arnór Hannibalsson, 78, Icelandic philosopher and professor.
- Frank Henderson, 84, American politician and judge, member of the South Dakota Senate (1965–1966, 1969–1970) and Supreme Court of South Dakota (1979–1994).
- Tommy Keane, 44, Irish association football player.
- Leif Krantz, 80, Swedish television producer and film director.
- Dan Kraus, 89, American basketball player and FBI special agent, cancer.
- Claude-Anne Lopez, 92, American author and scholar, Alzheimer's disease.
- Lord Avie, 34, American thoroughbred racehorse, oldest living Eclipse Award winner (1980).
- Arman Manukyan, 81, Turkish economist and writer, heart disease.
- George Patterson, 92, Scottish missionary.
- Fred Rehm, 91, American basketball player.
- Emmanuel Scheffer, 88, German-born Israeli football coach, coached national team to only World Cup (1970).
- Burdette Solum, 85, American politician, member of the South Dakota House of Representatives (1991–1992, 1998–2004).
- Frankie Walsh, 76, Irish hurler (Waterford GAA).

=== 29 ===
- Hugh Adam, 87, Scottish businessperson.
- Aleksandra Akimova, 90, Russian pilot.
- Bob Astles, 88, British-born Ugandan government adviser of Milton Obote and Idi Amin.
- Mike Auldridge, 73, American bluegrass musician (The Seldom Scene), cancer.
- Kevin Betson, 83, Australian footballer.
- Henri Bortoft, 74, British philosopher.
- Chu Chang-kyun, 91, South Korean businessperson.
- Keith Crombie, 73, British music venue owner and promoter.
- Tony Greig, 66, South African cricketer, England captain (1975–1977) and Australian Nine Network television commentator, heart attack.
- Roland Griffiths-Marsh, 89, Australian soldier.
- Patience Latting, 94, American politician, first female Mayor of Oklahoma City (1971–1983).
- Edward Meneeley, 85, American artist.
- Ian Norton, 75, English cricketer.
- Ben Overton, 86, American judge, Supreme Court of Florida (1974–1999), complications following heart surgery.
- William Rees-Mogg, Baron Rees-Mogg, 84, British journalist and life peer, Editor of The Times (1967–1981), oesophageal cancer.
- Salvador Reyes Monteón, 76, Mexican footballer (C.D. Guadalajara, national team).
- Paulo Rocha, 77, Portuguese film director.
- Bruce Stark, 79, American cartoonist (New York Daily News), emphysema.
- Ruth Ann Steinhagen, 83, American stalker, shot Eddie Waitkus, inspiration for The Natural, fall.
- Ignacy Tokarczuk, 94, Polish Roman Catholic prelate, Archbishop of Przemyśl (1965–1993).
- Jean Topart, 90, French actor (Fantastic Planet).
- Jeanne Vertefeuille, 80, American CIA official.

=== 30 ===
- Muhammad Amir Bijligar, 85, Pakistani religious leader.
- Gerry Brady, 87, Irish sports shooter.
- Catarina Castor, 32, Guatemalan politician, first Ixil woman elected to Congress, plane crash.
- Philip Coppens, 41, American author, cancer.
- Dennis Ferguson, 64, Australian convicted child sex offender.
- Beate Sirota Gordon, 89, Austrian-born American performing arts producer and women's rights advocate, drafted the Constitution of Japan.
- Mike Hopkins, 53, New Zealand sound editor (The Lord of the Rings, Transformers, King Kong), drowned.
- Arend Langenberg, 63, Dutch voice-over and radio presenter, rectal cancer.
- Rita Levi-Montalcini, 103, Italian neurologist and senator for life, Nobel laureate in Physiology or Medicine (1986), natural causes.
- Göran Nilsson, 66, Swedish cinematographer.
- Gloria Pall, 85, American actress, heart failure.
- Sir Irvine Patnick, 83, British politician, MP for Sheffield Hallam (1987–1997), heart disease.
- Sonam Topgyal, 71, Tibetan politician, Kalön Tripa (Prime Minister) of the Central Tibetan Administration (1997–2001), stomach cancer.
- Andreu Vivó, 34, Spanish artistic gymnast, competed at the 2000 Summer Olympics, heart attack while mountain climbing.
- Carl Woese, 84, American biologist, winner of Leeuwenhoek Medal (1992), National Medal of Science (2000), complications from pancreatic cancer.

=== 31 ===
- Elfriede Abbe, 93, American sculptor, wood engraver and botanical illustrator.
- Larry Bowie, 73, American football player (Minnesota Vikings).
- Moisès Broggi, 104, Spanish physician and pacifist.
- Carmen Calleja, 63, Spanish politician.
- Sergio de Castro, 90, French-Argentinian artist.
- Béla Csécsei, 60, Hungarian politician, Mayor of Józsefváros (1993–2009).
- Susana Dalmás, 64, Uruguayan politician, Senator (2010–2012), heart attack.
- Jim Davenport, 54, American journalist (Associated Press), cancer.
- Walter Hekster, 75, Dutch composer, clarinetist and conductor.
- Konstantin Kobets, 73, Russian Soviet-era military commander.
- Alasdair Liddell, 63, British health executive.
- Velta Līne, 89, Latvian actress, Stalin Prize (1948, 1951), People's Artist (1973).
- Annapurna Maharana, 95, Indian revolutionary figure and women's rights activist.
- Jovette Marchessault, 74, Canadian writer and artist.
- Tarak Mekki, 54, Tunisian politician, heart attack.
- Alan Reece, 85, British engineer and businessman.
- James B. Reuter, 96, American-born Filipino Roman Catholic priest and mass media advocate, complications from a stroke.
- Jean-Henri Roger, 63, French film director.
- Günter Rössler, 86, German photographer.
- Yang Teng-kuei, 74, Taiwanese film producer (Fong Sai-yuk, A City of Sadness), stroke.
