= Odhiambo =

Odhiambo is a surname. Notable people with the surname include:

- Agnes Odhiambo (accountant), Kenyan accountant and civil servant
- Agnes Odhiambo (activist), Kenyan human rights activist who works at Human Rights Watch
- Alfred Odhiambo, Kenyan politician
- Bernard Odhiambo, Kenyan footballer
- Billy Odhiambo (born 1993), Kenyan rugby sevens player
- David Odhiambo (born 1976), Kenyan cricket umpire
- Eisha Stephen Atieno Odhiambo (1945–2009), Kenyan academic
- Eric Odhiambo (born 1989), English footballer
- Kennedy Odhiambo, Kenyan footballer
- Moses Odhiambo (born 1986), Kenyan footballer
- Nehemiah Odhiambo (born 1984), Kenyan cricketer
- Nelson Odhiambo (born 1989), Kenyan cricketer
- Okot Odhiambo, also known as Two Victor, his radio call sign, a senior leader of the Lord's Resistance Army, a Ugandan rebel group
- Peter Amollo Odhiambo, Kenyan consultant thoracic and cardiovascular surgeon
- Peter Odhiambo (born 1966), Kenyan boxer
- Rees Odhiambo (born 1992), American football player in the NFL
- Sunday Odhiambo, Kenyan footballer
- Sylvester Odhiambo, Kenyan association football coach
- Thomas R. Odhiambo (1931–2003), Kenyan entomologist and environmental activist
