= Agnes Odhiambo =

Agnes Odhiambo may refer to:

- Agnes Odhiambo (accountant), Kenyan accountant who serves as the Controller of the Budget of Kenya
- Agnes Odhiambo (activist), Kenyan human rights activist who works at Human Rights Watch
