= Bill Essick =

American baseball player (1880–1951)

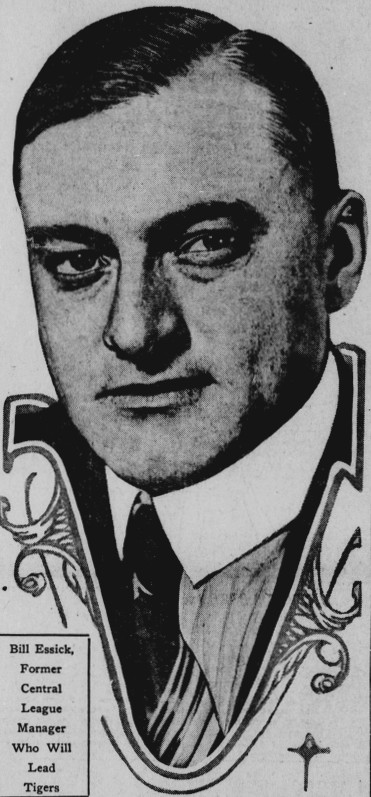
- Pitcher
- Born: December 18, 1880; Grand Ridge, Illinois, U.S.
- Died: October 12, 1951 (aged 70); Los Angeles, California, U.S.
- Batted: Unknown Threw: Right

MLB debut
- September 12, 1906, for the Cincinnati Reds

Last MLB appearance
- May 28, 1907, for the Cincinnati Reds

MLB statistics
- Win–loss record: 2–4
- Earned run average: 2.95
- Strikeouts: 23
- Stats at Baseball Reference

Teams
- Cincinnati Reds (1906–1907)

William Earl Essick (December 18, 1880 – October 12, 1951), nicknamed "Vinegar Bill", was an American professional baseball pitcher in the Major Leagues. A native of Illinois, he attended Knox College and Lombard College.

Essick pitched for the Cincinnati Reds during the seasons of 1906 and 1907. He then became a longtime minor-league manager and team executive before joining the New York Yankees in 1935 as a scout.

According to author Jim Sandoval's 2011 book Can He Play? A Look at Baseball's Scouts and Their Profession, Essick was credited with discovering or signing a number of Yankee future stars, including Joe DiMaggio, Lefty Gomez, Joe Gordon and Ralph Houk. He retired in 1950 and succumbed to heart disease a year later.

As a pitcher, Essick had a remarkable 1905 season in the Pacific Coast League for the Portland Beavers, throwing an astronomical 466.1 innings and ending up with a won-lost record of 23–30. He was 19–6 the following season before being called up to the major leagues by Cincinnati and making his Major League Baseball debut on September 12, 1906.

Sandoval wrote that Essick's nickname originated because the German word for vinegar is "Essig."
