= Hiroshi Kato (disambiguation) =

Hiroshi Kato is a former Japanese football player and manager.

Hiroshi Kato may also refer to:

- Hiroshi Kato (aikido) (1935–2012), an Aikido Master (8th Dan)
- Hiroshi Kato, a character in Japanese manga Be-Bop High School
