= Strittmatter =

Strittmatter is a German surname. Notable people with the surname include:

- Dick Strittmatter (born 1949), American football coach
- Erwin Strittmatter (1912–1994), German writer
- Eva Strittmatter (1930–2011), German poet, wife of Erwin
- Jere Strittmatter (born 1950), American politician
- Louis Strittmatter (1875–?), French footballer
- Mark Strittmatter (born 1969), American baseball player and coach
- Rolf Strittmatter (born 1955), Swiss bobsledder
- Stephen M. Strittmatter (born 1958), American neurologist and neuroscientist

== See also ==
- 99070 Strittmatter, an asteroid
