= Cenčić =

Cenčić is a surname. Notable people with the surname include:

- Avrelija Cencič (1964–2012), Slovenian biochemist
- Max Emanuel Cenčić (born 1976), Croatian-Austrian singer
- Vid Cencic (1933–2020), Uruguayan cyclist
