= Vincent J Coates =

Engineer and philanthropist

Vincent J. Coates
- Born: January 19, 1925; Bridgeport, Connecticut, USA
- Died: December 11, 2012 (aged 87); Cupertino, California, USA
- Education: Yale University
- Occupations: Engineer, Entrepreneur, Philanthropist
- Known for: Innovations in mass spectrometry; Philanthropy in scientific research and education

Vincent J. Coates (January 19, 1925 – December 11, 2012) was an American engineer, entrepreneur, and philanthropist known for his contributions to the field of mass spectrometry and his generous support of scientific research and education.

== Early life and education ==
Vincent J. Coates was born on January 19, 1925, in Bridgeport, Connecticut. During World War II, he worked filing machine parts and attended the Bridgeport Engineering Institute. He later achieved the highest score in Connecticut on the Navy's Officer Candidate School exam, which led him to enroll at Yale University at his mother's urging. Coates graduated in 1946 with a Bachelor of Science degree in mechanical engineering.

== Career ==
After a brief service in the Navy, Coates began his professional career at Chance-Vought Aircraft, where he designed a novel hydraulics "fuse" to enhance the flak resistance of the Navy's new carrier jets. In 1948, he joined Perkin-Elmer Corporation, where he worked with Max D. Liston, John U. White, and Van Zandt Williams to develop double-beam infrared spectroscopy technologies. While there, he played a pivotal role in developing the Model 21, an infrared spectrophotometer. His innovative work on accessories like the Prism Interchange Unit expanded the instrument's market potential.

In 1963, Coates co-founded the Coates & Welter Instrument Company, producing the world's first commercial field-emission scanning electron microscopes (FESEMs). His entrepreneurial ventures continued with the founding of Nanometrics Incorporated in 1975, where he served as president and CEO until 1997. Under his leadership, Nanometrics became a leader in metrology equipment for the semiconductor industry.

== Philanthropy ==
Coates established the Vincent J. Coates Foundation in December 2000, focusing on higher education and neurological research, including studies on Alzheimer's disease and diabetes.

His notable philanthropic contributions include:

- Vincent J. Coates Proteomics/Mass Spectrometry Laboratory at UC Berkeley: In 2007, Coates' donation led to the establishment of this facility, affiliated with the California Institute for Quantitative Biosciences (QB3), providing advanced proteomics services.
- Vincent Coates Foundation Mass Spectrometry Laboratory at Stanford University: His support facilitated the creation of this multidisciplinary facility, offering state-of-the-art mass spectrometry technologies for research in proteomics, metabolomics, and chemical imaging.
- Vincent Coates Chair in Neurology at Yale University: Coates endowed this chair to support neurological research. Stephen M. Strittmatter, was appointed to this position in 2000.
- Vincent J. Coates Chair in Molecular Neurobiology at the Salk Institute: This endowed chair supports research in molecular neurobiology. Edward Callaway, currently holds this position.
- Vincent and Stella Coates Chair at the University of California: This endowed chair supports research in diabetes. Michael T. McManus (biologist), Ph.D., currently holds this position.

== Legacy ==
Vincent J. Coates' innovations in mass spectrometry and his philanthropic efforts have contributed to advances in scientific research and education.
