= Erwin Bischofberger =

Erwin Bischofberger, SJ (1 May 1936 in Switzerland - 5 December 2012) was a Swedish Jesuit and medical practitioner.

== Life ==
Bischofberger came from the Swiss Rhine Valley. He was ordained on 19 March 1961 in the Saint Eugenia Church in Stockholm to the priesthood and spent six years as a chaplain in Gothenburg. On 7 January 1968, he joined the Congregation of the Society of Jesus and in 1974 at the Sankt Georgen Graduate School of Philosophy and Theology in Frankfurt became Doctor of Theology with the work 'The moral requirements of faith on fundamental ethics of John Henry Newman'.

Since 1973 he was a professor of medical ethics at the Karolinska Institute, a medical university in Stockholm and at the Newman Institute, a Jesuit university based in Uppsala. Bischofberger was a member of the Swedish National Ethics Council for 15 years.

He was a priest at St. Eugenia Church in Stockholm since 1983. From 1985 to 1996, he lived in a Jesuit community in Uppsala, then in Stockholm.

He published numerous essays, writings and books. He wrote among other things for the magazine Signum.

== Sources ==
- (Cooperation): Experiment of a welfare society: the model Sweden, 1974, ISBN 3-7867-0487-2.
- The moral presuppositions of faith on Fundamental Ethics of John Henry Newman, 1974, ISBN 3-7867-0443-0; Diss. Philos. Theol. Hochsch. In addition.
- The mystery of Tron: Theological reflection around the supper, 1981.
- God's birth in man: about mystery and inner prayer in Christian tradition, 1986.
- Humanity in Life Issues: A Study Book in Ethics, 1989.
- Human values at life limits: ethical benchmarks for life sciences and health care, 1992.
- Ethics in dental care, 1998.
- Body Ethics, 2002.
- For the world to live, 2004.
- The child in care, 2004.
- Catholic Church in Pocket Format, 2007.
- The hard-won conflict - about the unborn man, 2009.
