= Daniel Gasman =

American historian (1933–2012)

Daniel E. Gasman (1933 – 19 December 2012) was an American historian at John Jay College and the Graduate Center at City University of New York. He earned his PhD from University of Chicago in modern intellectual history. His most famous book is The Scientific Origins of National Socialism, which has been both praised and criticized by scholars. His second book, Haeckel's Monism and the Birth of Fascist Ideology, has been reviewed in journals.

== Books ==
- The Scientific Origins of National Socialism: Social Darwinism in Ernst Haeckel and the German Monist League (London and New York: Macdonald and American Elsevier, 1971) ISBN 0444196641
- Haeckel's Monism and the Birth of Fascist Ideology (New York: Peter Lang: 1998) ISBN 0820441082
