= Thomas Bryant (cricketer) =

South African cricketer (1933–2012)

Personal information
- Full name: Thomas Winston Bryant
- Born: 2 March 1933; Durban, South Africa
- Died: 21 December 2012 (aged 79); Durban, South Africa
- Source: ESPNcricinfo, 21 June 2016

Thomas Bryant (2 March 1933 – 21 December 2012) was a South African cricketer. He played one first-class match for Northerns in 1954/55.
