= Ian Crewes =

Australian rules footballer

Personal information
- Full name: Ian Crewes
- Born: 4 May 1938
- Died: 19 December 2012 (aged 74)
- Original team: Wedderburn
- Height: 178 cm (5 ft 10 in)
- Weight: 74 kg (163 lb)

Playing career^{1}
Years	Club	Games (Goals)
1956	North Melbourne	2 (0)
- ^{1} Playing statistics correct to the end of 1956.

Ian Crewes (4 May 1938 – 19 December 2012) was an Australian rules footballer who played with North Melbourne in the Victorian Football League (VFL).
