= Ian Norton =

English cricketer

Personal information
- Full name: Ian David Norton
- Born: 21 October 1937; Stamford, Lincolnshire, England
- Died: 29 December 2012 (aged 75)
- Source: Cricinfo, 20 June 2016

Ian Norton (21 October 1937 – 29 December 2012) was an English cricketer. He played one first-class match for Oxford University Cricket Club in 1959.
