= Massimo Giustetti =

Italian Catholic bishop

Massimo Biella (28 February 1926 – 4 December 2012) was the Catholic bishop of the Diocese of Biella, Italy.

Ordained to the priesthood in 1950, he was named bishop in 1972 and retired in 2001.
