= Catarina Castor =

Guatemalan politician

Catarina Castor (c. 1980 – December 30, 2012) was a Guatemalan politician and a member of the Patriotic Party. A member of the Congress of Guatemala, Castor was the first woman from the Ixil people, an indigenous Mayan group, to be elected to the national legislature. She had served in the Agricultural, Food Security, and Indigenous Peoples commissions within Congress.

Catarina Castor was killed in a plane crash due to mechanical problems in Nebaj, Quiché Department, Guatemala, on December 30, 2012, at the age of 32. She had been flying en route to Santa Cruz del Quiché for ceremony marking the sixteenth anniversary of the peace agreement which ended the Guatemalan Civil War. The Governor of Quiché Department, Heber Cabrera, survived the crash, but the pilot, Julio Giron, was also killed.
