= Mohammad Amin (historian) =

Historian, Educationist

- Born: 22 January 1928; India
- Died: 15 December 2012 (aged 84); New Delhi
- Occupation: Educationist
- Awards: Padma Bhushan; DLitt
- Website: web.archive.org/web/20150811031351/http://aminsaheb.com/index.html

Mohammad Amin (22 January 1928 – 15 December 2012) was an Indian historian. He was the vice chancellor of Jamia Hamdard; taught History at St. Stephen's College, Delhi University for four decades; and was awarded the Padma Bhushan in 2010.

== Early life and career ==
Amin was born at Qasba Mau-Aima, on the banks of River Ganges, in Prayagraj district of the former United Provinces.

Amin was married to Khurshid and the couple had a son, Shahid Amin, the historian and Rhodes Scholar, and a daughter, Ghazala, who is herself a media personality and a teacher.

His school education started in Prayagraj, from where he moved to Mughal Sarai and finally to Queens Collegiate School in Banares. Subsequently, he took a graduate degree in history from Allahabad University, in 1945, under the renowned historian, Sir Shafaat Ahmed Khan. He earned his master's degree from Aligarh Muslim University in 1949, in both history and law.

=== Academics ===
Mohammad Amin started his career, as a lawyer, in 1947, practising under a lawyer, Bachchan. However, his career as a lawyer was short-lived and he joined St. Stephen's College, Delhi, as a lecturer in 1949, although in between he studied at Cornell University where he secured a master's degree in 1952 and later at Stanford University (1962). He taught at St. Stephen's for 39 years till he retired in 1989 as the Head of the Department of History.

He worked as an expert historian at Al Beruni Institute, on the invitation of the Government of Uzbekistan, from 1994–96.

=== Administrative ===
He was appointed as the vice-chancellor of Jamia Hamdard University in 1990 and worked there till 1993.

He was the chairman of the Governing Body of the Indira Gandhi Institute of Physical Education and Sports Sciences He held memberships of numerous governing bodies of educational institutions, such as the National Council of Population, the central advisory board of the Ministry of Culture, the advisory board of the Archaeological Survey of India and the board of trustees of the Victoria Memorial, Kolkata

== Awards and recognitions ==
- Honorary Causa DLitt – Jamia Millia Islamia University – 2009
- Padma Bhushan – 2010

== Death ==
Amin died on 15 December 2012, succumbing to age-related illnesses, at the age of 84.
