= Ernest England =

Australian cricketer and urologist

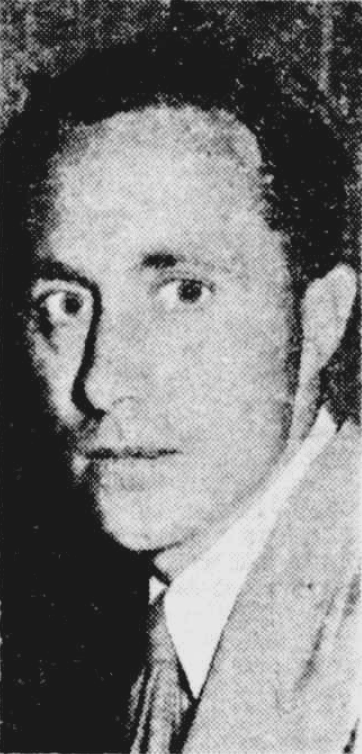

Personal information
- Full name: Ernest James England
- Born: 26 May 1927; Bunbury, Western Australia
- Died: 7 December 2012 (aged 85)
- Batting: Right-handed
- Role: Batsman

Domestic team information
- Years: Team
- 1945–46 to 1953–54: Western Australia
- 1950–51 to 1951–52: South Australia

Career statistics
Competition	First-class
Matches	10
Runs scored	532
Batting average	33.25
100s/50s	1/3
Top score	102
Balls bowled	8
Wickets	0
Bowling average	–
5 wickets in innings	–
10 wickets in match	–
Best bowling	–
Catches/stumpings	5/–
- Source: Cricinfo, 26 September 2020

Ernest James England (26 May 1927 – 7 December 2012) was an Australian cricketer and urologist.

== Life and career ==
Ern England was educated at Wesley College in Perth, the University of Western Australia, and the University of Adelaide, from which he graduated MBBS in 1951. His first position was at Royal Perth Hospital, followed by hospital positions in the United Kingdom and the United States. He returned to Perth in 1963 to take up the position of consultant urological surgeon at Royal Perth Hospital, and remained in that position until he retired in 1990. At the Royal Australasian College of Surgeons he was an examiner in urology, secretary and then chairman of the Western Australia state committee, and a member of the board of urology.

England was a middle-order batsman who played ten first-class matches for South Australia and Western Australia between 1945–46 and 1953–54, mostly during his student years. His highest score was 102 for South Australia in their innings victory over Victoria in 1951–52.

In June 1953, England married Wendy Nunn. They had a daughter and a son, who also became a urologist.
