= Fred Gerard (trumpeter) =

French jazz trumpeter, composer and writer on music

Fred Gerard (March 18, 1924, Besançon, France – December 26, 2012, Ivry-sur-Seine, France) was a French jazz trumpeter, composer, and writer on music.

He had an active performance career from 1941 into the 1990s. He made numerous recordings, both as a session musician and as the leader of his own bands. He played with Alix Combelle in 1948–1949, and was then with Jacques Hélian's band from 1949 to 1951. He simultaneously played with Ernie Royal and his band in 1950–1951, and then played in the band of Raymond Legrand in 1952. He played with numerous other French jazz luminaries over the next several decades; ultimately ending his career in the 1990s as a member of Emile Vilain's band Swing Locomotive.

He authored a trumpet methods book, La Trompette: approche méthodique moderne which was published in Paris in 1989. As a trumpeter he was particularly admired for his skill in the instrument's upper register.
