= Peter Feltus =

American philatelist (1942-2012)

- Born: Peter Randolph Feltus; January 1, 1942; New Orleans, Louisiana, U.S.
- Died: December 5, 2012 (aged 70); Berkeley, California, U.S.
- Occupation: philatelist
- Known for: revenue stamps of Egypt and Sudan

Peter Randolph Feltus (1 January 1942 – 5 December 2012) was an American philatelist, an expert on the revenue stamps of Egypt and Sudan. He was a member of the American Philatelic Society, the Sudan Study Group and, from 1962 until his death, the Egypt Study Circle. As an authority in his field, Feltus helped catalogue Egyptian stamps at the Smithsonian Institution, also.

Peter Feltus was born in New Orleans, scion of an old Southern landowning family. His father, John Hampden Randolph Feltus, worked closely with Secretary of the Treasury Henry Morgenthau Jr. during World War II, and his brother, Alan Feltus, is an internationally recognized painter who lives in Assisi, Italy. Educated at Tulane University and the University of Hong Kong, Feltus was awarded a B.A. in philosophy by the University of California at Berkeley in 1969.

In 1982 he published the first detailed catalogue of Egyptian and Sudanese revenue stamps. Feltus visited Egypt five times in order to prepare the catalogue which, apart from normal Egyptian revenue stamps, included descriptions of cinderella stamps, inter-postal seals and stamps incorporating deliberate errors produced for the collections of King Fuad and King Farouk. In connection with his focus on 19th century Egyptian revenue stamps, Feltus also developed a sideline as a bookseller specializing in Baedeker Guides on Egypt.

He died in Berkeley, California, in 2012.

== Publications ==
- Catalogue of Egyptian Revenue Stamps with Sudanese Revenues & Egyptian Cinderellas. Southfield, MI: Postilion Publications, 1982. ISBN 0-941480-01-1.
- Egyptian postal markings of 1865 through 1879. Oakland, CA: Peter R. Feltus, 1983.
- "The IAFFA Egyptian postmark and the Khedivial Ship Routes" in The Levant, Volume 5, Number 3 (September 2009).
