= Uri Possen =

American academic and economist

Uri Meir Possen was a professor in the Department of Economics at Cornell University, and was the chair of that department. He died December 12, 2012.
