= Semiha Es =

Turkish photographer (1912–2012)

- Born: 1912; Constantinople, Ottoman Empire
- Died: 11 December 2012 (aged 99–100); Istanbul, Turkey
- Resting place: Zincirlikuyu Cemetery, Istanbul
- Occupation: Photographer
- Employer: Hürriyet newspaper
- Known for: First Turkish female war photographer
- Notable work: Korean War photographs
- Spouse: Hikmet Feridun Es

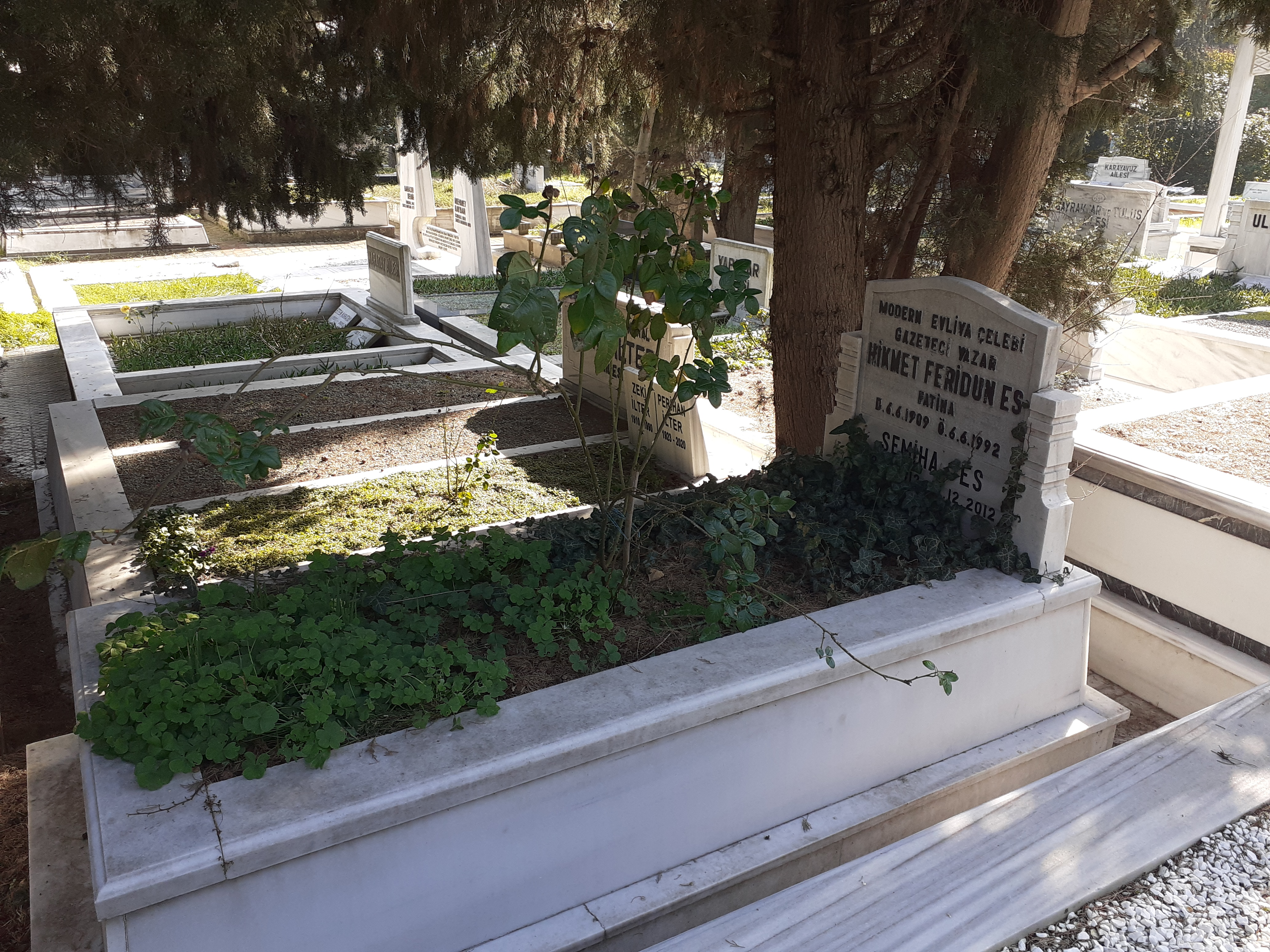

Semiha Es (1912 – 11 December 2012) was the first Turkish female war photographer.

== Early years ==
Semiha Es was born into a modest family to Bekir and his wife Lütfiye at Vefa quarter of Fatih district in Istanbul in 1912. She had a sister. At the age of 15, she worked as a switchboard operator in a telephone company to financially support her family. During a beauty contest application, still underage, she met Hikmet Feridun Es, a well known Turkish journalist. She eloped and married Hikmet Geridun Es after learning that her parents were prepared to give her away in marriage to someone she did not know.

== Career ==
Semiha Es felt lonely as her husband was away on journalistic trips from time to time. He decided to teach her to take photos so that she could be with him on journeys. Their first collaboration was in Hollywood, California. She took photos while her husband was interviewing the celebrities of the time, among them future U.S. President Ronald Reagan.

She accompanied her spouse when he was sent to Korea as a war correspondent by the daily Hürriyet to report about the Turkish Army Brigade's involvement in the Korean War between 1950 and 1953. She served as a war photographer. She was five days a week in the front in military uniform, spent the weekends in Tokyo, Japan, where they were flown by military aircraft. Her photos began to be published in the newspaper from November 5, 1950. However, later it is revealed that only some of her photographs were actually published. These were the photos, which showed heroism of the soldiers. On the other hand, the photos reflecting the tragedy of the war were deliberately edited out. She became so the first female war photographer of Turkey. Semiha Es covered the Vietnam War for five years, and remembers that she experienced the Vietnam War was more horrific than the Korean War.

She shot photos while she traveled around the globe with her spouse for the newspaper.

== Later years and death ==
Semiha Es lost her husband in 1992, and lived her later years in loneliness as they did not have any children. Her life story was told in a documentary film titled Nisvan- Tarihe Adını Yazdıran Kadınlar ("Nisvan-The Women, who Made Their Mark").

She died at the age of 100 at her home at Balmumcu, Beşiktaş in Istanbul on 11 December 2012. She was laid to rest in Zincirlikuyu Cemetery next to her husband.

== Legacy ==
On 28 November 2013, an international symposium, the "Semiha Es - Women Photographers International Symposium" organized by the Sabancı University, was held to commemorate her. During the event, the concert pianist Ayşe Tütüncü performed her musical work named "Second Eye: Women Photographers in Turkey".
