= Jamala al-Baidhani =

Yemeni activist (1977–2012)

Jamala Al-Baidhani
- Born: 1977; Al Aeoff Al Bayda, Yemen
- Died: 15 December 2012 (aged 34–35); Sana'a, Yemen
- Occupation(s): Civil servant, activist
- Known for: Activism for women with disabilities

Jamala al-Baidhani (Arabic: جمالة البيضاني; 1977 – 15 December 2012) was a Yemeni activist who supported civil rights for women and disabled people. She is the founder of the Al-Tahadi Association for Disabled Females, the first group in Yemen devoted to helping girls with disabilities.

== Biography ==
Al-Baidhani was born in Al Aeoff village in the Al Baidha region of Yemen. She was an active child until she contracted meningitis at age seven and became paralyzed due to complications related to the illness. After she recovered, Al-Baidhani used a wheelchair to get around. In 1995, she began working in the Ministry of Social Affairs and also went to college. She received a bachelor's degree in social science.

Al-Baidhani started working with disability rights in the government of Yemen in 1996 but later felt that she wasn't able to reach her goal of bringing services to disabled women while working in the government. In Yemen, most people who have disabilities must rely on disabled persons organizations (DPO) and non-governmental organizations (NGO). Al-Baidhani founded Al-Tahadi as a DPO in 1998. She went on to create the Alesrar NGO for youth development, which helps coordinate volunteerism for those with disabilities, in 2006.

In 2007, the American embassy in Yemen honored her as a "Woman of Courage". In 2008, the Kuwaiti embassy in Sana'a awarded Al-Baldhani $30,000 for her NGO work.

In 2012, Al-Baidhani died in Sana'a from complications related to a respiratory disease. She was buried in the Majel Al-Dema cemetery. Al-Baidhani was awarded the second Balquis Award posthumously in 2013. The prize honors women who have made an "exceptional contribution to the development of Yemeni women".
