= Alexander Leaf =

- Born: Alexander Livshiz; April 10, 1920; Yokohama, Japan
- Died: 24 December 2012 (aged 92); Boston, Massachusetts
- Education: University of Washington; University of Michigan
- Known for: Discoveries about diet and human longevity, and the dangers of global warming to the human species
- Medical career
- Profession: Physician, research scientist
- Institutions: Massachusetts General Hospital; Harvard Medical School
- Sub-specialties: Preventive medicine
- Awards: 1966 Elected to American Academy of Arts and Sciences; 1972 Elected to National Academy of Sciences; 1978 Elected to Institute of Medicine, National Academy of Sciences; 1981 Homer W. Smith Award in Renal Physiology; 1982 Foreign Member, Royal Danish Academy of Sciences and Letters; 1995 Kober Medal of the Association of American Physicians; 1997 A.N. Richards Award of the International Society of Nephrology

Alexander Leaf (April 10, 1920 – December 24, 2012) was a physician and research scientist best known for his work linking diet and exercise to the prevention of heart disease. He also contributed significantly to establishing the relationship between longer, hotter summers and outbreaks of infectious diseases like malaria in regions previously unaffected by them.

Alexander Leaf was born Alexander Livshiz on April 10, 1920, in Yokohama, Japan. His family had fled there after the Bolshevik Revolution. The family name was changed when they emigrated to Seattle in 1922.

After graduating from University of Washington as a chemistry major in 1940, Dr. Leaf received his medical degree from the University of Michigan in 1943, completing his internship and residency at Massachusetts General Hospital from 1944 to 1946.

Dr. Leaf contributed significantly to the understanding of the causes of heart disease through his research on how sodium and potassium pass through cell walls.

He was chief of medical services at Massachusetts General Hospital from 1966 to 1981. In 1961, he became a founding member of Physicians for Social Responsibility, opposing nuclear proliferation. In 1972, he became one of the first practicing physicians ever elected to the National Academy of Sciences.
