= Margarita Costa Tenorio =

Spanish scientist

- Born: 1951-02-16; Vigo, Pontevedra, Spain
- Died: 2012-12-21; Madrid, Spain
- Education: Complutense University of Madrid

Margarita Costa Tenorio (Vigo, Pontevedra, Spain February 16, 1951 - Madrid, Spain December 21, 2012) was a Spanish biologist specialised in botany. She was a professor of the Complutense University of Madrid.

== Biography ==
Margarita Costa Tenorio grew up in Vigo, moved with her family to Madrid and studied biology in the Complutense University of Madrid. In 1974 she joined the Plant Biology Department at the Faculty of Biology, in 1978 completed her PhD and continued working as a professor until her retirement in 2011.

== Contributions and legacy ==
During the early years of her professional career she created a group of young botanists, with professors and alumni, whose studies on a geobotanic interpretation of the forests of the Iberian Peninsula led to the publication of the book "Los bosques ibéricos" (literally, the forests from Iberia) in 1997. This creation, the result of two decades of work, would become a reference for the study of the local vegetation. She also co-authored other books as "Evolución y filogenia".

From 1985 she collaborated in the Royal Society for Spanish Natural History, first as a librarian and later as organizer and speaker in conferences.

She combined her work as a professor with management positions, while engaging in the defence of a high quality public education and being a strong advocate for equal opportunities in education.

In 1998 she started to participate as well in "Natura 2000", a network of nature protection areas in the territory of the European Union.
