= Sunday Odhiambo =

Kenyan footballer

Personal information
- Position: Midfielder

Senior career*
Years	Team	Apps	(Gls)
1999–2001	Mathare United		

International career
2001	Kenya	1	(0)
- * Club domestic league appearances and goals

Sunday Odhiambo is a Kenyan former international footballer who played as a midfielder.

== Career ==
Odhiambo played club football for Mathare United.

He earned one international cap for Kenya in 2001.
