= Keith Crombie =

English music venue owner born in 1939

Keith Crombie (c. 1939 – 29 December 2012) was a British music venue owner and promoter in Newcastle upon Tyne, England. He worked on the North East jazz scene since the 1960s, starting at the Downbeat jazz club. In the early 1990s he started the Jazz Café, a small music venue which he owned and operated until his death in 2012. Crombie was very selective about whom he allowed into the Jazz Café, famously having turned away the entire Newcastle FC squad. Crombie had a colourful past, including a school-era musical collaboration with two members of The Shadows, a brief career as a getaway driver, and dealings with The Krays while working in the nightclub scene.

Crombie was a familiar sight to students at Newcastle University and Northumbria University (he was known as "The Jazz Man"), where he would distribute leaflets advertising his venue. Although the Jazz Café mostly booked local talent and rarely featured any big names, it was often cited as a frequent stop for musicians with business elsewhere in the city. A documentary about Crombie, titled The Jazz Man, and later renamed to Geordie Jazz Man, started filming before his death.

Shortly after Crombie's death a group of enthusiasts and local people set up a co-operative to continue his work of promoting jazz. The Jazz Café was refurbished and opened again after having been closed for a period after Crombie's death and is operated by Newcastle Arts Centre.
