= Jitka Senecká =

Czech volleyball player (1940–2012)

Personal information
- Nationality: Czech
- Born: 11 January 1940; Prague, Czechoslovakia
- Died: 14 December 2012 (aged 72)

Sport
- Sport: Volleyball

Jitka Senecká (11 January 1940 – 14 December 2012) was a Czech volleyball player. She competed in the women's tournament at the 1968 Summer Olympics.
