= Walter Newman (civic figure) =

American civic leader (1921–2012)

Walter Simon Newman
- Born: September 1921
- Died: December 8, 2012 (aged 91)
- Occupations: Civic leader; Philanthropist; Businessman
- Spouse(s): Ellen Magnin Newman (1950–2012; his death)
- Children: Robert; Walter Jr.; John
- Military career
- Allegiance: United States of America
- Branch: United States Army
- Rank: Captain
- Conflicts: Operation Overlord (Normandy, France, 1944)
- Awards: Purple Heart; National Order of the Legion of Honour

Walter Simon Newman (September 1921 – December 8, 2012) was a civic figure in San Francisco, responsible in part for a number of important civic and cultural events in the City's history.

== Early life ==
Newman was an Infantry Officer during World War II where he was injured soon after D-Day. In 2009 the French government made him a Chevalier of the National Order of the Legion of Honour.

== Projects ==
He was involved in the development of the Transamerica Building, Mission Bay, the showing of the King Tut artifacts in the 1970s, and the construction of University High School and the Veteran's Center at City College of San Francisco. Newman was a member of the San Francisco Planning Commission and the San Francisco Redevelopment Agency. He co-founded the National Brain Tumor Foundation after the death of his son from the disease.
