= John Bradley (drag racer) =

American drag racer (1925–2012)

John William Bradley (29 October 1925, San Bernardino, California-29 November 2012, Dolan Springs, Arizona), nicknamed "Mr. Flathead", was a pioneering American drag racer and land speed racer. He was inducted into the International Drag Racing Hall of Fame in 1994.

== Early life ==
Bradley was a veteran of the United States Navy during World War II. He was a member of National Hot Rod Association for sixty years.

== Racing career ==
Bradley started racing in Southern California in 1946, competing on dirt tracks and in illegal street races, with a Deuce roadster. His first dragster used Ford Model T frame rails and a Ford flathead V8; built in 1952, it hit a speed of 147 mph (237 km/h).

Bradley set records beginning in 1956 and was still doing so until a few years ago. He recorded twenty-eight wins in Top Eliminator in 1956 alone.

Bradley drove the tube-chassised Gene's Brake Shop Special digger in 1961. Running on gasoline, Bradley would cheat, hiding nitro in the fuel line to pass scrutineering; nitro had been banned as unsafe for racing by NHRA in 1957. Track officials routinely tore down the carburetors and intake manifold, and tested the front-mounted fuel tank, without finding anything amiss. This car would take Bradley to 50 Top Eliminator titles and a number of track records during 1957 and 1958.

At the Colton Dragster Invitational (Bradley's home track) in 1957, Bradley defeated Emory Cook (in the hemi-powered Cook and Bedwell digger). He lost in the semi-final at the NHRA Fuel and Gass Championship in Bakersfield, California, in 1959, but won that year's Southern California Championship, hosted by the Pomona Valley Timing Association.

Bradley also drove a twin-engined car which used a pair of flatties, in a chassis welded up in Bradley's garage, built with the assistance of long-time partner Max Romero. This car ran 100% nitro, and turned in a pass of 8.98 seconds at 172 mph (277 km/h). He campaigned this car from 1958 to 1962.

Bradley used a high-gear-only transmission in all his dragsters, which resulted in bogging off the starting line when combined with the flathead's poor low-rpm torque. It was because of this he used the nitro.

Unlike other racers, Bradley continued to campaign a flatty-powered digger, earning him the nickname "Mr. Flathead". Bradley retired from professional racing, but continued to run a 9-second flathead-powered exhibition car on California's nostalgia drag racing circuit into his late 70s. This car uses eight-plug billet aluminum cylinder heads Bradley designed himself.

Bradley was inducted into the International Drag Racing Hall of Fame in 1994.

== Family ==
Bradley's wife, Jeanne, died in 1998. He had two children, Frank and Lori, and five grandchildren, Mona and Travis (from his son's marriage), and Nichole, Holly, Tige from his daughter's.

Bradley is buried at Riverside National VA Cemetery, Riverside, California.
