= Albert Elias =

American NFL agent

Albert Elias (16 May 1971 in Dallas – 18 December 2012) was an American NFL agent and chairman of the Elias Sports Management. Elias was an agent for Michael Brockers, Al Woods, Josh Chapman and Travis Daniels including many more.
