= Armand Van De Kerkhove =

Belgian footballer

Personal information
- Date of birth: 29 October 1915
- Date of death: 7 December 2012 (aged 97)

International career
Years	Team	Apps	(Gls)
1940	Belgium	2	(0)

Armand Van De Kerkhove (29 October 1915 – 7 December 2012) was a Belgian footballer. He played in two matches for the Belgium national football team in 1940.
