= Vidal Vega =

Vidal Vega (1964 – 1 December 2012) was a Paraguayan political leader.

Vega had been involved in a feud between the Paraguayan government over land business after land was bought by the government illegally. Some of Vegas' family relatives were land activists and were murdered during the 1960s. He was meant to appear in court and to testify. A prosecutor said that Vega was shot to death on Saturday, 1 December 2012 by two men with a shotgun and a pistol at his home in Canindeyu; the killers sped away on a motorcycle
