= Kazbek Gekkiyev =

- Казбек Геккиев
- Born: c. 1984; Russia
- Died: 5 December 2012; Nalchik, Russia
- Cause of death: Firearm
- Monuments: The Shkolny Lane, a plaque at his old school.
- Occupations: TV Journalist & News Presenter
- Years active: About 3 years
- Employer: VGTRK
- Known for: Reporting low-profile social issues

Kazbek Gekkiyev (Russian: Казбек Геккиев, c. 1984 – 5 December 2012), a Russian TV news presenter and journalist for the All-Russian State Television and Radio Broadcasting Company (VGTRK) in Nalchik, Kabardino-Balkaria, Russia, was shot three times in the head and killed by a gunman outside of his workplace. The gunmen are believed to be linked to the Islamic insurgency in the North Caucasus. He was the seventh journalist killed in the North Caucasus in ten years in connection to his work.

== Personal ==
Gekkiyev was 28 years old at the time of his murder. He was born in Russia and lived in the village of Zhankhoteko in Kabardino-Balkaria, in Russia. He studied at a school.

== Career ==
Gekkiyev was a popular journalist and television presenter at VGTRK in the city of Nalchik, Russia. As a journalist he reported about social issues that didn't attract much attention publicly. He took over the position of the anchor after a video was released in February from local militants alluding to the Islamic insurgency, threatening the previous two news anchors causing them to get pulled off air for safety precautions. Colleagues did not know of any motives for killing Gekkiyev as his reports were never connected to crime or the insurgency in the North Caucasus.

== Death ==
Kazbek Gekkiyev was killed in Nalchik, Kabardino-Balkaria Republic shown here relative to the Russian capital Moscow.

Kazbek Gekkiyev died from three gun shot wounds to the head shot by two men with an automatic weapon late Wednesday night on 5 December 2012 around 9:00 p.m. night local time (17:00 GMT). The scene took place in a parking lot outside of his workplace as he was talking with a fellow female co-worker. Two gunmen approached the two asking Gekkiyev to confirm his identity as the television news anchor, and when he answered yes, they shot the journalist dead on the spot and fled the scene leaving his co-worker unharmed. Investigators believe Gekkiyev's death to be a threat to other journalists and their bosses not to cover news about insurgents in the region. Gekkiyev is the seventh journalist in last decade and first journalist in 2012 to be murdered in Russia in correspondence to his work.

Police established the identities of Gekkiyev's attackers, one of which being Zeitun Boziev and the other unnamed, who was killed by police on 22 January. The Investigatory Committee of the Russian Federation (ICRF) established the suspect in the murder of Kazbek Gekkiev as 30-year-old Zeitun Boziev, who is also lived in Nalchick. Law enforcement started searching for Boziev in 2011 but he went to the forest after he was ordered not to leave. He then joined a group of local armed underground and eventually became the primary candidate as the replacement KBR gunman following the death of the group's leaders.

== Context ==
Kazbek Gekkiyev was the seventh journalist killed in the North Caucasus Region of Russia in ten years in connection to his work. The attack took place in the North Caucasus region, a place known for terrorist attacks and threats organized by the Islamic insurgents against government functionaries, law enforcement, and moderate Muslims. The attacks conducted by the Islamic insurgents are interpreted as a message to journalists and reporters, that if you talk about the Islamic militants, you will be punished. The year 1999 was the worst for journalists with the number of journalists killed reaching 12. In 2009 Natalya Estemirova, journalist and human rights activist, was abducted in Chechnya and her body was later located with gunshot wounds. There were three known beatings and two murders in Dagestan in 2008, and with 3 journalists killed, one including Gadzhimurat Kamalov, worker of the newspaper in Chernovik who was shot and killed, Russia was ranked 6th most dangerous nation out of 40 in 2011. In 2012, Gekkiyev was the only journalist killed in 2012 taking Russia off the list of most dangerous countries for journalists. The attack specifically took place Kabardino-Balkaria, in the North Caucasus Region, which is normally viewed as a quiet republic compared to other parts of the region but has recently seen a sharp increase in militant violence due to police battling the Islamic militants.

In 2005, violence in the region reached its highest point when dozens were killed at different government sites throughout Nalchik, after many simultaneous attacks planned by hundreds of militants were performed. Over 50 people have been placed before a judge, in a trial that has been in process sense 2007. One of Gekkiyevs attackers was identified as Zeitun Boziev, an Islamic militant who was killed by police in January 2013, the other remains unnamed. Boziev had a hand in the murdering of a traffic policeman on 1 June 2012, and a worker at Cherek ROVD on 29 July 2012. Islamic insurgents say their goal is to bring an Islamic state into existence in the region between the Black Sea and Caspian Sea. The insurgents complain of unfair treatment from authorities, police efforts to stop the violence, and tension between different ethnic groups between Balkars and Kabardians in Kabardino-Balkaria and others.

== Impact ==
VGTRK, the station where Gekkiyev worked, canceled all of its entertainment and news programs following his death.

Irina Bokova, director-general of UNESCO, publicly condemned the murder of Russian journalist Kazbek Gakkiyev and encouraged authorities to do their most to bring justice to his killers. She said, "The murder of Kazbek Gekkiyev must not go unpunished. I am encouraged by the rapid reaction of the Russian authorities, who pledged immediately that the crime would be investigated. Bringing the perpetrators to justice will send a clear sign to those who commit such acts that attempting to silence the media is not an option. The rights to freedom of expression, and the right of journalists to carry out their professional duties without fearing their lives, are fundamental conditions for everyone to live in informed and peaceful societies."

Dunja Mijatovic, OSCE Representative on Freedom of the Media urged the authorities to put an end to the impunity by investigating of all killings of journalists. Mijatovic said, "Journalists in Russia are far too often subject to acts of intimidation, threats, and attacks. Sadly, some of these brave members of the media have paid the ultimate price for their fearless work."

President and spokesperson for Russia's Federal Investigation Committee, Vladimir Markin condemned the shooting by comment in Moscow on Thursday 6 December 2012, by saying that the killers violated the victim's "right to live and also the right to disseminate information. At this moment, we can say that the most probable motive was Gekkiyev's professional activity. We can view this impudent crime as a threat to other journalists speaking about the results of the struggle against the bandits underground". "Before killing Gekkiyev, the suspects made sure he was indeed a journalist, the host of a news program, which confirms the main suspected motive."

In an interview about Gekkiyev's murder, Alexander Cherkasov, a board member of the Memorial human rights group, said that this may indicate that these underground groups are prepared to become even more violent. "The new resistance leaders who are younger and have far fewer qualms as who to attack and kill for the sake of their cause must have decided to abide by fewer limits of violence as well, including violence that can now be aimed at journalists too." A popular television presenter and member of the presidential Public Chamber does not agree with Cherkasov and does not believe that Gekkiyev's death was politically motivated.

== See also ==
- List of journalists killed in Russia
