= Angélica M. Arambarri =

Argentine botanist and mycologist (1945–2012)

Angélica Margarita Arambarri (22 April 1945, in La Plata – 11 December 2012, in La Plata) was an Argentine botanist and mycologist. She was vice dean of the Faculty of Natural Sciences and Museum of the National University of La Plata.

== Career ==
Angélica Margarita Arambarri received her PhD in 1982 the National University of La Plata. There she worked as a senior advisor, academic advisor, as a member of Consultive Counsel of the Botany Department, and as vicedean. She was the head of the Mycology Division of the C. Spegazzini Institute.

She was professor and principal investigator of the National Scientific and Technical Research Council.

She won the Luis Federico Leloir Award in Mycology.
