= Bob Johnston (footballer) =

Australian rules footballer

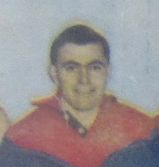

Personal information
- Full name: Bob Johnston
- Born: 29 August 1929
- Died: 15 December 2012 (aged 83)
- Original team: Murrumbeena
- Height: 178 cm (5 ft 10 in)
- Weight: 79 kg (174 lb)

Playing career^{1}
| Years | Club | Games (Goals) |
| 1950–52 | Melbourne | 30 (0) |
- ^{1} Playing statistics correct to the end of 1952.

Bob Johnston (29 August 1929 – 15 December 2012) was an Australian rules footballer who played with Melbourne in the Victorian Football League (VFL).
