= Peter Johnson Sr. =

American lawyer

Peter Johnson Sr. (1921 – December 3, 2012) was an American lawyer.

Johnson was the son of a longshoreman and a seamstress, and began working as a stevedore at the age of 17. A Marine during World War II, Johnson was wounded at the Battle of Iwo Jima in 1945. He worked his way through school as a member of the New York City Police Department, graduating from St. John's University in 1947, and from the St. John's University School of Law in 1949.

In 1951, Johnson helped lead a wildcat strike by longshoremen against shipping companies and the International Longshoremen's Association, which had purportedly colluded to underpay workers and to demand kickbacks from their pay. In the same year, he organized slates of delegates to run against Tammany Hall leaders, whom he accused of corruption; Johnson himself ran against Greenwich Village's Democratic district leader, Carmine DeSapio, described as "Tammany's chieftain". Neither the strike nor the political campaign produced immediate results, but they led to a subsequent purge of the union's leadership and to Tammany's adopting a more open mode of selecting its district leaders.

Johnson co-founded the legal firm Leahey and Johnson. He advised New York Governor Mario Cuomo, and served on mayoral commissions on justice and healthcare.

Johnson died of pulmonary fibrosis at the age of 91.
