= King G. Porter =

American politician

Member of the Tennessee State Senate from the 29th District
- In office 1961–1962

Member of the Tennessee House of Representatives from the Crockett County district
- In office 1955–1957

Personal details
- Born: February 3, 1921 Tennessee, United States
- Died: December 3, 2012 (aged 91) Humboldt, Tennessee, U.S.
- Party: Democratic
- Occupation: farmer

Kingdon Gamaliel Porter (February 3, 1921 – December 3, 2012) was an American politician in the state of Tennessee. Porter served in the Tennessee State Senate as a Democrat. Serving from 1961 to 1962, he represented parts of Dyer, Crockett, and Lauderdale Counties. He previously served in the Tennessee House of Representatives. He was a farmer. He died in Humboldt, Tennessee in 2012.
