= Mahmoud Larnaout =

Tunisian comedic actor

- Born: 1945
- Died: 25 December 2012 (aged 66–67)
- Occupation: Actor

Mahmoud Larnaout (1945 – 25 December 2012) was a Tunisian comedic actor.

== Biography ==
Born in Tunis, Larnaout was an actor and playwright. A native of the Bab Souika district of Tunis, he began in the theatre in school and university troupes. Having joined Taoufik Jebali's El Teatro troupe, he performed roles in plays such as Present by proxy, The Plank of Miracles, Al-Ghoul, as well as Klem Ellil and Fhemt Ella by Taoufik Jebali. He was part of the first generation of the school of youth theatre with, among others, Raouf Basti, Raouf Ben Amor, and Raja Farhat. He also starred in various films – including Making of by Nouri Bouzid and television series, including Dar Lekhlaa and Njoum Ellil.

Larnaout was the director of the Le Mondial cinema in Tunis, and in this capacity was several times a member of the organizing committee of the Carthage Film Festival.

Alongside his theatre and film activities, he also worked as a teacher and then as a banker.

He died in Tunis in 2012.

== Filmography ==
- 2006 : Making Of by Nouri Bouzid
- 2011 : Black Gold by Jean-Jacques Annaud
- 2011 : The Masseur (2011 film)|The Masseur by Anouar Lahouar
