= Mikelis Brizga =

Australian businessman

- Born: Lithuania
- Occupation: Businessman

Mikelis "Mick" Brizga was an Australian businessman. He was born in Lithuania to Latvian parents in May 1911 and died in Australia in December 2012.

Brizga was a leader in the Australian piano industry. He migrated from his homeland of Latvia to Australia in 1938 and starting working with pianos in the 1940s. His business, Brizga Pianos, sold pianos (new and reconditioned) and was a major supplier of piano parts to Australian piano tuners and repairers.

In 2004, the Piano Tuners and Technicians Guild bestowed a special commendation award for Brizga's outstanding contribution to the piano industry.

In his later years, Brizga became well known for his longevity and vitality. He worked full-time until his late 90s and continued to work part-time until a few weeks before his death at 101.
