= Laurie Gallagher =

Australian rules footballer

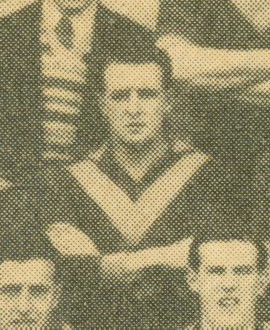
- Gallagher in 1945

Personal information
- Full name: Laurie Gallagher
- Born: 11 June 1924
- Died: 12 December 2012 (aged 88)
- Original team: Fitzroy Seconds / Abbotsford
- Height: 175 cm (5 ft 9 in)
- Weight: 79.5 kg (175 lb)

Playing career^{1}
Years	Club	Games (Goals)
1945	Collingwood	1 (0)
- ^{1} Playing statistics correct to the end of 1945.

Laurie Gallagher (11 June 1924 – 12 December 2012) was an Australian rules footballer who played with Collingwood in the Victorian Football League (VFL).
