= Sylvester Odhiambo =

Sylvester Odhiambo was a Muhoroni Youth F.C. assistant coach and a Kenya Premier League coach after head coach Alfred Imonje was suspended for two months. Odhiambo died on 2 December 2012.
