= Jim Sandoval =

- Born: November 25, 1958; Orange, California, U.S.
- Died: December 27, 2012 (aged 54); Harvest, Alabama, U.S.
- Education: California Baptist University

Jim Sandoval (November 25, 1958 – December 27, 2012) was a baseball researcher, historian and author. A member of the Society for American Baseball Research, he served as the co-chairman of the organization's Scouts Committee. He was known for his extensive work in researching scouts and was integral to completing a scouts database, featured by the Hall of Fame as the "Diamond Mine."

== Career ==
Sandoval was a scout for the Milwaukee Brewers.

His most well-known work is Can He Play? A Look At Baseball Scouts And Their Profession, co-edited by Bill Nowlin and published in 2011. He also contributed to SABR's The Fenway Project and Deadball Stars books.

He contributed to Seamheads.com and the Madison County Record and co-authored Empires: A Simulation Exploring the First Civilizations of the Fertile Crescent and Ancient History Activators: Brief, Engaging Historical Experiences.

His work was cited in numerous books.

== Personal life ==
He was born in Orange, California and died at the age of 54 in Harvest, Alabama. He attended Sonora High School and then California Baptist University.
