= Hiroshi Kato (aikido) =

Hiroshi Kato (加藤 弘, Katō Hiroshi); (1935 – 2 December 2012) was an Aikido Master (8th Dan). He lived in Tokyo, Japan, and travelled the world teaching the principles of Aikido. A former student of Morihei Ueshiba, Sensei Kato taught from 1986 onwards in his Dojo "Suginami Aikikai" (affiliated to Aikikai World Headquarters) located in the Ogikubo district of Tokyo and has over 55 students.

== Early life and training ==
Kato-sensei was born in Tokyo. He began Aikido training in 1954 at Aikido World Headquarters (Hombu Dojo) under the instruction of the Founder of Aikido, Morihei Ueshiba otherwise known as O’Sensei. Introduced to the Aikikai Hombu Dojo through his mother’s network of connections when he was 19, he trained there daily as well as spending long hours perfecting his personal practice. Working during the day as a printer, he attended classes at night, and for this reason he was unable to be an uchideshi, and does not appear in early photographs with them. He continued to train for over 52 years at the Aikikai Hombu Dojo although he later primarily taught at his Suginami Dojo, but he still attended special events at Aikikai Hombu dojo.

After his first 10 years at Hombu Dojo, Kato-sensei occasionally had chances to personally serve the Founder. He pursued Aikido through the Founder’s image, as according to Kato-sensei, “To me, the Founder is not dead. He is still alive in my mind and in my heart.” Kato attended Doshu’s class over three generations: the Founder, the second Doshu, and the current third Doshu. He received his first six black belts from the Founder and his next two black belts from the second Doshu.

His self-training in Aikido has been ascetic. In his early years, he often used to practice weapons by himself through the night, greet sunrise the next morning, and then go to work again. Kato's Aikido had a measure of personal spirituality to it. Before every class, Kato Sensei arrived early to the dojo to meditate. Since he was young, he visited mountain shrines and stayed up all night practicing weapons and meditating.

Kato regarded O’Sensei with utmost respect and considered him to be his only teacher. He said, "Aikido is not something to learn from others, but to learn by oneself. Ideally, the practice should be for oneself, and it should be rigorous and sternly self-disciplined, by one’s own choice."

== Teaching and achievements ==
In 1965, an informal practice group named Yagyu-kai was formed under his guidance and direction. Most of the members were black belt holders and he enjoyed teaching, hard training, and lively conversation after practice.

In 1987, he established Suginami Aikikai (near Ogikubo Station) in Suginami-ku, as a branch dojo under Aikikai Hombu Dojo. The former Yagyu-kai was then incorporated into Suginami Aikikai. At this time, Sensei Kato continued to practice at Hombu. He retired from his work as a printer and taught Aikido full-time.

In 1994, he received 8th dan and in the same year, he began to teach Aikido in the US. He traveled to the U.S. to teach Aikido at his branch dojos in California and in Texas twice a year. He also offers seminars at other Aikikai affiliated dojos as a guest instructor.

From 1999 through 2001, he received commendation for his contribution of promoting Aikido in Houston from the Mayor of Houston. In October 2006, he was recognized for his Aikido contributions by a proclamation of Hiroshi Kato Day from the Mayor of Midland, Texas. In 2001, Suginami Aikikai received commendation from the Governor of Tokyo as an Excellent Organization. This year, he also began to teach Aikido at the Ogikubo Sports Center in Tokyo which is the official place of gathering for the Suginami Aikikai members.

He also visited and taught Aikido in Indonesia every year at IAI (Institut Aikido Indonesia)- Suginami Aikikai.

Reflecting its depth and maturity as a dojo, there are now quite a few high level yudansha (such as 5th and 6th dans) in Suginami Aikikai.

== Philosophy of Aikido ==
For Kato Hiroshi Sensei, Aikido is a way of life not just a martial art (Budo). Sensei Kato's Aikido is a style that resembles much of the one taught at Hombu Dojo by Shihans such as Nobuyuki Watanabe and Seishiro Endo (although not as intense as these two) in a sense that he practices the no-touch throws, using the momentum of the uke but without much touching him. Strong hip movements are applied together with slight feet pivoting movements as well.

Kato Sensei derives his Taijitsu movements from his weapons teachings (Bokuto and Jo).

== Death ==
Hiroshi Kato died on December 2, 2012 at the age of 77.
