= Avrelija Cencič =

Slovenian biochemist

- Born: October 19, 1964; Maribor, Slovenia
- Died: December 14, 2012 (aged 48)
- Scientific career
- Fields: Biochemistry, Immunology, Biotechnology, Molecular Biology
- Institutions: University of Maribor

Avrelija Cencič (pronounced Cen•cich) (19 October 1964 – 14 December 2012) was a Slovenian university professor, researcher in the fields of biochemistry, molecular biology and immunology, manager and educator in health and life sciences.

== Education and training ==
In 2000 she made her PhD (with 1st class honours) from biochemistry and molecular biology of leukocytic and trophoblastic interferon gamma participating with University of Paris XI, Orsay, France and University of Ljubljana, Medical Faculty, Slovenia.

== Work experience ==
She was employed as the Chair of Dept. of Biochemistry at the Faculty of Medicine and Chair of Dept. of Microbiology, Biochemistry, Molecular Biology and Biotechnology at the Faculty of Agriculture and Life Sciences and she was a Vice dean for research and was Vice dean for International Relations at the Faculty of Agriculture and Life Sciences at the University of Maribor.

== Other skills and competences ==
Multi language skills including English, German, French and Croatian.

== Awards ==
- 1987: Award of the University of Maribor; for the outstanding Student research work.
- 1989: Krka award; for the second best pharmaceutically interesting Student research work.
- 1990: Award of the University of Maribor; for the best Student research work (part of the Graduation Thesis work).
- 1994: CIES Fellowship.
- 1995: Slovenian Scientific Foundation Fellowship.
- 2008: Chevalier dans l'Ordre des Palmes Academiques

== Memberships ==
- Slovenian society of microbiologists (since 1989),(A board member since 2002).
- Slovenian society of biochemists (since 2005).
- Federation of European Microbiological societies (since 1996).
- International society of Interferon and Cytokine research (since 1993).
- American Association for the Advancement of Science - AAAS (since 2001).
- CFME-ACTIM (Agence pour la Promotion Internationale des Technologies et des Enterprises Francaises) in Slovenia, since 1998 (A board member between 1998 and 2002).
- Society of University professors of the University of Maribor (since 1996).
- Society of Slovenian - Scottish friendship (since 1999).
- Eursafe (since 2001).
- European federation of Biotechnology (since 2002).
- ALTEX (since 2006)

== Other nominations ==
- 2004 onwards: A member of national committee for GMO.
- 2004 onwards: A president of national committee for Biotechnology at RIC.
- 2005 onwards: An expert in ERA-ARD project.
- 2005 onwards: INTAS evaluator.
- 2006 onwards: A member of national committee for awarding the best research work "Zois award" in Slovenia.
- 2006 onwards: COST programme (expert in Food and Technology)
- 2008 onwards: EFSA expert.
