= Agnes Odhiambo (activist) =

Kenyan human rights activist (died 2023)

- Born: Kenya
- Died: October 2023
- Citizenship: Kenyan
- Education: University of Nairobi (Bachelor of Arts); University of the Witwatersrand (Master of Arts) (Doctor of Philosophy)
- Occupations: Human Rights Activist, Researcher
- Years active: 2009–2023
- Known for: Human rights advocacy
- Title: Researcher at Human Rights Watch

Agnes Odhiambo (died October 2023) was a Kenyan human rights activist, who worked as a senior researcher and advocate for women's rights at Human Rights Watch, from 2009 to 2023.

== Background and education ==
She was born in Kenya, and she attended local Kenyan schools for her pre-university education. Her Bachelor of Arts (BA) degree was obtained from the University of Nairobi. Her Master of Arts (MA) and Doctor of Philosophy (PhD) degrees were both obtained from the University of the Witwatersrand in Johannesburg, South Africa. Her academic research addressed the effect of HIV/AIDS on sexuality and gender.

== Career ==
Before 2009, Agnes Odhiambo worked with the media in Eastern and Southern Africa, to promote women's rights. Her work included provision of space for women to speak out, by monitoring media outlets, training and research. After 2009, she has written extensively on matters affecting women, including obstetric fistula, sexual violence, the inadequate response to abuses against maternity patients by health workers in South Africa, and documented the negative outcomes of forced marriage and forced child marriage in South Sudan and Malawi. She also condemned the presidential directive in Tanzania to ban pregnant students from public schools.

== Death ==
Agnes Odhiambo died in October 2023.
