= Agnes Odhiambo (accountant) =

Kenyan accountant and civil servant

- Born: 1960 (age 65–66); Kenya
- Citizenship: Kenya
- Education: University of Nairobi (Bachelor of Commerce) (Master of Business Administration); Institute of Certified Public Accountants of Kenya (Fellow of the Institute of Certified Public Accountants of Kenya)
- Occupations: Accountant, Financial controller
- Years active: 1983 — present
- Known for: Management
- Title: Chairperson of National Transport and Safety Authority of Kenya
- Spouse: Ezra Odhiambo

Agnes Nangila Odhiambo, is an accountant, financial manager and civil servant in Kenya, who was appointed as chairperson of the National Transport and Safety Authority of Kenya, a parastatal responsible for monitoring and regulating the use of public and private transport in the country. She was appointed on 15 May 2020, for a three-year term.

Before that, she served as the "Controller of Budget of the Republic of Kenya", from August 2011, the first person to serve in that capacity, since office was established. Her tenure there ended in August 2019, after two consecutive four-year terms, the maximum that the law allows.

Immediately prior to that assignment, she was the chief executive officer and secretary of the Constituencies Development Fund Board (CDF Board).

== Background and education ==
She holds a Bachelor of Commerce (BCom) degree, obtained from the University of Nairobi (UON). Her Master of Business Administration (MBA), degree was also awarded by UON. She is a Fellow of the Institute of Certified Public Accountants of Kenya, (FICPAK), an honour bestowed upon her in 2014, in recognition of her body of work and contribution to the profession in Kenya. She has attended several courses in accounting, finance, human resource, information technology and leadership, during the course of her career.

== Private sector experience ==
She began her accounting career in the private sector in 1983 as an assistant accountant at BAT Kenya. After one year at BAT, she transferred to the accounting firm of Deloitte and Touche, working there as a financial consultant. In 1985, she was hired by Unga Group Limited, as a management accountant. Over the years, she was promoted, to the rank of Finance Manager of Unga Group's subsidiary, "Unga Feeds Limited". In 1998, she switched employers, joining the supermarket chain, Metro Cash and Carry Kenya Limited, as the finance manager. In 2003, she was promoted to Director of Finance, responsible for the two subsidiaries, (1) Metro Cash and Carry Kenya Limited and (2) Metro Cash and Cary Uganda Limited.

== Public service career ==
Her public service career began at the government-owned Kenya Post Office Savings Bank (Postbank), where she served as the Director of Finance and Administration. When she left Postbank, she was appointed chief executive officer and company secretary of CDF Board. In this role, she supervised the timely distribution of funds to the Constituencies, with improving efficiency of the process over time, including timely disbursement of funds and timely auditing of the released funds.

In her current role as Controller of the Budget, she overseas the implementation of the budgets of the 47 Counties, those of the Senate, those of the Parliament and the Executive, making sure all monies are accounted for and are disbursed in accordance to existing national laws. Her office generates quarterly reports which are distributed to the executive, senate, parliament and the county councils.

== Other considerations ==
Agnes Odhiambo serves on the board of directors of Kenya Women Microfinance Bank, since August 2013. She is a married mother of three children.

== See also ==
- Government of Kenya
- Counties of Kenya
- Economy of Kenya
- Stella Kilonzo
