= Stephen M. Strittmatter =

- Born: August 25, 1958 (age 68); St. Louis, Missouri, USA
- Education: Harvard College (A.B.), Johns Hopkins University (M.D., Ph.D.)
- Known for: Research in Alzheimer's disease, axonal regeneration, and neural repair
- Awards: King Faisal International Prize (2021), Zenith Fellows Research Award (2013), Senator Jacob Javits Neuroscience Investigator Award (2005)
- Scientific career
- Fields: Neurology, Neuroscience
- Workplaces: Yale University

Stephen Mark Strittmatter (born August 25, 1958) is an American neurologist and neuroscientist. He is the Vincent Coates Professor of Neurology and Professor of Neuroscience at the Yale School of Medicine, where he serves as Chair of the Department of Neuroscience and Director of the Kavli Institute for Neuroscience at Yale. His research focuses on axon regeneration after central nervous system injury and the molecular mechanisms of Alzheimer's disease.

== Early life and education ==
Strittmatter was born in St. Louis, Missouri, on August 25, 1958. He earned his Bachelor of Arts degree, summa cum laude, in biochemistry from Harvard College in 1980. He then pursued combined M.D. and Ph.D. training at Johns Hopkins University, completing both degrees in 1986 under the mentorship of pharmacologist Solomon H. Snyder. His doctoral research was in pharmacology, including studies of neuropeptide processing and angiotensin-converting enzyme in the brain.

== Career ==
Strittmatter completed an internship in medicine and a residency in neurology at Massachusetts General Hospital (MGH) between 1986 and 1990. He continued at MGH as a clinical and research fellow in neurology at Harvard Medical School, working in the developmental biology laboratory of Mark C. Fishman, where he studied the molecular basis of axon guidance.

He joined the faculty at Harvard Medical School in 1991 and held an assistant professorship. In 1993, he moved to the Yale School of Medicine, joining the departments of Neurology and Neurobiology. He was promoted to professor and appointed to the Vincent Coates Professorship of Neurology.

He is a founding director of the Program in Cellular Neuroscience, Neurodegeneration and Repair (CNNR), established in 2005, the Memory Disorders Clinic, and the Yale Alzheimer's Disease Research Center. He became Chair of the Department of Neuroscience in September 2021 and serves as Director of the Kavli Institute for Neuroscience at Yale. In 2024, he became a founding co-director, alongside Lauren Sansing, of the Carol and Gene Ludwig Program for the Study of Neuroimmune Interactions in Dementia at Yale.

Strittmatter founded ReNetX Bio, originally established as Axerion Therapeutics in 2010, to develop therapies for spinal cord injury. He also co-founded Allyx Therapeutics in 2018. He has also been associated with ProteoWise.

== Research ==
Strittmatter's research has focused on two major areas of neuroscience, axonal regeneration and Alzheimer's disease.

His laboratory contributed to identifying Nogo as an inhibitor of axonal regeneration in the adult central nervous system (CNS) and identified the Nogo-66 receptor (NgR1), through which Nogo mediates its inhibitory effects.

In a 2009 study, Strittmatter's team identified the cellular prion protein (PrP^{C}) as a receptor for amyloid beta oligomers, protein aggregates implicated in Alzheimer's disease. Later work demonstrated that PrP^{C} forms a complex with metabotropic glutamate receptor 5 (mGluR5) to mediate synaptic dysfunction.

His group has also investigated frontotemporal dementia, identifying sortilin as a receptor for progranulin and examining the role of TMEM106B in lysosomal dysfunction associated with the disease.

== Awards and honors ==
- 2024: Elected Member, Association of American Physicians
- 2021: King Faisal Prize in Medicine
- 2016: Outstanding Investigator R35 Award, National Institute of Neurological Disorders and Stroke (NINDS)
- 2013: Zenith Fellows Research Award, Alzheimer's Association
- 2005: Senator Jacob Javits Award in the Neurosciences, NINDS
- 2002: Ameritec Award for Spinal Cord Injury Research
- 2001: McKnight Brain and Memory Disorders Award, McKnight Foundation
- 1999: Donaghue Investigator Award, Donaghue Foundation
- 1994: John Merck Scholar in the Biology of Developmental Disorders in Children, John Merck Fund
