= List of Hindi poets =

This is a List of notable Hindi language poets:

== A ==
- Aalok Shrivastav (born 1971), poet, lyricist, and journalist
- Abdul Rahim Khan-I-Khana (1556–1627), composer, poet, and produced books on astrology
- Acharya Shivpujan Sahay (1893–1963), novelist, writer, and prose writer
- Adam Gondvi (1947–2011), poet who wrote about the plight of Dalit
- Agnishekhar (born 1956), real name Kuldeep Sumbly
- Agyeya (1911–1987), poet and editor of Tar Saptak
- A. M. Turaz (born 1974), poet and lyricist
- Amir Khusrau (1253–1325), musician, scholar and poet
- Arun Gemini (born 1959), writer, poet, and satirist
- Arun Kamal (born 1954)
- Asad Zaidi (born 1954), poet, editor, publisher, translator
- Ashok Chakradhar (born 1951), author and poet
- Ashok Vajpeyi (born 1941), bureaucrat-poet
- Atal Bihari Vajpai (1924–2018), author, poet and orator
- Ayodhya Prasad Upadhyay (1865–1947)

== B ==
- Bal Krishna Sharma Naveen (1897–1960), known by the pen name Naveen
- Balli Singh Cheema (born 1952), Aam Aadmi Party politician and poet
- Balswaroop Raahi (born 1936), poet and lyricist
- Banarsidas (1586–1643), poet, businessman
- Bhagwan Datt Sharma (born 1935), poet and scholar of post-WWII Hindi and English Poetry
- Bhai (writer) (1935–2018), Surinamese poet
- Bharatendu Harishchandra (1850–1885), novelist, poet, playwright
- Bhawani Prasad Mishra (1913–1985), poet and author
- Bhikhari Das (1721–1799)
- Bhupendra Nath Kaushik (1924–2007), Hindi and Urdu poet, writer and satirist
- Birbal (1528–1586), also known as Raja Birbal, Mughal advisor and poet
- Bihari Lal (1595–1663), poet, author

== C ==
- Chand Bardai (1149–1200), court poet known for Prithviraj Raso
- Chandrakant Devtale (1936–2017)
- Chirag Jain (born 1985) Poet of epic "Purushottam"
- Choudhari Mulkiram (1910–1954) poet, philosopher and writer

== D ==
- Dharmveer Bharti (1926–1997), poet, author, playwright and a social thinker
- Dhirendra Verma (1897–1973), poet and writer
- Dinesh Bhramar (born 1939), Hindi and Bhojpuri poet
- Dnyaneshwar Mulay (born 1958), diplomat and poet
- Durbalnath, Indian saint
- Dushyant Kumar (1933–1975), poet of modern Hindustani

== G ==
- Gafil Swami (born 1953), poet and journalist
- Gajanan Madhav Muktibodh (1917–1964)
- Ganga Prasad Vimal (1939–2019), writer, poet, novelist, and translator
- Geet Chaturvedi (born 1977), poet, short story author and journalist
- Ghananand (1673–1760), poet of the Reeti Era
- Girish Tiwari (1945–2010), scriptwriter, lyricist, and poet
- Gopal Singh Nepali (1911–1963), poet of Hindi literature and lyricist of Bollywood
- Gopal Prasad Vyas (1915–2005), poet, known for his humorous poems
- Gopaldas Neeraj (1925–2018), poet and author
- Gulab Khandelwal (1924–2017), poetry including some in Urdu and English
- Guru Bhakt Singh 'Bhakt' (1893–1983), poet and dramatist

== H ==
- Hari Shankar Sharma (1891–1968), Hindi and Urdu poet
- Harikrishna Prasad Gupta Agrahari, Hindi and Nepali language poet
- Harivansh Rai Bachchan (1907–2003), poet of Chhayavaad literary movement (romantic upsurge)
- Hasrat Jaipuri (1922–1999), Hindi and Urdu poet
- Hemant Joshi (born 1954), professor, writer, and poet
- Hemant Shesh (born 1952), writer, poet and civil servant
- Hith Harivansh Mahaprabhu (1502–1552), Braj Bhasha poet-sant and bhakti religious leader
- Hullad Moradabadi (1942–2014), poet, humorist and satirist

== I ==
- Ibrahim Ashk (1951–2022), poet and lyricist
- Imran Pratapgarhi (born 1987), Hindi and Urdu poet, politician
- Indira Indu
- Indra Bahadur Khare (1922–1953), Chhayavaad writer and poet
- Irshad Kamil (born 1971), poet and lyricist

== J ==
- Jacinta Kerketta (born 1983), poet and journalist
- Jaishankar Prasad (1889–1937), novelist, playwright, poet
- Jagdish Chaturvedi (writer) (1932–2015)
- Jagdish Gupt (1924–2001), Chhayavaad literary movement poet
- Javed Akhtar (born 1945), poet, lyricist and scriptwriter
- Joba Murmu, poet and writer of Santali literature
- Jwalamukhi (1938–2008), poet, novelist, writer and political activist
- Jyotsna Milan (1941–2014), poet, novelist, short story writer and editor

== K ==
- Kabir (1440–1518), mystic poet and saint of India
- Kailash Vajpeyi (1936–2015), poet, writer, and lyricist
- Kaka Hathrasi (1906–1995), satirist and humorist poet
- Kamlesh Shukla (Socialist) (1937–2015), anti-Emergency poet
- Kanhaiya Lal Nandan (1933–2010), poet and lyricist
- Kavi Bhushan (1613–1712), poet and scholar
- Kavi Pradeep (1915–1998), poet and songwriter
- Kedarnath Agarwal (1911–2000), Hindi language poet and littérateur
- Kedarnath Singh (1934–2018), poet, critic and essayist
- Keshavdas (1555–1617), Sanskrit scholar and Hindi poet
- Kishorilal Goswami (1865–1932), writer and poet
- Koduram Dalit (1910–1967), Chhattisgarhi and Hindi poet
- Kripa Shankar Sharma
- Kripalu Maharaj (1922–2013), spiritual master (Jagadguru) and a poet-saint
- Krishna Kumar Sharma "Betaab" (1922–2001), Indian independence activist and poet
- Kumar Vikal (1935–1997)
- Kumar Vishwas (born 1970), poet and professor
- Kunwar Bechain (1942–2021), professor and poet
- Kunwar Narayan (1927–2017)

== L ==
- Lari Azad (born 1959), historian and poet
- Laxmi Shankar Bajpai (born 1955)
- Laxminarayan Payodhi (born 1957), poet and researcher
- Leeladhar Jagudi (born 1940), journalist and poet

== M ==
- Madan Mohan Malaviya Indian independence activist, educational reformer, and poet
- Mahadevi Varma (1906–1987), poet, freedom fighter, woman's activist and educationist
- Mahendra Bhatnagar (1926–2020), post-Independence Hindi and English poet
- Mahendra Pratap Singh (1930–2022), author, historian, and researcher
- Mahesh Garg Bedhadak (born 1966), Hindi poet and writer
- Mamta Kalia (born 1940), author, teacher, and poet
- Maithili Sharan Gupt (1886–1964), poet, politician, dramatist, and translator
- Malik Muhammad Jayasi (1477– 1542), Sufi poet and Pir
- Makhanlal Chaturvedi (1889–1968), Indian poet, writer, essayist, playwright and a journalist
- Meera (1498–1547), mystic singer and composer of Bhajans
- Mirabai, 16th-century Hindu mystic poet, Bhakti saint, and devotee of Krishna
- Mohan Rana (born 1964), poet, columnist, and lyricist
- Motilal Jotwani (1936–2008), writer and educationist
- Mrityunjay Kumar Singh (born 1961)
- Munishree Nagraj, writer and poet
- Murari Lal Sharma ("Neeras") (born 1936), author, poet and educator

== N ==
- N. Chandrasekharan Nair, poet, novelist, and dramatist
- Nagarjun (1911–1998), poet, writer, essayist, novelist
- Nalin Vilochan Sharma (1916–1961), professor and poet
- Nand Chaturvedi (1923–2014), poet and littérateur
- Narendra Mohan (poet) (born 1935), poet, author, and playwright
- Naresh Mehta (1922–2000), poet and playwright
- Narottam Das (1550–1605), the writer of 'Sudama Charitra' and contemporary of Tulsidas
- Nathuram Sharma (1859–1932), Hindi poet, known by his pen-name "Mahakavi Shankar"
- Nawal Kishore Dhawal (1911–1964), writer, poet, proof reader, editor, critic, journalist and author
- Neelabh Ashk (1945–2016), poet, journalist, and translator
- Nemi Chandra Jain (1919–2005), poet and critic
- Nirjhar Pratapgarhi, Awadhi and Hindi language poet
- Nirmal Verma (1929–2005), writer, novelist, and translator
- Nivedita Jha, Hindi poet, journalist and women's rights activist

== O ==
- Om Prakash Aditya (1936–2009)

== P ==
- Pandit Narendra Sharma (1913–1989), poet, writer, and lyricist
- Pankaj Rag (born 1964), poet and IAS officer
- Parmanand Adhir (1939–2013), politician, poet, and writer from Jind district in the northern Indian state of Haryana
- Pawan Karan (born 1964), poet, writer, editor, journalist, columnist, social and political analyst
- Phoolchand Gupta (born 1958), poet, writer and translator
- Prasoon Joshi (born 1971), advertiser, lyricist, and poet
- Prabhakiran Jain (born 1963), poet and writer
- Prabha Thakur (born 1951), poet, writer, composer and Indian politician
- Prem Kishore Patakha (born 1943)

== R ==
- Raghuvir Sahay (1929–1990), short story writer, poet, and essayist
- Raghuvir Sharan Mitra (1919–1966), writer and poet
- Rahi Masoom Raza (1927–1992), Urdu and Hindi poet and writer, Bollywood lyricist
- Rajesh Joshi (born 1946), writer, poet, journalist, and playwright
- Ram Ratan Bhatnagar (1914–1992), scholar, professor, writer and critic of poetry and literature
- Ram Prasad Bismil (1897–1927), poet, writer, and revolutionary
- Ram Vilas Sharma (1921–2000), academic and writer
- Ramavtar Tyagi (1925–1985), poet
- Rambhadracharya (born 1950), religious leader and educationist.
- Ramdhari Singh Dinkar (1908–1974), poet, essayist and academic
- Ramesh Chandra Jha (1928–1994), poet and writer of ghazals
- Ramkumar Verma (1905–1990), poet and publisher of one-act plays
- Raskhan (1548–1628), Sufi poet and later devotee of Krishna
- Ravindra Prabhat (born 1969), writer, poet, editor, critic, journalist and author
- Rustam Singh (born 1955), poet, philosopher, translator and editor

== S ==
- Sachchidananda Vatsyayan (1911–1987), poet, writer, novelist, journalist, traveler
- Samartha Vashishtha (born 1983)
- Sandeep Nath, poet and Bollywood lyricist
- Saroj Kumari Gaurihar (1929–2022), politician and poet
- Sarvesh Asthana (born 1965), poet, writer, and satirist
- Sarveshwar Dayal Saxena (1972–1982), poet who helped start the 'Prayogvaad' (Experimentalism) era
- Satyapal Anand (1931–2025), Indian-American poet, critic, and writer
- Shabab Aalam (born 1984), poet
- Shabbir Ahmed (lyricist), Bollywood lyricist and music composer
- Shail Chaturvedi (1936–2007), poet, humorist, lyricist, actor
- Shailesh Matiyani (1931–2001), poet, writer, and essayist
- Shambhunath Singh (1916–1991), writer, poet
- Shambhu Shikhar (born 1984)
- Shankardas Kesarilal Shailendra (1923–1966), poet, lyricist; known for his poetry used in Hindi cinema
- Sharad Joshi
- Dnyaneshwar Mulay (born 1958), diplomat and poet
- Sheetal Agashe (born 1977), business woman and former actress
- Shrikant Verma (1931–1986)
- Shrinivási (1926–2019), Surinamese poet
- Sheila Gujral (1924–2011), Hindi, Punjabi, and English poet and writer
- Shiv Prasad Dabral (1912–1999), historian, geographer, academic, and writer, known by his pen name "Charan"
- Shivmangal Singh Suman (1915–2002), poet and academic
- Shyam Narayan Pandey (1907–1991)
- Shyamlal Gupta (1896–1977), poet and lyricist, popularly known by his pen name "Parshad"
- Sitaram Agrahari (born 1957), journalist and editor
- Sohan Lal Dwivedi (1906–1988), Indian independence activist and poet
- Sonroopa Vishal (born 1977), writer, poet, and author
- Soumitra Mohan (born 1938), poet and exponent of the Akavita (अकविता - anti-poetry) movement
- S.R. Harnot (born 1955)
- Sri Lal Sukla (1925–2011), author and writer
- Subhadra Kumari Chauhan (1904–1948), poet known for her emotionally charged songs
- Sudama Panday 'Dhoomil' (1936–1975), poet known for his revolutionary writings and protest-poetry
- Sūdan (1700–1753)
- Suman Pokhrel (born 1967), poet, lyricist, translator, and artist
- Sumitranandan Pant (1900–1975), Chhayavaad poetry, verse plays and essays
- Sunderdas (1596–1689), saint, poet, philosopher, and social reformer
- Sunil Jogi, author and poet of comic verses
- Surender Sharma (born 1945), poet, writer, and humorist
- Surdas (1467–1583), composer and devotional poet
- Suryadev Singh Bareth, advocate and poet
- Suryakant Tripathi 'Nirala' (1899–1961), poet, novelist, essayist and story-writer
- Suryakumar Pandey (born 1954), poet, writer
- Susmita Basu Majumdar, Hindi and Urdu poet

== T ==
- Tara Singh (born 1952), writer and poet
- Teji Grover (born 1955), poet, fiction writer, translator and painter
- Tulsidas (1497/1532–1623), poet-saint, reformer and philosopher

== U ==
- Uday Prakash (born 1952), scholar, poet, journalist, translator and short story writer
- Uday Pratap Singh (born 1932), politician
- Urmilesh Shankhdhar (1951–2005), poet, writer, and lyricist

== V ==
- Verma Malik (1925–2009), poet and Bollywood lyricist
- Viren Dangwal (1947–2015), poet, academic, and journalist
- Virendra Kumar Baranwal (1941–2020), poet and writer
- Vishnu Khare (1940–2018), Hindi journalist, translator and poet
- Vishwanath Prasad Tiwari (born 1940), poet, editor, and critic
- Vrind (1643–1723), Braj Bhasha poet
- Vitthalbhai Patel (1936–2013), poet and Bollywood lyricist
- Vinay Kumar, psychiatrist and poet

== See also ==
- List of Hindi-language authors
- List of Indian poets
- List of Indian writers
