= Mahesh Garg Bedhadak =

Indian poet

Mahesh Garg
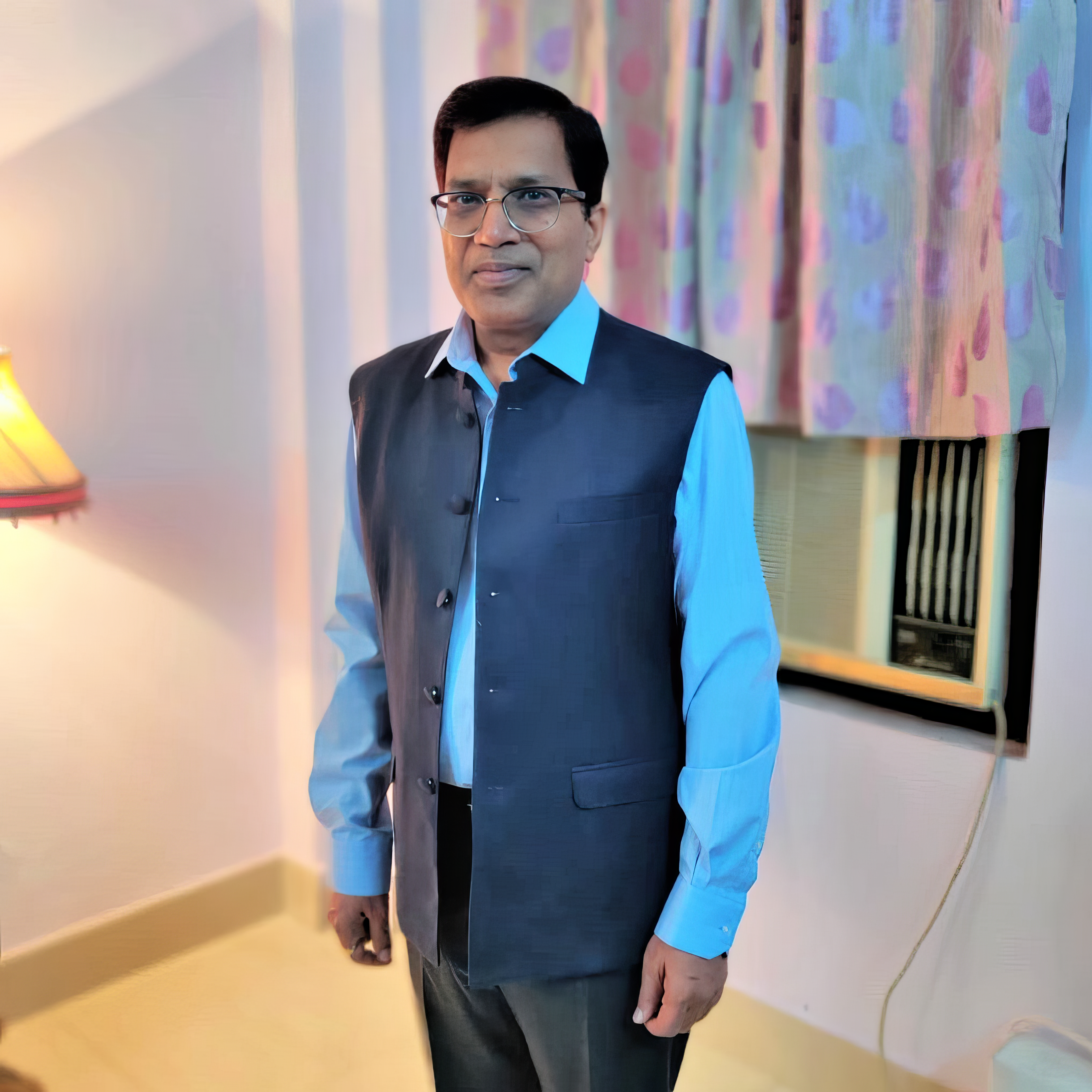
- Portrait photo of Poet Mahesh Garg Bedhadak, 2024
- Born: 5 December 1966 (age 59); Agra, Uttar Pradesh, India
- Education: Madhav Institute of Technology and Science, Gwalior; IIT, Delhi
- Occupations: Poet, Author, Engineer
- Years active: 1986–present

Mahesh Garg (born 5 December 1966) is an officer of Indian Railways. He is an established Hindi poet and writer, with pen name BEDHADAK.

== Early life ==
Mahesh Garg was born at Agra, a town in Uttar Pradesh, India.

== Career ==
=== Poetry ===
He is an established Hindi poet, popularly known as BEDHADAK. He has participated in hundreds of Kavi Sammelan including the prestigious Republic Day Kavi Sammelan at Lal Quila, Delhi, Taj Mahotsav at Agra, and many programmes organized by Sahitya Akademi, including performances on TV channels and radio channels.

साँसों का स्पंदन है वह जीवन का अहसास है माँ
मंदिर, मस्जिद, गुरुद्वारा क्या जिसके दिल के पास है माँ
घी-चीनी वर्जित है तुझको क्या पकवान खिलाएगा?
जितनी तेरी उम्र हुई है उतने तो उपवास है माँ!

क्या-क्या जुगत करते हैं ये मजदूर जीने के लिए
खून को ईंधन बनाते हैं पसीने के लिए
ये उजाले के लिए दीए बनाते रह गए
बातियां हुशियार थीं सब तेल पीने के लिए

=== Engineering ===
Mahesh Garg did his graduation in Mechanical Engineering from MITS Gwalior and M.Tech from IIT Delhi. He belongs to 1987 batch of Indian Railway Service and has received national award for outstanding service in 2005 by Ministry of Railways. He has to his credit the Design patent of Regulated Discharge Coach Toilet System. He is also a Fellow of the Institution of Engineers, India.

== Filmography ==
=== Television ===
Years	Title	Role
2005	Wah Wah (on SAB TV)	Himself
2021	DD Kala Sangam (Episode - 17)	Himself
2022	Wah Bhai Wah	Himself

== Awards ==
Mahesh Garg has won several literary awards, including Maithili Sharan Gupt Puraskar in 2014, Kaka Hathrasi Samman 2018, and Hindi Academy Gyan-Prodyogiki Puruskar, 2023-24.

== Bibliography ==
No.	Title	Author	Publisher	Date	Genre	Length	ISBN
1	Thahaka Express	Mahesh Garg 'Bedhadak'	Diamond Books	2015	Poems & Ghazals	112p	9789351655855
2	Barfiyan Vyangya Ki	Mahesh Garg 'Bedhadak'	Prabhat Prakashan	January 2021	Satire	128p	9789390378319
3	Rang Hasi Ke	Mahesh Garg 'Bedhadak'	Prabhat Prakashan	August 2023	Humour & Satire	144p	9789390372690

== Gallery ==
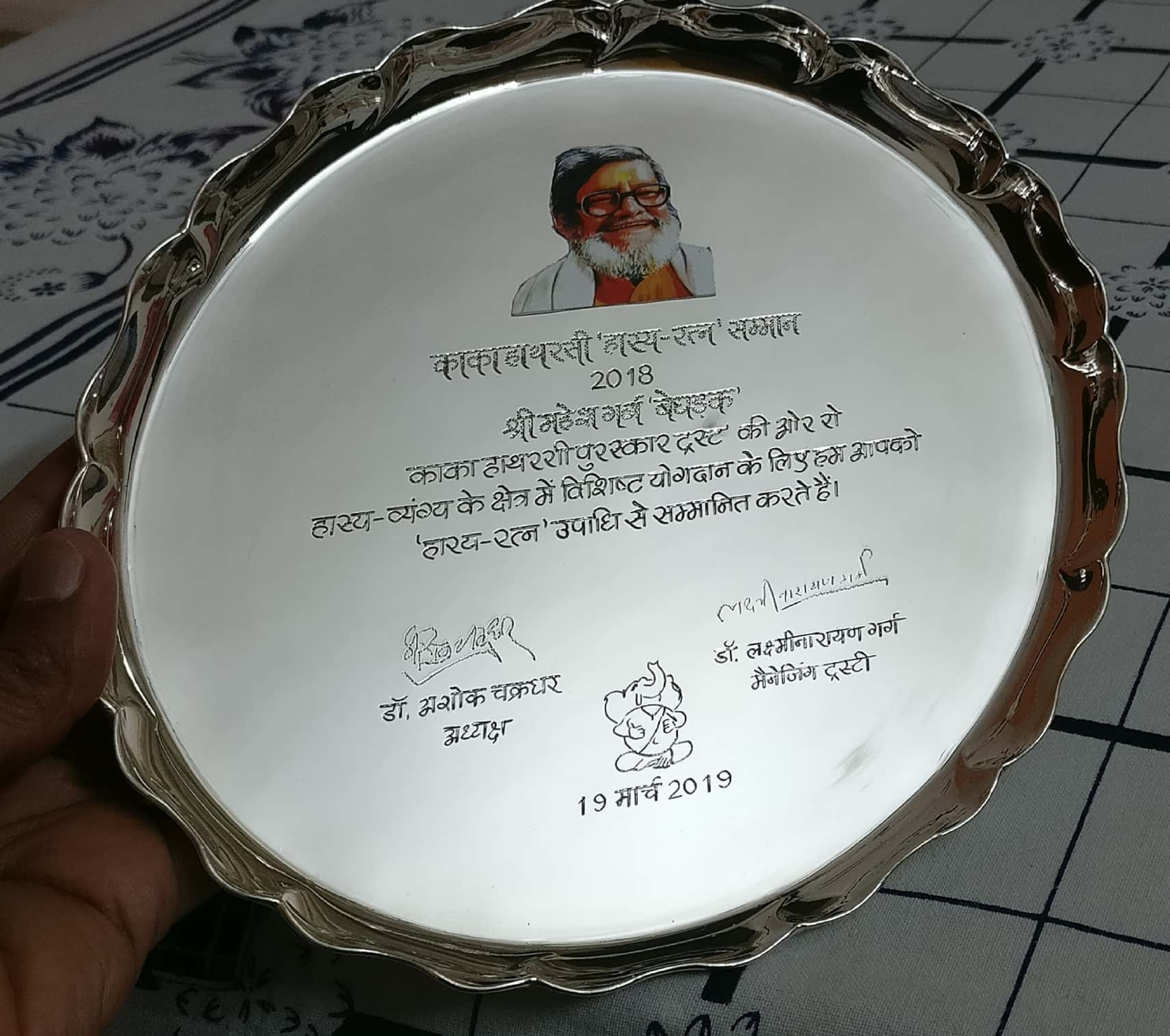
Kaka Hathrasi Samman awarded to Poet Mahesh Garg Bedhadak, 2019
