= Chirag Jain =

Indian poet and writer (born 1985)

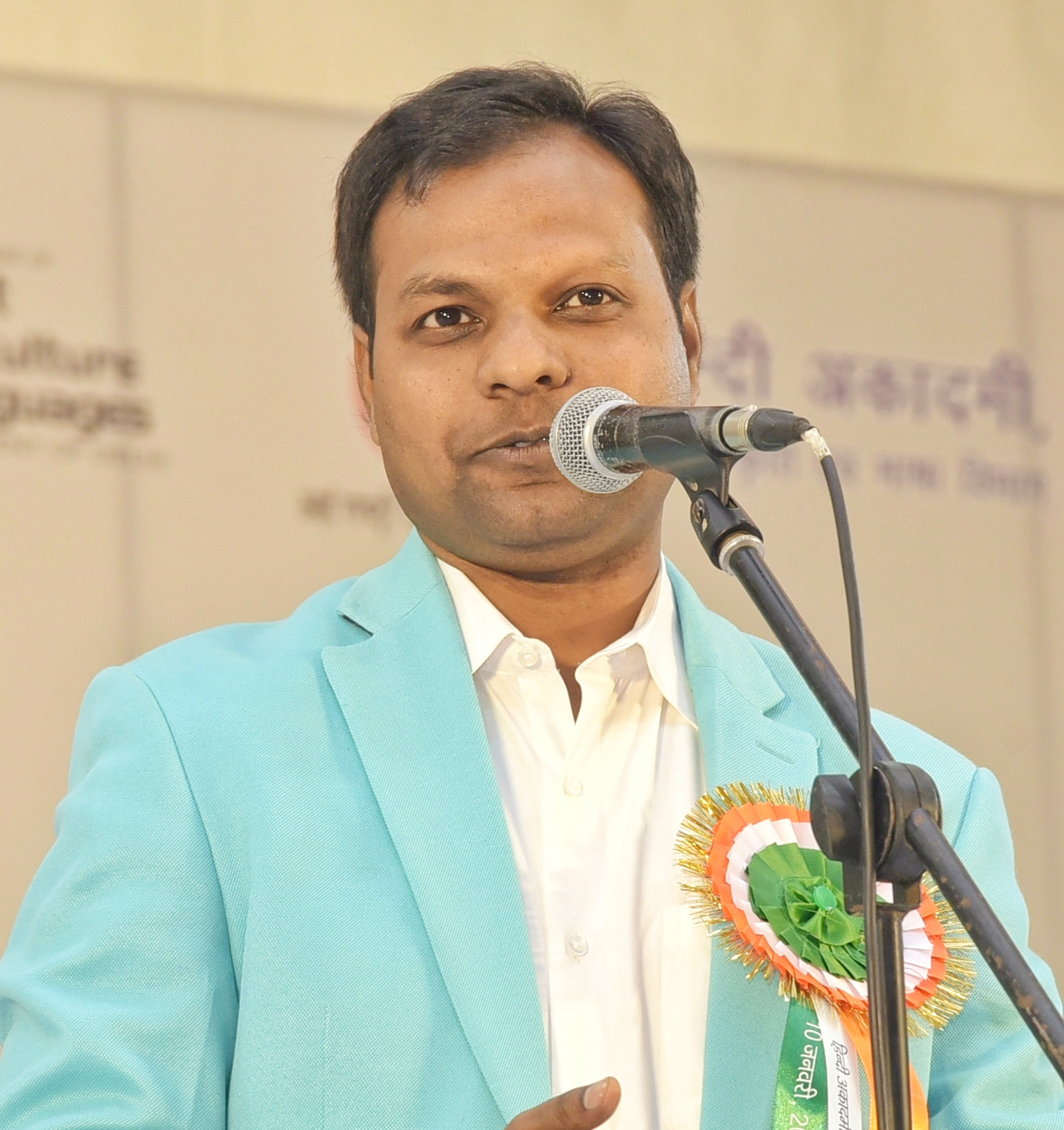
- Born: 27 May 1985 (age 41); Delhi, India
- Education: University of Delhi; Vardhaman Mahaveer Open University
- Occupations: Poet, Writer, Satirist
- Writing career
- Language: Hindi
- Notable works: Koi Yoon Hi Nahi Chubhta, Os, Man To Gomukh Hai, Chhookar Nikli Hai Bechaini
- Notable awards: Bhashadoot Samman by Government of Delhi, 2016

Chirag Jain (born 27 May 1985) is an Indian poet, satirist, humourist and author who writes and performs in Hindi. His performances have been featured on various TV shows, including Sab TV's Wah Wah Kya Baat Hai, Sahara One's Laugh India Laugh, Aaj Tak's KV Sammelan, News 18's Netaji Lapete Mein and News Nation's Chunavi Chakallas.

He has authored more than 7 books, including Koi Yoon Hi Nahi Chubhta, Os, Man To Gomukh Hai, Chhookar Nikli Hai Bechaini.

On 14 September 2016, Chirag Jain received the Bhashadoot Samman (award) from the Hindi Academy, Government of Delhi, on the occasion of Hindi Divas, in recognition of his contribution to popularizing the Hindi language through digital media.

== Early life and career ==
Chirag was born in 1985 in New Delhi, India. He holds a bachelor's degree in Mass Communication from the University of Delhi and a master's degree from Vardhaman Mahaveer Open University, Kota. He has recited his poetry during Kavi sammelans at the Red Fort and in various cities across India.

Jain introduced his debut poetry collection, Koi Yoon Hi Nahi Chubhta, published by Shilpayan Prakashan in 2008, He published his second poetry collection, Os, followed by Man To Gomukh Hai, Jaago Phir Ek Baar, Pahli Dastak, Doosari Dastak and Chhookar Nikli Hai Bechaini.

Chirag Jain has recited his humorous poetry at SAB TV comedy poetry show, Wah! Wah! Kya Baat Hai! and Sahara One's Laugh India Laugh in 2012. He also performed at KV Sammelan on Aaj Tak in 2019. He has been featured in numerous poetry-based TV shows Aaj Tak's KV Sammelan, News 18's Netaji Lapete Mein and News Nation's Chunavi Chakallas. Jain is a founder member and joint secretary of Kavi Sammelan Samiti.

Chirag worked as dialect coach in the Bollywood film Kahan Shuru Kahan Khatam released in the September 2024.

Purushottam is an epic penned by Chirag Jain is one of the most popular poetry based on Ramayana. Chirag perform this epic as a monologue in live shows. First show of Purushottam has been performed in New Delhi. Now this show is attracting audience all over the world.

== Bibliography ==
- "Koi Yoon Hi Nahi Chubhta", (2008) Publisher: Shilpayan Prakashan
- "Os", Publisher: Pankhi Prakashan
- "Man To Gomukh Hai", (2015), Publisher: Pankhi Prakashan ISBN 978-9381501306
- "Jaago Phir Ek Baar", Publisher: Rashtriya Kavi Sangam
- "Pahli Dastak", Publisher: Pankhi Prakashan
- "Doosari Dastak", Publisher: Pankhi Prakashan ISBN 9788190834728
- "Chhookar Nikli Hai Bechaini", (2018), Publisher: Remadhav Art ISBN 9789380424507
- "Gullak 1", (2025), Publisher: Indian University Press ISBN 9789348182159
- "Gullak 2", (2025), Publisher: Indian University Press ISBN 9789348182050
- "Gullak 3", (2025), Publisher: Indian University Press ISBN 9789348182166
- "Gullak 4", (2025), Publisher: Indian University Press ISBN 9789348182524
- "Gullak 5", (2025), Publisher: Indian University Press ISBN 9789348182142
- "Gullak 6", (2025), Publisher: Indian University Press ISBN 9789348182319
- "Gullak 7", (2025), Publisher: Indian University Press ISBN 9789348182623
- "Gullak 8", (2025), Publisher: Indian University Press ISBN 9789348182869

== Television ==
Show	TV Channel
Wah! Wah! Kya Baat Hai!	SAB TV
Arz Kia Hai	NDTV
Laugh India Laugh	Life OK, Sahara One
KV Sammelan	Aaj Tak
Netaji Lapete Mein	News18 India
Chunavi Chakallas	News Nation
Waah Kavi Ji	Mahuaa TV
Hansi Ke Phuware	Big Magic
Bahut Khoob	Dabangg
Rang Tarang	Times Now NavBharat
Kavya Goshthi	Doordarshan
Kavi Sammelan	ABP News

== Awards and recognition ==
- Kaka Hathrasi Hasya Ratna Award by Kaka Hathrasi Puraskar Trust, 2024
- Indraprastha Kavya Ratna Samman by Indraprasth Agrawal Samaj, 2024
- Chitra Kala Sangam Samman, New Delhi, 2024
- Sarthak Srijan Samman, Akhil Vihswa Hindi Samiti, 2023
- Kailash Gautam Yuwa Kavi Samman, 2024
- Bhashadoot Samman by the Hindi Academy, Government of Delhi, 2016
- Saraswat Award by Janki Devi College, University of Delhi, 2016
- Shabda Sadhak Award by the Rotary Club, Delhi, 2016
- Lekhak Award by the Writers & Journalists Association, Delhi, 2014
- Hindi Sevi Award by the Bharat Vikas Parishad, New Delhi, 2014
- Kavihridaya Award by the Indian Medical Association, 2013
- Chhupa Rustam Award at Wah Wah Kya Baat Hai, SAB TV, 2013
- Jagdish Mittal Award by the Rashtriya Kavi Sangam, 2009

== See also ==
- List of Hindi-language poets
- List of Hindi-language authors
