= Surender Sharma =

Indian poet, writer and humorist

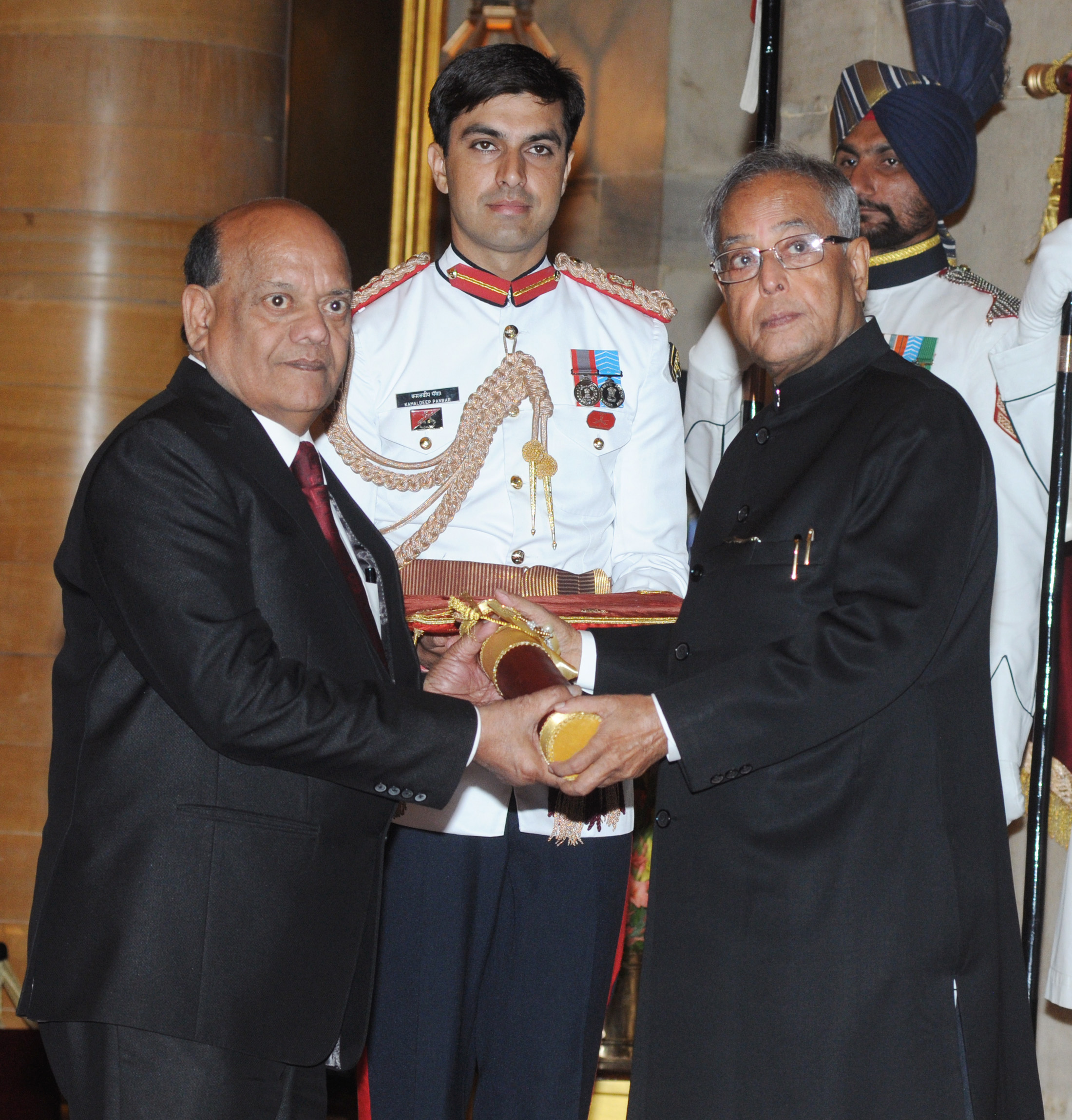
- Pranab Mukherjee presenting the Padma Shri to Surender Sharma at the Rashtrapati Bhavan in New Delhi in 2013
- Born: Surender Kumar Sharma; 1945 (age 80–81); Nangal Choudhary, Haryana, India
- Education: Shri Ram College of Commerce, Delhi University
- Occupations: Poet, writer
- Title: Vice President of Hindi Academy
- Term: October 2018
- Predecessor: Vishnu Khare
- Successor: Incumbent
- Awards: Padma Shri (2013)

Surender Sharma (also written as Surendra Sharma) (born 1945) is an Indian poet, writer and humorist. He often writes and performs comic sketches of himself and his wife and known for his refrain chaar lainaa suna raha hoon in Haryanavi dialect. He was honoured by the Government of India in 2013, with the award of Padma Shri for his contributions to the field of literature.

In October 2018, he was appointed as the Vice-Chairman of Hindi Academy, Government of Delhi, succeeded by Vishnu Khare. Previously, he held the position of vice-president of Haryana Sahitya Academy, which is run under Haryana government. He is also a member of the Central Board of Film Certification.

== Early life and career ==
Surender Sharma was born into a Brahmin family in Haryana. He hails from a village Nangal Choudhary of Mahendragarh district, Haryana. He holds a degree in Commerce from Shri Ram College of Commerce of Delhi University.

In an interview with Mid-Day, Sharma said, he started performing poetry in 1966 when he was in college, but, started doing it professionally since the 1970s. He uses Marwari and Haryanavi dialect for his humour.

In 1980, the T-Series released a cassette named Chaar Laina Kavi.

In 2004, he hosted his own daily radio show, Sharmaji Se Poocho, which used to air on Red FM 93.5. In the nineties, he edited three poetry collections under the title Ras Kalash. He serves as a trustee and vice president for the Bhagwan Parshuram Institute of Technology.

== Published work ==
- Mansarovar Ke Kauwe ISBN 9788128813283
- Buddhimaanon Ki Moorkhtaaein
- Bade-Badon Ke Utpaat ISBN 978-93-5278-564-3
- Mujhse Bhala Na Koy

== Awards and recognition ==
Apart from Padma Shri, He is also a recipient of Kaka Hathrasi Hasya Samman and Manhar Thahaka Award.

== See also ==
- List of Hindi-language poets
- List of Hindi-language authors
