= Nirjhar =

Nirjhar is a surname and given name. Notable people with the name include:

- Enamul Karim Nirjhar (born 1962), Bangladeshi architect and filmmaker
- Nirjhar Pratapgarhi, Indian poet
