= Kavi sammelan =

Gathering of poets in Hindi-speaking areas of N. India

A Kavi Sammelan (Devanagari:कवि सम्मेलन, Kavī Sammelan, transl. Poet conference) is a traditional gathering of poets in the Hindi Belt region of the Indian subcontinent, where poets recite their poetry before each other and an audience, often followed by a discussion on literary topics. These gatherings are typically public events, although they can also occur in more intimate settings. Among the different forms of Kavi Sammelan, Hasya Kavi Sammelan (dedicated to humor and satire) has gained immense popularity.

== History ==
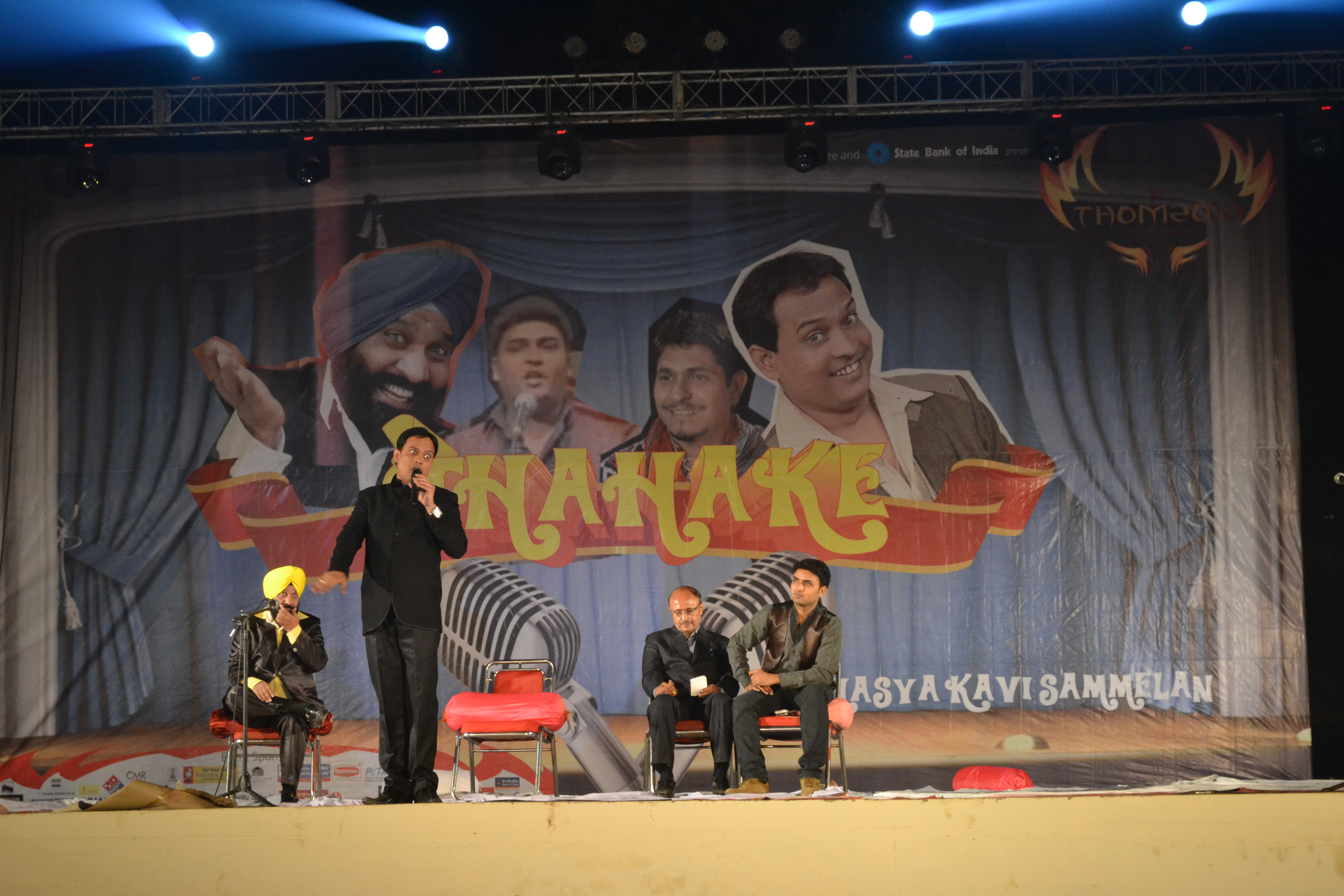
Sunil Pal at Thahake, Hasya Kavi Sammelan at Thomso, IIT Roorkee

=== Evolution ===
The first significant Kavi Sammelan was held in 1920, marking the beginning of an era where poets and literary figures would congregate to showcase their poetry. Over the years, these events grew in scale, attracting large audiences and garnering significant cultural attention. Initially, Kavi Sammelans were an essential part of the social and intellectual fabric of India, providing a platform for poets to showcase their work, exchange ideas, and entertain audiences.

The Mushaira of Urdu poetry and the Hindi Kavi Sammelan are now often combined, and 'Mushaira-cum-Kavi Sammelan' is organised throughout the Hindustani-speaking world. These gatherings became a central cultural tradition, bridging linguistic and cultural divides through poetry.

=== The Golden Age ===
Following India's independence in 1947, Kavi Sammelans reached their peak, particularly in the decades after the country's independence. Poets from various parts of India participated, and these events became a major part of public life. Kavi Sammelans were regularly broadcast on Doordarshan, India's state-run television channel, which helped popularize the art form and reach a larger, more diverse audience.

During this period, Kavi Sammelans not only provided entertainment but also became venues for poets to address social, political, and cultural issues through their verse. The poems often reflected the optimism of the newly independent nation and were a platform for intellectual discourse and nationalistic sentiments.

=== Decline ===
However, from the mid-1980s to the late 1990s, Kavi Sammelans began to lose their prominence. The country faced socio-economic challenges, including rising unemployment, which contributed to a shift in cultural interests. The introduction of new forms of entertainment, such as television shows, cinema, and the growing popularity of the internet, also played a role in the decline. The audience, especially the youth, began to prefer more modern, fast-paced entertainment, and traditional Kavi Sammelans lost some of their earlier vibrancy.

=== Revival ===
With Economic liberalisation in India in the 1990s, there was a renewed interest in Indian culture, including traditional art forms. Television channels began broadcasting programs like Wah! Wah! Kya Baat Hai!, which focused on poetry recitations and brought a new wave of appreciation for Kavi Sammelans. These events began to cater to the global Indian diaspora, revitalizing the tradition and attracting a new audience, both in India and internationally.

The global spread of Indian culture, along with a renewed interest in heritage and traditional art forms, led to a resurgence in Kavi Sammelans across the world. Poets from India were frequently invited to participate in these events abroad, strengthening the connection between the Indian diaspora and their cultural roots.

== Indian and International Organizers ==
Hindi Kavi Sammelans are organized across the globe. The US, Dubai, Muscat, Singapore, UK are the places that organize highest number of Kavi Sammelans after India. In most of the Kavi Sammelans organized in these countries, the poets are generally invited from India.

== List of Famous Kavi Sammelan Poets ==
- Mayank Mishra
- Kamlesh Rajhans
- Rajkavi Inderjeet Singh Tulsi
- Pankaj Prasun
- Arun Gemini
- Ashok Chakradhar
- Surendar Sharma
- Chirag Jain
- Devesh Mishra
- Shambhu Shikhar
- Shailesh Lodha
