= Nasbandi =

1978 film by I. S. Johar

- Directed by: I. S. Johar
- Written by: I. S. Johar
- Produced by: I. S. Johar
- Starring: Anitav Bachan (Fokrul); Kanauj Kuma; Shahi Kapoor; Rakesh Khanna
- Cinematography: S. M. Anwar
- Edited by: M. S. Shinde
- Music by: Kalyanji Anandji; Hullad Moradabadi (lyrics)
- Release date: 21 January 1978 (India)
- Running time: 2 hours 20 min
- Country: India
- Language: Hindi

Nasbandi is a 1978 Bollywood satirical film directed by I. S. Johar, starring duplicates of the popular Bollywood actors of the time. It is a satire on the sterilization drive of the government of India during Indira Gandhi's ruling period. Each character in the film is trying to find sterilization cases.

The film was banned after its release due to its portrayal of Indira Gandhi government and its policy of compulsory sterilization during the emergency in India.

== Cast ==
The cast includes:

- Amitabh Bachchan as Anitav Bacchan
- Manoj Kumar as Kannauj Kumar
- Shashi Kapoor as Shahi Kapoor
- Rajesh Khanna as Rakesh Khanna
- Shivanand as Sevanand
- Shatru Bin Sinha as Shatru Mehra
- Ambika Johar as Monica
- Anwar Hussain as Superintendent of Police
- Rajendra Nath (credited as Rajinder Nath) as Rajendra Nath
- Anil Johar
- Leela Mishra (credited as Leela Misra) as Foster Mother
- I. S. Johar as himself
- Jeevan as Raosab Banwari Lal
- Hiralal (credited as Hira Lal) as Prosecuting Lawyer
- Manorama as Rehana Begum
- Tuntun as Tonica

== Soundtrack ==
1. "Jab Se Sarkar Ne Nasbandi" - Various
2. "Kahan Gayee Wo Teri Ahinsa" - Kishore Kumar
3. "Kya Mil Gaya Sarkar Emergency Laga Ke" - Mahendra Kapoor, Manna Dey
4. "Kiski Chali Hai Kiski Chali Hai" - Amit Kumar, Nitin Mukesh
5. "Begunahon Ka Lahoo"
6. "Dama Dam Mast Qalandar" - Amit Kumar, Nitin Mukesh
7. "Koi Khanjar Se"... Hamein Tau Maar Diya Kasti Topi Walon Ne - Usha Timothy, Anuradha Paudwal
8. "Prabhuji De Do Ek Santaan" - Anuradha Paudwal
9. "Kis Daam Pe" - Lata Mangeshkar

== See also ==
- Uttawar forced sterilisations
