= Gafil Swami =

Indian poet (born 1953)

- Born: Gaurishankar Singh; 22 July 1953 (age 73); Aligarh India
- Occupations: Poet, Journalist
- Known for: Poetry

Gafil Swami (born 22 July 1953, Aligarh) is an Indian poet of Hindi-language from Aligarh, Uttar Pradesh. He is known for his poetry on corruption.

== Biography ==
He was born to Dheeri Singh and Dhaura Devi in Lalpur village of Aligarh district in Uttar Pradesh. In 2012, a collection of his poetry called "Jai Ho Bhrashtachar Ki" was published by Nirupama Publication, Meerut.

In March 2013, he was awarded by Shabd Pravah Sahitya Manch, Ujjain.

== Published work ==
- Jai Ho Bhrashtachar Ki, 2012

== See also ==
- List of Indian poets
- List of people from Uttar Pradesh
- List of Hindi-language poets
