= Mohan Rana =

Indian poet (Born: 1964)

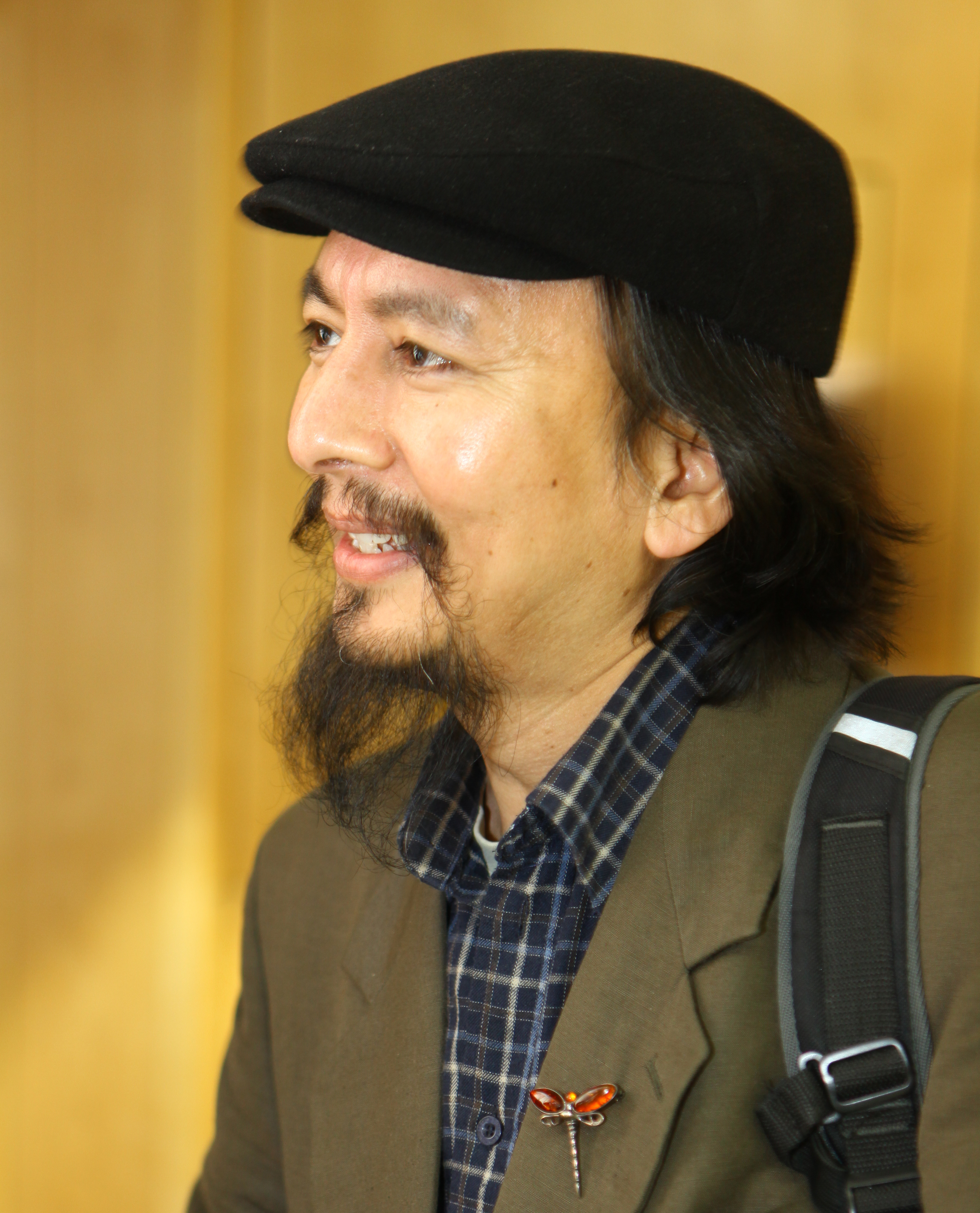
- Born: 9 March 1964 (age 62); Delhi, India
- Occupation: Poet

Mohan Rana (born 9 March 1964) is a Hindi language poet from India. He has published ten poetry collections in Hindi. His poems have been translated and published by the Poetry Translation Centre.

== Biography ==
Mohan Rana was born in Delhi, India. He completed his graduate degree from Delhi University.

== Literary career ==
The poet and critic, Nand Kishore Acharya, has written about Mohan Rana's poetry that,

"Amongst the new generation of Hindi poets, the poetry of Mohan Rana stands alone; it defies any categorisation. However, its refusal to fit any ideology doesn't mean that Mohan Rana's poetry shies away from thinking - but that it knows the difference between thinking in verse and thinking about poetry. For Mohan Rana the poetic process in itself is also thought process".

A bilingual chapbook "Poems", an eclectic selection of fifteen poems, translated from Hindi by Lucy Rosenstein and Bernard O'Donoghue was published by the poetry translations center London in June 2011. Sarah Maguire writes, ‘Mohan Rana’s vivid and accessible poems probe profound philosophical questions through the simple, everyday imagery of stars, birds, rain and shirts. These deceptively understated, haunting poems, have been beautifully rendered into English by the distinguished Irish poet, Bernard O’Donoghue, working closely with the translator, Lucy Rosenstein and Mohan himself.’

The Chapbook "Poems" was world literature tour recommendation in the Guardian, "His poems offer an intriguing bridge between two cultures; a sense of dislocation alongside a sense of place." The Guardian world literature tour recommendations: India

In the afterword of 'The Cartographer', Alison Brackenbury writes "Mohan Rana’s intricate metaphysical poems are subtle, like water they define through transparency. His poems undertake the deceptively simple process of understanding things as they are, in their ordinary brilliance. This selection of profound, contemplative verse – so often concerned with memory and time – is an excellent introduction to one of Hindi poetry’s most enthralling voices."

François Matarasso writes in his review of "The Cartographer", Mohan Rana’s concerns are not with the minutia of the day’s events, or the constantly renewed feelings that blow through our minds. He is in search of deeper, more elusive ideas that touch on the nature and meaning of existence. That involves testing other borders than those humans make between countries or even languages: nameless, invisible boundaries, in his own words.

== Bibliography ==
=== Poetry collections in Hindi ===
- Jagah (Dwelling, 1994)
- Jaise Janam Koi Darwaza (As If Life Were a Door, 1997)
- Subah ki Dak (Morning's Post, 2002)
- Is Chhor Par (On This Shore, 2003)
- Pathar Ho Jayegi Nadi (Stone-River, 2007)
- Dhoop Ke Andhere (In the Darkness of the Sun, 2008)
- Ret ka Pul (Bridge of Sand, 2012)
- Shesh Anek (Much Remains, 2016)
- Mukhuaute Men Do Chehre (Two Faces in the Mask, 2022)
- Ekaant Men Roshandaan (Solitude in Skylight, 2023)

=== Bilingual poetry collections ===
- Poems (Poems translated by Lucy Rosenstein, Bernard O’Donoghue, June 2011)
- The Cartographer (Poems translated by Lucy Rosenstein, Bernard O’Donoghue, November 2020)

=== Trilingual poetry collection ===
- Nekje Daleč Sem Uzrl Zvezde (I saw the stars far off, Poems translated from English to Slovenian by Andrej Pleterski, August 2020)

== See also ==
- List of Hindi language poets
