= Hullad Moradabadi =

Indian poet, humorist and satirist

Hullad-Moradabadi (Hullarh Moradabadi)
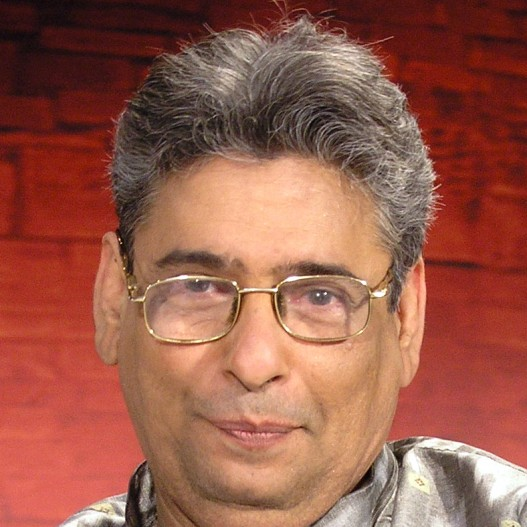
- Born: Susheel Kumar Chadha; 29 May 1942; Gujranwala India. (Now in Pakistan)
- Died: 12 July 2014 (aged 72); Mumbai
- Education: KGK College, Moradabad, Uttar Pradesh, India
- Occupations: Teacher (1969), Satirist, Poet, Actor, Lyricist, Astrologer
- Organization: Haas-Parihaas (Savera)
- Notable work: Hullad ka Hullad
- Spouse: Krishna Chadha
- Children: 3

Hullad Moradabadi (29 May 1942 – 12 July 2014) was an Indian poet, humorist and satirist of Hindi language. He had authored several Hindi books including Itni uchi mat chodo, kya karegi chandni, Ye ander ki bat hai, Triveni and Hullad ka Hullad. He was a poet of Hindi Kavi sammelan.

== Early life and background ==
Born in Gujranwala, now in Pakistan as Susheel Kumar Chadha on 29 May 1942. He settled in Moradabad, Uttar Pradesh after independence and later shifted to Mumbai. He completed his B.Sc. and later an MA in Hindi.

== Literary career ==
He shifted to Mumbai in 1977, where he lived for the rest of his years. He also wrote lyrics for Hindi satirical film Nasbandi directed by I. S. Johar, released after the Emergency in 1978. He also acted as a comedian in films Bandhan Baahon Ka (1988) and Santosh (1989).

Moradabadi has written Itni uchi mat chodo, kya karegi chandni, Ye ander ki bat hai, Triveni, Tathakathit bhagwano ke naam (awarded), Hullad ka Hullad,:Hazam ki hazamat and Aacha hai per kabhi kabhi.

Moradabadi's poems have been quoted by several poets in Kavi-Sammelan.

He had several records produced by His Master's Voice and T-Series and he has been to Hong Kong, Bangkok, Canada, Australia, London, Manchester and America for various Kavi Sammelans.

== Books ==
- Itni uchi mat chodo
- Kya Karegi Chandni
- Ye Ander Ki Bat Hai
- Triveni
- Tathakathit bhagwano ke naam (awarded)
- Main bhi soochu tu bhi sooch
- Hullad ka Hullad
- Hazam ki hazamat
- Hullad Hazara
- Damdar aur doomdar dohe
- Jigar Se Bidi Jala Le
- Hullad Ki Shrast Hasya Vyang Rachnae
- Aacha hai per kabhi kabhi
- Hullad ke Jokes

== Death ==
He died aged 72 on 12 July 2014 in Mumbai after suffering diabetes and a thyroid problem. He left behind a wife, a son-Navneet Chaddha and two daughters.
