= Uttawar forced sterilisations =

Compulsory sterilisation event in India

- Date: November 6, 1976
- Location: Uttawar, Palwal district, Haryana, India
- Type: Male compulsory sterilization
- Theme: Birth control
- Target: Meo Muslim population
- Perpetrators: Indira Gandhi government Sanjay Gandhi
- Outcome: 800+ sterilized

The Uttawar forced sterilisations were mass vasectomy drives on November 6, 1976, imposed on the male population of Uttawar, a Meo Muslim-majority village in Palwal district (then part of Gurgaon district), Haryana, during India’s Emergency (1975–1977) imposed by then Prime Minister Indira Gandhi. Villagers woke up to the sound of police loudspeakers at 03:00. The police gathered 400 men at the bus stop. In the process of finding more villagers, police broke into homes and looted. This event made international news and is today remembered as one of the most coercive and controversial episodes of Sanjay Gandhi’s programme of compulsory sterilisation, which resulted in over 800 sterilisation cases.

== Background ==
In June 1975, Indian Prime Minister Indira Gandhi declared a national Emergency, suspending civil liberties and enabling governance by decree. Sanjay Gandhi, her son, championed aggressive population control measures. Official quotas for sterilisation were imposed: in 1976 alone, over 6 million men underwent vasectomy, many under duress; more than 8 million sterilisation surgeries were reported from 1976–1977, with allegations of coercion and fatalities.

== The Uttawar Operation ==
The village belonged predominantly to the Meo community of Muslims, which opposed the family planning programs. Fearing that the opposition would spread to the neighbouring villages, the state officials decided to teach them a lesson and use coercion. Power supply to the village was cut twice in October 1976, and police initiated legal cases against villagers for firearm possession. When police raided the village, the village elders proposed that they would bring forth men after the planting season, but that didn't satisfy the officials.

On November 6, 1976, around 3 am, law enforcement surrounded Uttawar (90km (56 miles) from New Delhi)—home to approximately 800 eligible men—using mounted police, loudspeaker announcements, and intimidation. Authorities demanded men over 15 report to the village school to fulfil sterilisation targets. Villagers later recounted being corralled into buses, detained at police stations, abused, and transported to makeshift clinics for vasectomy procedures under forced conditions. Around 800 sterilisation cases are documented.

== Resistance and Community Response ==
Abdul Rehman, the village head, resisted initial attempts by authorities to round up men, reportedly declaring: “You can’t neuter even a Mewati dog, leave aside our men.” Many remained hidden in the nearby Aravalli hills until the raid commenced. Some villagers voluntarily surrendered, such as Mohammad Deenu, to spare others; others attempted escape or were detained.

Nasbandi (1978), a Hindi satirical film directed by I. S. Johar was made on the sterilisation drive of the government; however, upon its release, the film was banned by the government.

== Aftermath and Long-term Impact ==
The psychological and social trauma persisted for decades: families reportedly faced stigma, marriage prospects were severely affected, and victims suffered mental health impacts. No accurate official death toll exists, although villagers claim multiple men died due to complications or post-sterilisation trauma.

== Significance ==
The Uttawar incident typifies the coercive nature of Sanjay Gandhi’s sterilisation campaign, especially its targeting of Muslim-majority rural areas. Use of police quotas, intimidation, and communal bias has been widely criticized. National backlash for these “nasbandi” drives contributed significantly to Indira Gandhi’s and Congress’s defeat in the 1977 elections.

== See also ==
- The Emergency (India)
- Compulsory sterilization
- Human rights in India

== Bibliography ==
- The Legacy of India’s Quest to Sterilize Millions of Men Pulitzer Center, OCTOBER 1, 2018
