= Arun Gemini =

Indian writer and poet (born 1959)

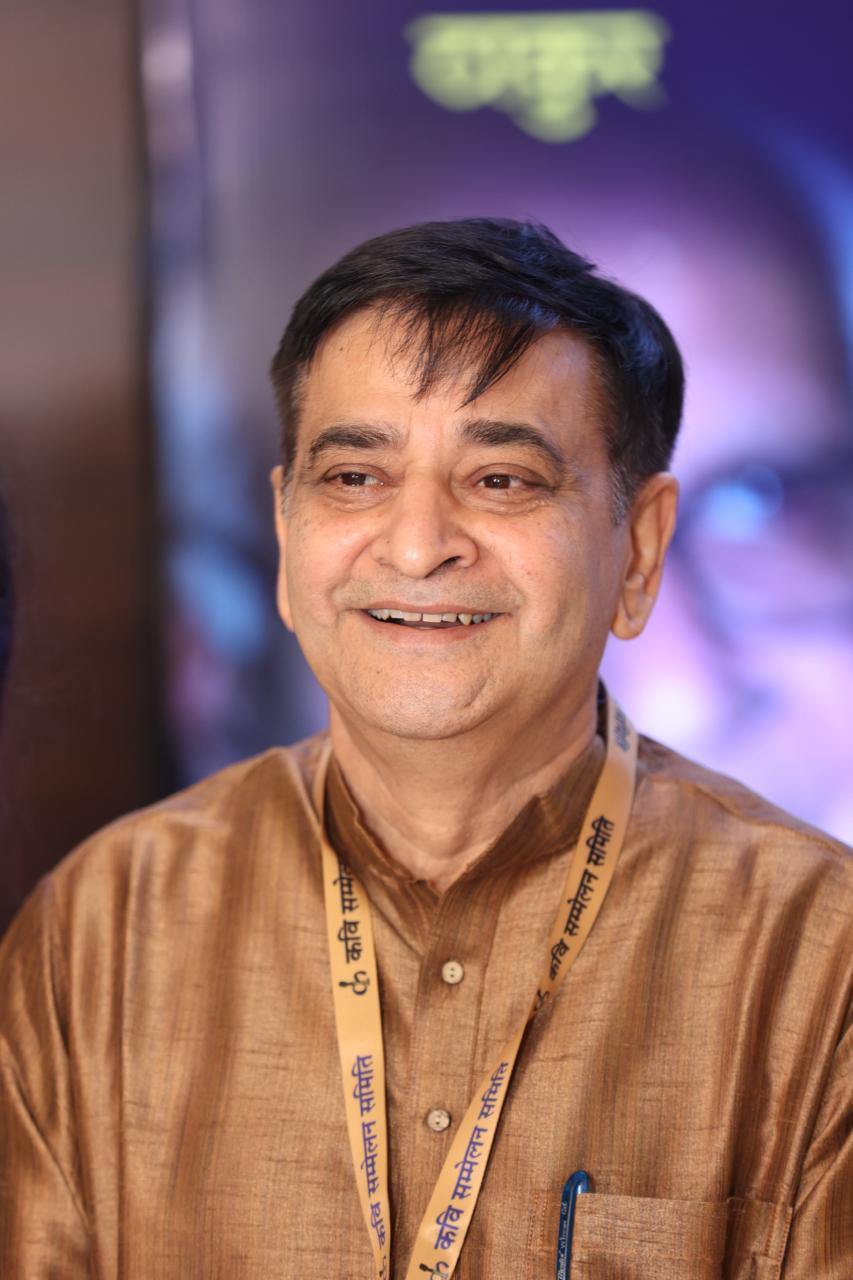
- Arun Gemini in 2024
- Born: 22 April 1959 (age 67); New Delhi, India
- Other name: Arun Kumar Gemini
- Education: Hansraj College, Delhi University
- Occupations: Writer, author, satirist
- Notable work: Filhaal Itna Hi Hai, Khoon Bolta Hai and Hasya Vyangya Ki Shikhar Kavitaaye
- Awards: Kaka Hathrasi Award by the Hindi Academy, Government of Delhi (2000); Haryana Gaurav Samman by the Government of Haryana (2014)

Arun Gemini (born 1959) is an Indian writer, poet and satirist and TV personality from Haryana, India. He was awarded Kaka Hathrasi Award for outstanding contribution in the literary field by the Hindi Academy, Government of Delhi in 2000. Arun Gemini was honored with Haryana Gaurav Samman (Award) by the Haryana Sahitya Akadami, Government of Haryana in July 2014.

He hosted various TV shows including Doordarshan's Dharti Ka Aanchal, Zee TV's Darasal, DD Metro's Taal Betal and Zee India's Yahi Hai Politics. He has also appeared on Wah! Wah! Kya Baat Hai! and Sony TV's The Kapil Sharma Show.

== Life and career ==
He was born on 22 April 1959, in New Delhi, India. He is the son of the famous poet and humorist Gemini Haryanvi. He has done a master's degree in Hindi from Hansraj College of Delhi University from where Gemini graduated in 1980. He did his first poetry recital as a child poet in 1971.

Arun Gemini has published many published poetry collections including Filhaal Itna Hi Hai, Khoon Bolta Hai and Hasya Vyangya Ki Shikhar Kavitaaye. In September 2012, he was one of the participants of SAB TV's comic poetry series Wah! Wah! Kya Baat Hai!. He was featured in the holi special episode of The Kapil Sharma Show in March 2019.

Gemini has hosted 26 episodes of the TV show, Dharti Ka Aanchal aired on Doordarshan. He also hosted 26 episodes of Hansgola, a comedy-poetry show, aired from NEPC TV. Some other TV shows that he hosted as a poet include Zee TV's Darasal, DD Metro's Taal Betal and Zee India's Yahi Hai Politics.

== Bibliography ==
- "Filhaal Itna Hi Hai", 2006 ISBN 978-8183615686
- "Khoon Bolta Hai"
- "Hasya Vyangya Ki Shikhar Kavitaaye", 20212 ISBN 978-8183615686

== Television ==
Show	TV Channel
Wah! Wah! Kya Baat Hai!	SAB TV
The Kapil Sharma Show	Sony TV
Darasal	Doordarshan
Taal Betal	DD Metro
Yahi Hai Politics	Zee India

== Awards and recognition ==
- He was honored with Haryana Gaurav Samman by the Haryana Sahitya Akadami, Government of Haryana in July 2014.
- He was honored with Pandit Jhabarmal Sharma Literary Award by the Rajasthan Brahmin Association in 2017.
- Arun Gemini was awarded the Kaka Hathrasi Award by the Hindi Academy, Government of Delhi in 2000.
- He is the recipient of Omprakash Aditya Samman in 2000.
- He was honored by President of India, Dr. Shankar Dayal Sharma in 1996 and Prime Minister Atal Bihari Vajpayee in 2002.
