= Gopal Prasad Vyas =

Indian poet (1915–2005)

Pandit Gopal Prasad Vyas
- गोपाल प्रसाद व्यास
- Born: 13 February 1915 (Note: according to "school records", 13 February 1914 according to "family records"); Mahmadpur, Mathura, Uttar Pradesh, India
- Died: 28 May 2005 (aged 90); Gulmohar Park, New Delhi, India
- Occupations: Poet, writer, columnist, journalist
- Spouse: Asharfi Devi
- Children: 6
- Relatives: Brajkishor Shastri (father); Chameli Devi (mother)
- Writing career
- Language: Hindi, Braj Bhasha
- Years active: 1937–2005
- Notable works: Ārām Karo, Patni Ko Parameshwar Māno, To Mein Kya Karoon, Khooni Hastākshar
- Notable awards: Padma Shri; Yash Bharti Award; Shalaka Award

Gopal Prasad Vyas (13 February 1915 – 28 May 2005) was an Indian poet, known for his humorous poems. His poems have been compiled into several books such as To Mein Kya Karoon, Ras Rasamrit, Maff Kijiye and Baat Baat Mein Baat. The story of his life has been documented in a biography, Bahuayami Jeevan Ke Dhani Pt Gopal Prasad Vyas, written by Santosh Matta, published by Prabhat Books in 2015. He was honoured by the Government of India in 1965, with the award of Padma Shri, the fourth highest Indian civilian award for his contributions to the field of literature.

== Biography ==
=== Early life ===
Gopal Prasad Vyas was born, according to his school certificate, on 13 February 1915 in Mahmadpur, near Gowardhan town, Mathura, Uttar Pradesh. He was educated in Mathura only up to Class 7. He was unable go for examination for that due to Indian Independence Movement.

=== Marriage ===
He was married to Asharfi Devi, daughter of Pratap Ji from Hindaun, Karauli District, Rajasthan in 1931.

=== Career ===
He was an editor in Dainik Hindustan, Sahitya Sandesh, Rajasthan Patrika, Sanmarg and Editor in Chief of Vikassheel Bharat. He was active in column writing from 1937 and till his death. He was the founder of Rastriya Kavi-Sammelan, an event held annually at the Red Fort.

=== Death ===
He died on Saturday, 28 May 2005 at his residence at B-52, Gulmohar Park, New Delhi.
