= Laugh India Laugh =

- Created by: Endemol
- Country of origin: India
- Original language: Hindi

Production
- Running time: 1 hour

Original release
- Network: Life OK
- Release: 15 July – 30 September 2012

Laugh India Laugh, a.k.a. L.I.L. is a stand-up comedy competition aired on Life OK channel. Top 18 Contestants from India and Pakistan are selected after auditions.

== Host ==
- Ishita Sarkar

== Judges ==
- Mika Singh
- Shekhar Suman
- Chunky Pandey

== Contestants ==
Akhtar Hindustani, Ali Javed, Amit Sharma, Ashok Nagar, Ayaz Samoo, Chirag Jain, Chirag Wadhwani, Dinesh Bawara, Dr Sanket, Kainaat Chouhan, Kesar Dev, KT, Laxman Nepali, Manoj Gujjar, Naseem Vicky, Nitesh Gupta, Rahul Rajasthani, Rajiv Goldy, Sardar Kamaal and Badar Khan, Sumedh Shinde, Sunil Vyas, Surindar Angural, Tahir Ali.

== Winner ==
Naseem Vicky from Pakistan won the Laugh India Laugh finale, which was telecast on 30 September 2012. KT from Mumbai is Runner up & Kesar Dev Marwari is 2nd Runner up.
