= Ashok Chakradhar =

Indian poet and writer (born 1951)

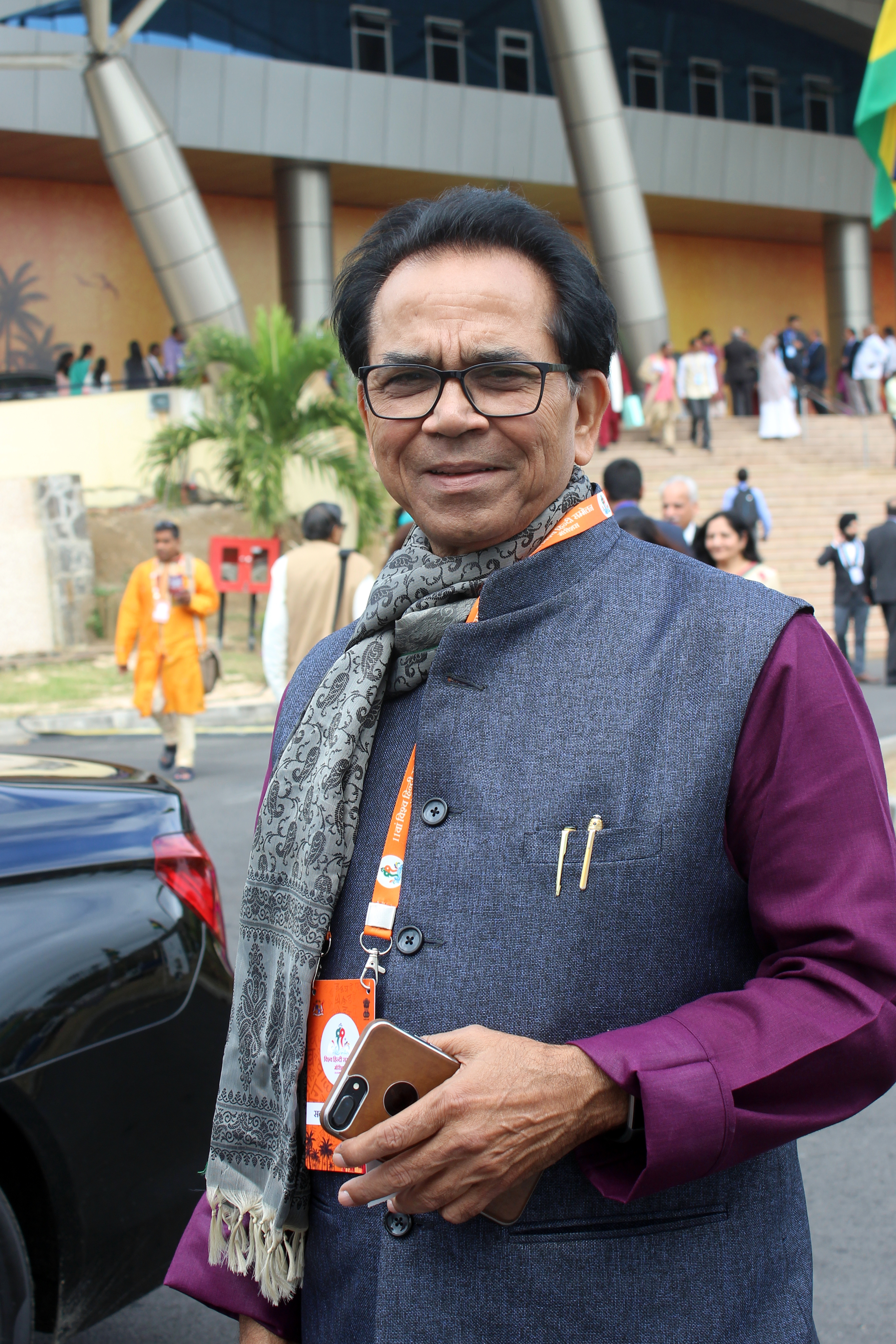
- Ashok Chakradhar in 11th WHC, Mauritius 2018
- Born: Ashok Sharma; 8 February 1951 (age 75); Khurja, Uttar Pradesh, India
- Occupations: Poet, essayist, literary critic, writer, director
- Known for: poetry and writing movie scripts
- Spouse: Bageshri Chakradhar
- Children: 2
- Awards: Padma Shri; Yash Bharti Award
- Website: chakradhar.in

Ashok Chakradhar (born 8 February 1951) is an Indian author, poet and former head of the department of Hindi at Jamia Millia Islamia (Central University). After serving for 29 years, he took voluntary retirement to focus on working towards the propagation and development of the Hindi language. In 2007 he became the Hindi coordinator at the Institute of Life Long Learning (ILLL) at the University of Delhi and in 2009 was appointed as the vice-chairman of Hindi Academy, Government of Delhi and as the vice-chairman of the Kendriya Hindi Shikshan Mandal, Ministry of HRD, Government of India. He is the son-in-law of Kaka Hathrasi.

== Career ==
Chakradhar is a retired professor of the Hindi Department at Jamia Millia Islamia University in Delhi. He has been actively associated with radio and television and has scripted a number of dramas, satires and poems for children. He has appeared in some television soaps, like "Chhoti Si Asha" with Sandhya Mridul on Sony TV, and has hosted the show Wah Wah!! for SAB TV. He has also acted in various television serials.

He took voluntary retirement from Jamia Milia Islamia in 2004.

== Film script writing ==
He wrote story of Jamuna Kinare (1984), a Braj Bhasha-language feature film which made by his father-in-law Kaka Hathrasi under the banner of Kaka Hathrasi Films Production and produced, directed and music composed by his brother-in-law and Kaka Hathrasi's son Dr. Laxmi Narayan Garg.

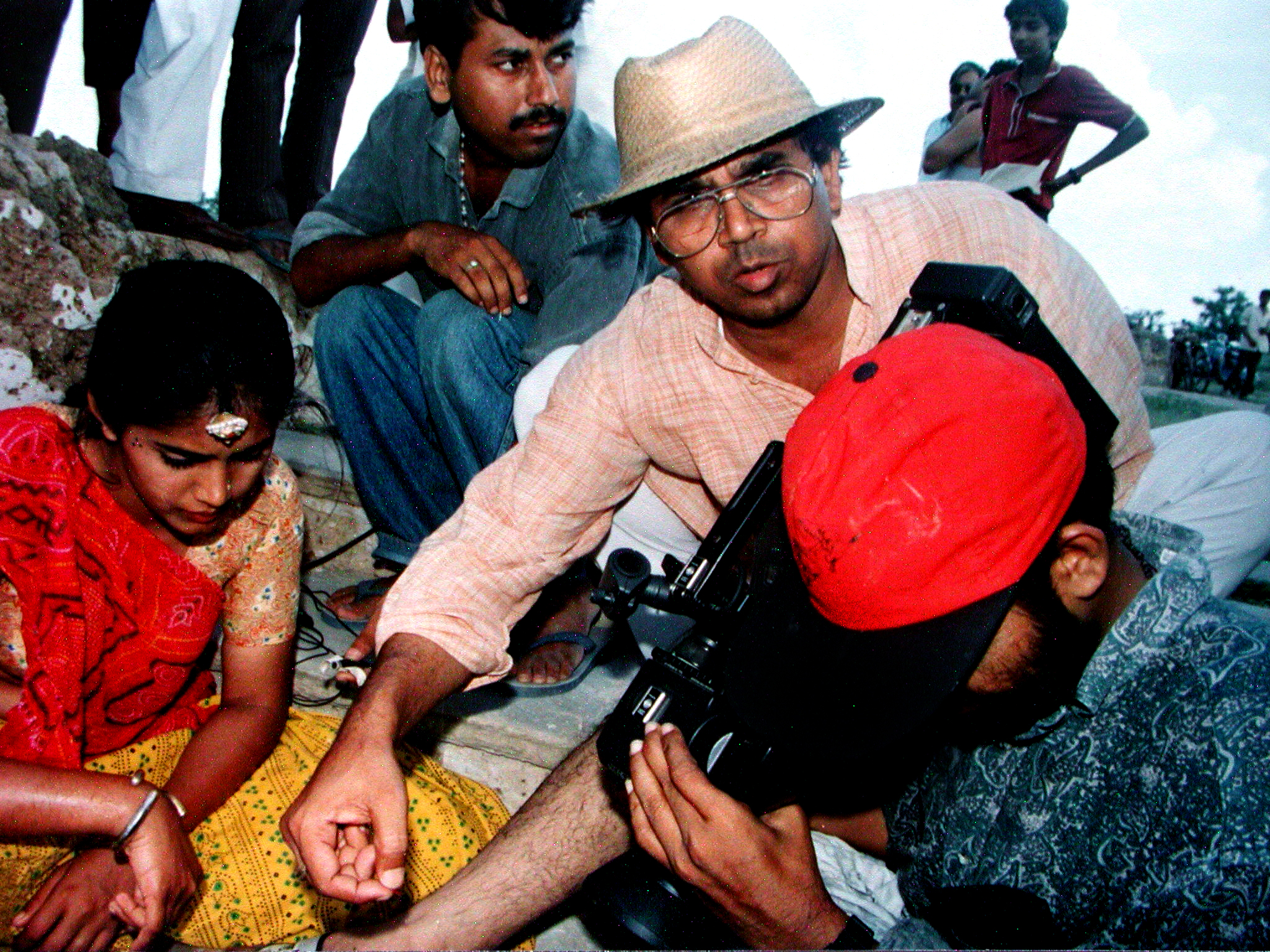
Ashok Chakradhar working for Gulabri

Films : Written and Directed (a)Telefilms 'Gulaabri', 'Jeet Gee Chhanno', 'Master Deepchand', 'Hai Musaddi', 'Jhoome Baalaa Jhoome Baalee', 'Teen Nazaare', ‘Bitiya’ (b)Teleserials 'Bhor Tarang', 'Dhhaaee Aakhar', 'Buaa Bhateejee', 'Bol Basanto' (c)Documentaries 'Pangu Giri Langhe', 'Goraa Hat Jaa', 'Saaksharataa Niketan', 'Vikaas Kee Lakeeren', 'Har Bachchaa Ho Kakshaa Paanch', ‘Us Or Hai Chhateraa’.

== Published works ==
=== Drama ===
'Rang Jamaa Lo', 'Bitiyaa Kee Sisakee', 'Bandariyaa Chalee Sasuraal', ‘Jab Rahaa na koee Chaaraa’, ‘Jaane kyaa Tapake’.

=== Children's literature ===
'koel Kaa Sitaar', 'Snehaa Kaa Sapnaa', 'Heeron Kee Choree', 'Ek Bagiyaa Main'

=== Adult educational literature ===
'Naee Dagar', 'Apaahij Kaun', 'Hamane Muhim Chalaaee', 'Bhaee Bhaut Achchhe', 'Badal Jaayengee Rekhaa', 'Taaumra Kaa Aaraam', 'Gharhe Oopar Handiyaa' 'To Kyaa Hotaa Jee', 'Aise Hotee Hai Shaadee', 'Rotee Ye Dhartee Dekho', 'Kab Talak Sahtee Rahen', 'Apnaa Haq Apnee Zameen', 'Kahaanee Jo Aankhon Se Bahee', 'Aur Police Par Bhee', 'Mazdooree Kee Raah', 'Jugat Karo Jeene Kee', 'Aur Kitne Din', Novel Manautee

== In other media ==
Chakradhar was a guest on 21 July 2019 episode of The Kapil Sharma Show along with Rahat Indori.

In September 2026, Chakradhar attended the fourth edition of the Gargi Manju Samman in Ranchi, Jharkhand, where he honored teachers for their contributions to education and society. He also appreciated the role of teachers in the society.

== Awards ==
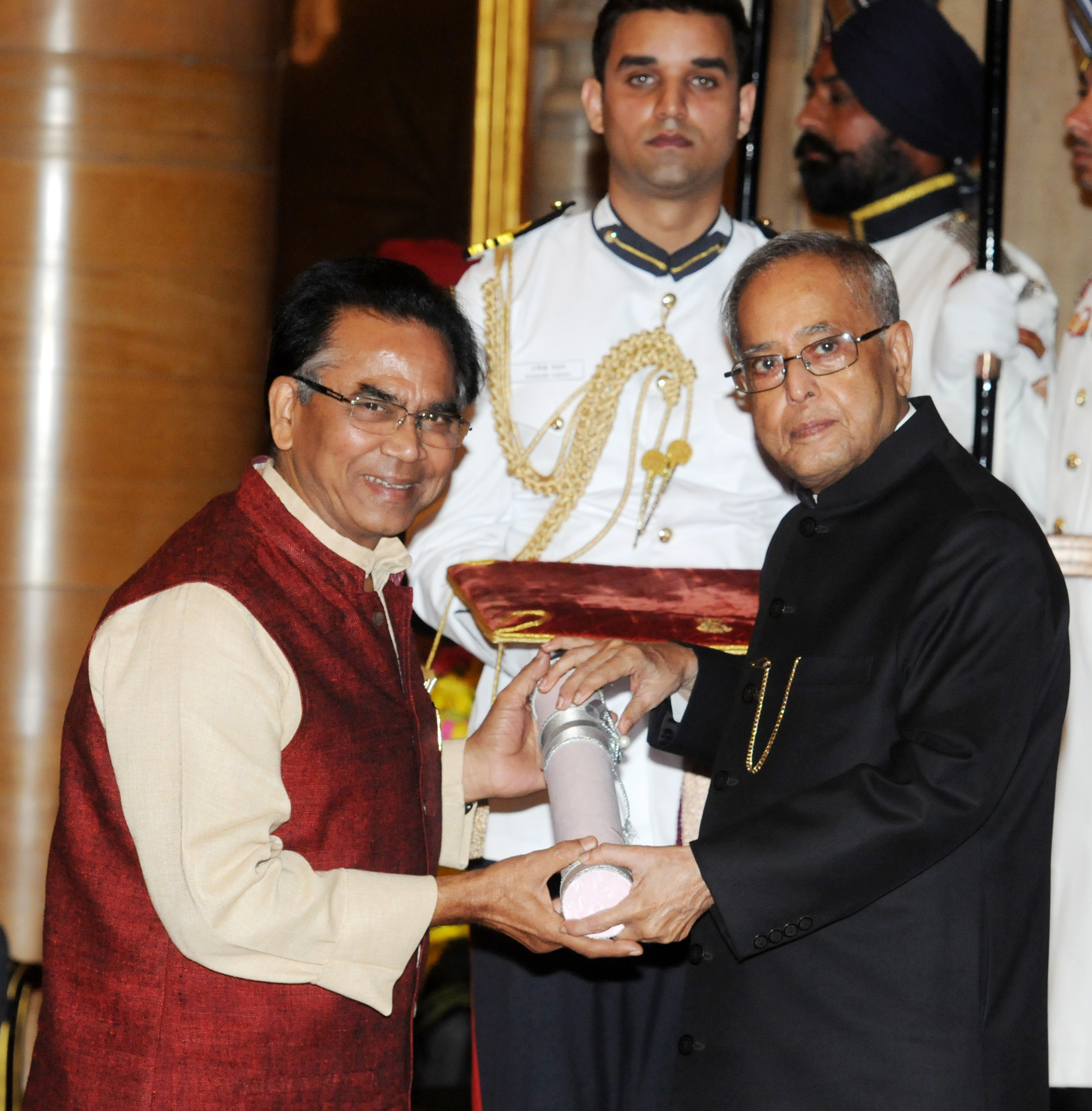
President of India facilitating Ashok Chakradhar with Padma Shri

- 2014: Padma Shri by Government of India for (Scriptwriting)
- 2025: Gyan Prodyogiki Samman by Hindi Academy (Delhi) for year 2022-23
