= Kamlesh Shukla (Socialist) =

Indian socialist leader

Kamlesh Shukla (1937 – 2015) was an Indian socialist leader. He served as Joint Secretary of Samyukta Socialist Party. He was founding editor of Socialist political weekly magazine Pratipaksh. During the Emergency, he was arrested in Baroda dynamite case along with George Fernandes. He also wrote anti-Emergency poetry.
