= Bhikhari Das =

Indian poet of the 18th century

Bhikaridas (c. 1703 – c. 1751) was an eminent Acharya, author, and poet of Hindi literature. While "Bhikaridas" was his full name, "Das" served as his surname or alias.

== Early life and patronage ==
Definite historical records regarding the life of Bhikaridas are not available; however, certain biographical details have been gathered from his text Kavyanirnaya. He was born to Krupaldas and belonged to the Kayastha community. Some scholars believe that his birthplace was Tongya or Teunga, a village located near Pratapgarh. Bhikaridas was patronized by Hindupatisinh, who was the younger brother of King Prithvipatisinh of Pratapgarh.

== Literary career and style ==
The period of his poetic compositions is considered to span from 1729 to 1751. His literary creations demonstrate a sharp intellect, rich imagination, and deep poetic skill. He was known for his ability to present complex and difficult subjects in a simple, accessible manner.

=== Major works ===
Bhikaridas authored several significant books, which include:

- Rasasaraansh (1734) – Features detailed descriptions of Nayak-Nayika bhed (the classifications of heroes and heroines), along with descriptions of sakhi (confidantes) and doot (messengers).
- 'Shabda-Naam-Prakash (1738)
- 'Chhandornav Pingal (1742)
- 'Kavyanirnaya (1746) – Comprises 25 chapters (Ullas) and 1,210 verses (Padya). It describes the nature of poetry and the power of words.
- 'Shringaranirnaya (1750) – His final major work, which also contains detailed themes of Nayak-Nayika bhed, sakhi, and doot.
- 'Vishnupuran Bhasha – An adaptation or translation of stories from the Vishnu Purana.
- 'Shatranjashatika – A specialized work that features descriptions of the game of chess.

=== Disputed works ===
There is a lack of consensus among literary scholars regarding the authorship of some texts attributed to Bhikaridas. Works whose attribution remains disputed include Chhanda Prakash, Bagbahar, Ragnirnaya, Braj Mahatmya Chandrika, Panth Parkhya, Varnanirnaya and Raghunath Natak.

== Death ==
The exact date, year, and location of Bhikaridas's death remain unconfirmed. Since he did not write any major work after completing Shringaranirnaya in 1750, it is inferred that he died a few years after its composition. According to the views of some scholars, his death occurred in Bhabhua, located in the Arrah district of Bihar.

== Legacy ==
A temple dedicated to Bhikaridas exists in Arrah today. Every year, a fair (yatra) is organized at this location on Vaishakh Shuddha Trayodashi, which is celebrated as his birth anniversary. During this festival, public recitations of his poetry are performed.
