= Krishna Kumar Sharma =

Krishna Kumar Sharma "Betaab" (1922 Muzaffarnagar – 2001 New Delhi) was a prominent activist in the Indian Independence Movement.

He was the President of the Allahabad University Student Association in 1942 when Mahatma Gandhi called for the Quit India Movement. He led the movement at Allahabad University and at Allahabad. He received injuries to his right eye during a scuffle with the British police and had permanent loss of vision.

He eventually graduated with a Masters in Law from Allahabad University, receiving a gold medal for academic excellence, and became a prominent poet and literary figure under the pen name "Betaab".

He had command over Persian, Urdu, English, Arabic, Hindi and Sanskrit; most of his literary work was in the form of Urdu Shers. He is widely renowned for his translation of the Hindu holy scripture, Bhagvad Geeta, from Sanskrit to Arabic, English and Persian. He wrote the lyrics for a few Bollywood movie songs in the 1950s. He was a close friend of Harivanshrai Bachchan, Majrooh Sultanpuri and Feroze Gandhi.

He was Honored as "Proud Past Alumni" in the list of 42 members, from "Allahabad University Alumni Association", Ghaziabad, along with the likes of Dr. Shankar Dayal Sharma, Shri Vishwanath Pratap Singh, Shri Harivansh Rai Bachchan and Acharya Narendra Dev.
