= Tara Singh (author) =

Indian writer and poet (born 1952)

Dr. Srimati Tara Singh
- Born: 10 October 1952 (age 73)
- Citizenship: Indian
- Education: Kolkata college
- Occupations: Poet, writer and author
- Spouse: Dr. Brahmdeo Prasad Singh
- Children: Two sons
- Website: swargvibha.com

Srimati Tara Singh (born 10 October 1952) is an Indian writer and poet who writes in Hindi. Since childhood she has taken a special interest in dance and music and in writing poems. She was awarded several prizes and letter of appreciation for her poems and performances in literary debates during school and college career.

== Biography ==
After completing her graduation in Arts, she devoted her time to serving Hindi literature. Her writings received recognition by Star TV shows and were regularly published in newspapers and magazines. Two of her poetry books, received wide praise. Subsequent publications of books on family and social issues, personal and social delicacies, philosophy of life and realities, birth and death cycles, etc. made her a central figure in Hindi literature. She has received a total of 259 awards from national and international organizations.

She married the Kolkata college Head of Department of Chemistry.

== Literary works ==
No. of books published - 59 namely: (i) Poetry Books – 22 (ii) Gazal Books – 8 (iii) Story book − 14 (iv) Novel − 12 (v) Essay Books - 2 (vi) Children's books - 1 Also her 115 joint-poetry collections are already published. Her articles are published on 29 popular Hindi websites including swargvibha and one song was selected as title song of a Hindi movie 'SIPAIJI' released in 2008. Her 8 Audio Books (Novel -2, Story Books -3, Poetry Books -3) are being broadcast continuously by Kuku FM and are drawing excellent response from listeners and literary lovers.

== Present engagement ==
She is the founder president of the Hindi website Swargvibha and Chief Editor of swargvibha online quarterly magazine, which has numerous collections & gives away Swargvibha Tara award to promising Hindi writers/ journalists every year. She is the working president of the Sahityik, Sanskritik and Kala Sangam Academy, Pratapgarh (U.P.). She takes keen interest in writing poems, gazals, stories, novels and filmy songs.
