= Jagdish Chaturvedi (writer) =

Indian poet

- Born: 9 January 1932; Gwalior Madhya Pradesh, India
- Died: 2015 (aged 82–83); Delhi, India
- Occupations: Writer; Poet
- Awards: Padma Shri; Mahakavi Bihari Award

Jagdish Chaturvedi was an Indian poet of Hindi literature.

== Early life ==
He was born on 15 August 1929, at Gwalior in the state of Madhya Pradesh and after securing his master's degree in Philosophy, started his career by joining Madhav College, Ujjain as a member of its faculty. Later, worked in All India Radio and the Central Hindi Directorate as an editor. He published several books of prose and poetry and also translated many books into the Hindi language. The Government of India awarded him the fourth highest civilian honour of the Padma Shri in 2003. He died at his Delhi residence in 2015.
