= Maithilisharan Gupt =

Indian Poet (1886-1964)

Dr Maithilisharan Gupt
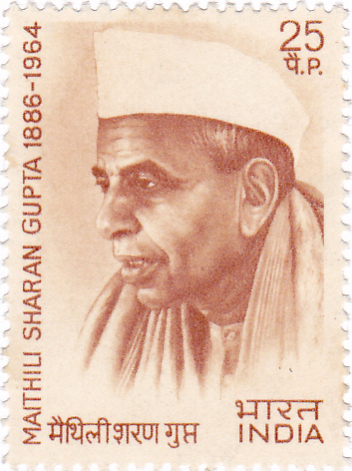
- Born: 3 August 1886; Chirgaon, North-Western Provinces, British India
- Died: 12 December 1964 (aged 78); India
- Education: Macdonal High School, Jhansi; Banaras Hindu University
- Occupations: Poet, politician, dramatist, translator
- Spouse: Sarju Devi (Jiya)
- Children: Urmila Charan Gupt
- Relatives: Mr Saurabh Gupta (Grandson) Dr Vaibhav Gupta (Grandson)
- Writing career
- Notable works: Bharat Bharti, Saket
- Notable awards: Padma Bhushan (1954)
- Movement: Indian Nationalist Movement

Member of Parliament, Rajya Sabha (Nominated)
- In office 3 April 1952 – 2 April 1964

Dr Maithilisharan Gupt (3 August 1886 – 12 December 1964) was one of the most important modern Hindi poets. He is considered one among the pioneers of Khari Boli (plain dialect) poetry and wrote in Khari Boli dialect, at a time when most Hindi poets favoured the use of Braj Bhasha dialect. He was a recipient of the third highest (then second highest) Indian civilian honour of Padma Bhushan. For his book Bharat-Bharati (1912), widely quoted during India's freedom struggle, he was given the title of Rashtra Kavi by Mahatma Gandhi.

In 1956, Rashtrakavi Maithili Sharan Gupt Abhinandan Samiti Calcutta published 'Abhinandan Granth', a comprehensive 1000-page document in honour of his life and work.

His family now runs the RMSG Group of Institutions in Chirgaon, promoting his ideals of empowering education, especially among girls.

== Early life ==
He was born in Chirgaon, Jhansi in Uttar Pradesh in the Kankane clan of the Gahoi Bania community in a family that was once a wealthy zamindar family, but the wealth was lost by the time he was born. His father's name was Seth Ramcharan Gupta and his mother's name was Kashibai. Both his father and his brother Shearamsharan Gupta were prominent poets. He disliked school as a child, so his father arranged for his education at their home. As a child, Gupt studied Sanskrit, English and Bengali. Mahavir Prasad Dwivedi was his mentor. He married in 1895.

== Literary works ==
Gupt entered the world of Hindi literature by writing poems in various magazines, including Saraswati. In 1909, his first major work, Rang mein Bhang was published by Indian Press. With Bharat Bharati, his nationalist poems became popular among Indians, who were struggling for independence. Most of his poems revolve around plots from Ramayana, Mahabharata, Buddhist stories and the lives of famous religious leaders. His famous work Saket revolves around Urmila, wife of Lakshmana, from Ramayana, while another of his works Yashodhara revolves around Yashodhara, the wife of Gautama Buddha.

प्राण न पागल हो तुम यों, पृथ्वी पर वह प्रेम कहाँ..

मोहमयी छलना भर है, भटको न अहो अब और यहाँ..

ऊपर को निरखो अब तो बस मिलता है चिरमेल वहाँ..

=== Creative style ===
His works are based along patriotic themes, among others poets such as Ramdhari Singh Dinkar and Makhanalal Chaturvedi. His poetry is characterized by non-rhyming couplets in Khadi Boli. Although the couplet structure is non rhyming, the prominent use of alliterations lends a rhythmic backdrop due to the rhythmic alterations between vowels and consonants. He was a religious man, and this can be seen in his works.

=== Major works ===
Poetry:

- Saket(1931)
- Rang mein Bhang(1909)
- Matrubhumi
- Bharat-Bharati(1912)
- Jayadrath Vadh(1910)
- Vikat Bhat
- Plassey ka Yuddha
- Gurukul
- Kisan
- Panchavati(1925)
- Nirjhar
- Yashodhara(1932)
- Manushyata
- Kinaro ka khel
- Dvapar(1936)
- Anagh(1928)

== Political career ==
After India got independence in 1947, he was also made an honorary member of the Rajya Sabha, where he used poetry to put his opinions before the other members. He remained a member of the Rajya Sabha till his death in 1964. He was awarded Padma Bhushan in 1954.

== See also ==
- List of Hindi-language poets
