= Koduram Dalit =

Indian poet

- Born: 5 March 1910
- Died: 28 September 1967 (aged 57)
- Occupation: Indian poet

Koduram Dalit (5 March 1910 – 28 September 1967) was an Indian poet in Hindi and Chhattisgarhi languages.

Madhya Pradesh.

ukhaay are two of his popular poem collections.

Nawagarh (Bemetara, Chhattisgarh) is named after him - Koduram Dalit Mahavidyala.During the freedom struggle, both poets and freedom fighters who followed Gandhian ideology composed numerous poems, novels, and dramas on the independence of the country. One such poet was Jankavi Koduram Dalit, who was born on 5 March 1910 in the village of Tikri (Arjunda), located in the district of Durg now in Balod district. His father, Ram Bharosa, was an agriculturist, and Koduram spent his childhood among agricultural laborers in a rural environment. He received his early education at Arjunda Middle School.

He embraced the Gandhian ideology and possessed great command over both the Hindi and Chhattisgarhi languages. He was a dedicated follower of Mahatma Gandhi's principles. Most of his poems were written in Chhattisgarhi and contributed to the literature of the freedom movement.

Alongside being a poet, he also worked as a primary school teacher. He would travel from village to village with a group of his students, using couplets and poems to instill a sense of patriotism among the people and encourage the people to fight for the nation. Some poems of Kaduram Dalit:

Raootnaachakedohe –
