= Kumar Vikal =

- Born: Kumar Vikal; 1935; Punjab, India
- Died: 1997 (aged 61–62); Chandigarh, India
- Citizenship: Indian
- Occupations: Panjab University, secretarial job
- Writing career
- Language: Hindi
- Genre: Free verse Poetry
- Subject: Radical Social Change

Kumar Vikal (1935–1997) was a prominent poet of Hindi language. He belonged to Punjab, India. He was most popular during the 1970s to 1990s, the period which coincides with rise and fall of Naxalite and militant movements in Punjab. His poetry expressed the problems of oppressed and marginalized sections of the society. Secular and humanitarian content of his poetry helped in building communal harmony during the period when the Punjab region was facing Hindu-Sikh communal tension during 1980–1990. His poetry reflect a tinge of Punjabiat also which is regarded by critics as similar to Krishna Sobti, another well known Hindi writer from Punjab.

== Works ==
- Ek Choti Si Ladai, (Hindi-एक छोटी सी लड़ाई)
- Rang Khatre Mai Hain, (Hindi-रंग ख़तरे में हैं)
- Nirupma Dutt Mai Bahut Udas Hoon, (Hindi- निरुपमा दत्त मैं बहुत उदास हूँ)
