= Raghuvir Sharan Mitra =

Hindi writer

- Born: 1919; India
- Died: 1996 (aged 76–77); Meerut, Uttar Pradesh, India
- Occupation: Hindi writer
- Awards: Padma Shri

Raghuvir Sharan Mitra (1919–1996) was an Indian poet, novelist and essayist of Hindi literature. He is the author of poem anthologies such as Jeevan ke Panne, Bhāratodaya and Sindhu Sarovara, novels like Rakt Surya and Aag aur Paani, and essays such as Kāi aura Kamala and Bhūmijā.

== Awards ==
The Government of India awarded him the fourth highest Indian civilian honour of Padma Shri in 1983.

== See also ==
- Hindi literature
