= Kunwar Bechain =

Indian poet and novelist (1942–2021)

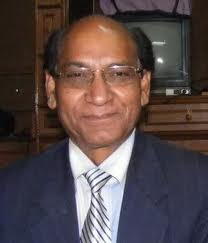
- Born: Kunwar Bahadur Saxena; 1 July 1942; Umri, Moradabad, Uttar Pradesh, India
- Died: 29 April 2021 (aged 78); Noida, Uttar Pradesh, India
- Education: M.A in Hindi, Ph.D.
- Occupations: Poet, Professor
- Writing career
- Language: Hindi
- Notable awards: Kavishala Lifetime Achievement Award (2020)

Kunwar Bechain (1 July 1942 – 29 April 2021) was a Hindi poet of India. He was a resident of Ghaziabad, Uttar Pradesh.

== Biography ==
Dr. Bechain was born in village Umri, District Moradabad, Uttar Pradesh on 1 July 1942. His actual name was Dr. Kunwar Bahadur Saxena. He spent his early years in Chandousi, Uttar Pradesh. He holds an M.A in Hindi and Ph.D. He worked as head of the Hindi department in MMH College, Ghaziabad. He died on 29 April 2021 due to COVID-19 in Noida during the COVID-19 pandemic in Uttar Pradesh. His great works in Hindi Literature have forced the Indian Government to name a road in Ghaziabad, Uttar Pradesh on his name.

He has appeared on numerous poetry events all across the country (like kavi-sammelans). He also appeared on numerous episodes on SAB TV's poetry show Wah! Wah! Kya Baat Hai!. He also received Kavishala Lifetime Achievement Award - 2020.

He was also the PhD advisor of another famous Indian Hindi poet Dr. Kumar Vishwas.
