= Prabhakiran Jain =

Indian writer (born 1963)

Dr. Prabhakiran Jain
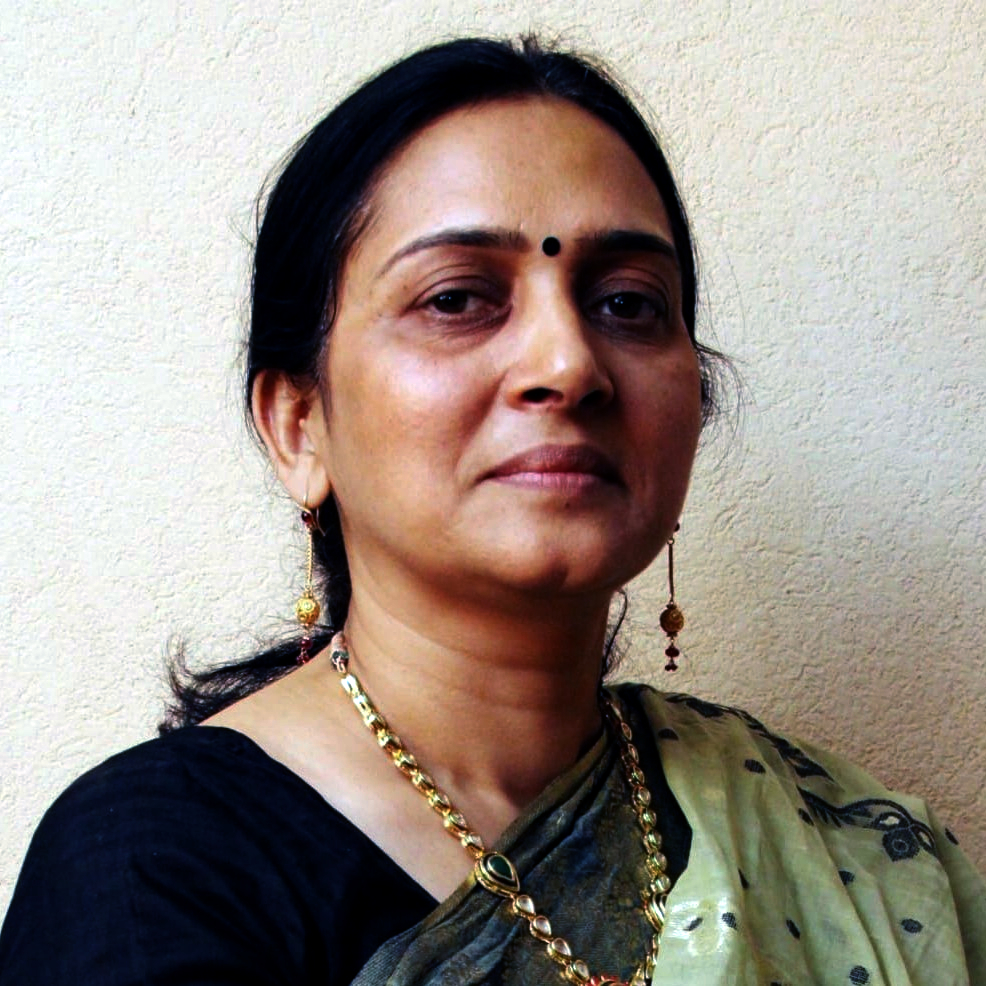
- Born: 30 October 1963 (age 62); Herbertpur, Uttarakhand, India
- Occupations: Poet, Philanthropist
- Writing career
- Period: 1979–present
- Genres: Children's literature, satire, young adult fiction, Nonfiction
- Notable works: Manonayan (2013), Katha Sarita Katha Sagar (2007), Gommateshwar Bahubali (2018), Bharatnama - Bharat Ka Naamkaran (2021), Girnar Satya Aur Tathya (2021)
- Website: prabhakiranjain.com

Dr. Prabhakiran Jain (born 1963) is a poet and author.

== Biography ==
Jain has a Ph.D. in Political Science and has worked extensively in creating awareness about contribution of Nominated Members of Rajya Sabha.

Jain has been featured on TV Channels including Doordarshan Network, NDTV, Star Plus, SAB TV, Sony Entertainment Television, India TV, Sudarshan TV, Sahara TV, Focus TV, Mahua TV, Total TV, as well as on Radio networks in various countries including India, Australia & New Zealand.

Through the early 2000s, Jain represented the Indian Council For Cultural Relations, Government of India in United Kingdom and participated in literary events in the United States of America, Australia and South Africa etc.

Jain runs Prem Shanti Sahitya Sanskriti Sansthan, a non-profit organization, to promote literary releases. Jain currently serves as the joint secretary of the Akhil Bhartvarshiya Digamber Jain Parishad and is a contributing editor for Naya Gyanodaya, a Bharatiya Jnanpith publication.

== Bibliography ==
=== Children's literature ===
==== Poetry ====
- Rang Birange Balloon (रंग-बिरंगे बैलून) (1995) ISBN 9788170780533
- Geet Khilone (गीत खिलौने) (2002)
- Chahak Bhi Jaroori Mehak Bhi Jaroori (चहक भी ज़रूरी महक भी ज़रूरी) (2004) (with Dr Sherjung Garg)
- Gobar Banam Gobardhan (गोबर बनाम गोबर्धन) ISBN 9788188911332
- Ibanbatoota Ka Joota (इब्नबतूता का जूता) (2015) ISBN 9789326354394
- Chal Meri Dholaki (चल मेरी ढोलकी) (2015) ISBN 9789326354400

==== Storybooks ====
- Anath Kisaan (अनाथ किसान)
- Jamalo Ka Chura (जमालो का छुरा)
- Katha Sarita Katha Sagar (कथासरिता कथासागर) (2007)

==== Biographies ====
- Samrat Ashok (सम्राट अशोक) (2017) ISBN 9789326355131
- Chanakya (चाणक्य) (2017) ISBN 9789326355148
- Sarvepalli Radhakrishnan (सर्वपल्ली राधाकृष्णन) (2017) ISBN 9789326355117
- Mahatma Gandhi (महात्मा गाँधी) (2017) ISBN 9789326355124

=== Indology ===
- Vaishali Ke Mahavir (वैशाली के महावीर) (2003; in Hindi and English) (translated into English by Amarendra Khatua) ISBN 9789326352857
- Chaitanya Mahaprabhu (चैतन्य महाप्रभु) (2017) ISBN 9789326355155
- Bhagwan Mahaveer (भगवान महावीर) (2017) ISBN 9789326355162
- Shri Ram (श्रीराम) (2017) ISBN 9789326355179
- Gommateshwar Bahubali (गोम्मटेश्वर बाहुबली) (2018; in Hindi and English) (translated into English by Sahu Akhilesh Jain) ISBN 9789326355667

=== Poetry ===
- Nagfani Sadabahar Hai (नागफनी सदाबहार है) (1997)
- Dus Lakshan (दस लक्षण)

=== Research works ===
- Manonayan: Rajya Sabha ke Manoneet Sadasya (मनोनयन: राज्यसभा के मनोनीत सदस्य) (2013)
- Bharatnama: Bharat Ka Naamkaran (भारतनामा: भारत का नामकरण) (2021) ISBN 9789390659586
- Girnar Satya Aur Tathya (गिरनार : सत्य और तथ्य) (2025) ISBN 9789394212923

=== Editorial works ===
- Vaishalik Ki Chhaya Mein (वैशालिक की छाया में) (2005) (with Rajesh Jain)
- Veer (वीर) (magazine, 1989–2017)
