= Susmita Basu Majumdar =

Indian historian

Susmita Basu Majumdar is an Indian historian, epigraphist and numismatist. She is a professor in the Department of Ancient Indian History at the University of Calcutta. With her nom-de-plume Adaa, she is a poet in the Hindi and Urdu languages, and a musician.

== Life ==
Susmita Basu Majumdar obtained a bachelor's degree from Lady Brabourne College, followed by master's and doctoral degrees from the University of Calcutta.

== Research ==
=== Ashokan Circuit ===
In 1986, the roof of the Chandrala Parameshwari Temple at Sannati, Karnataka collapsed, revealing Brahmi inscriptions on the stone base of the deity. These comprised edicts 1 and 2 and rock edicts 12 and 14 of Ashoka, revealing Sannati as an important Buddhist shrine from the Mauryan period. Calcutta University began a project to document the Ashokan circuit in Karnataka. Majumdar was heading the project in 2016 when the broken original idol of Mahakali was found outside the temple walls, resulting in the restoration of the idol.

Majumdar published booklets on the Ashokan circuit (The Mauryans in Karnataka) and a trilingual English-Pali-Kannada dictionary.

=== Numismatics and epigraphy ===
Majumdar investigated the shaping of trade by foreign and domestic currencies on the Malabar coast. Contrasting the prevalence of Roman copper coins in Chola and Pandya territories with the preponderance of Roman silver coins (and lack of copper coins) in Chera territories, she showed that this was likely due to the Cheras being the regional power in Kerala, issuing copper coins. She introduced a methodology to examine the commerce between Rome and India based on the coinage unearthed at Pattanam.

=== Kushan coinage in Bengal ===
A cache of 83 coins was found in East Midnapore by Aurobindo Maity, a retired high school teacher attempting to locate and archive informal relics in the region. These were identified as Kushan coins from the periods of Kanishka and Huvishka, as part of Majumdar's research.

== Music and poetry ==
Majumdar has collaborated with santoor maestro Pandit Sandip Chatterjee in an album titled Lyrical Fusion, providing lyrics in Urdu as well as vocals.

Her book Triangulum: Trilingual poetry comprising her poetry in Urdu was published in 2015.

== Selected works ==
=== Articles ===
- Susmita Basu Majumdar (2017). "State formation and religious processes in the north–south corridor of Chhattisgarh (from first century bc to eighth century ad)". Studies in People's History. 4 (2): 119–129. doi:10.1177/2348448917725849. S2CID 134435005.
- Susmita Basu Majumdar (2010). "'Mausula' – A Lesser Tradition? Or A Lesser Known Saiva Tradition'". Journal of Ancient Indian History. XXVI.
- Susmita Basu Majumdar (2009). "Typological progression in the Numismatic art: a case study of Bengal gold coinage". Journal of Bengal Art. 13.
- Susmita Basu Majumdar; Sayantani Pal (2008). "Kushana Coins and their impact on Monetary tradition of Bengal". Journal of the Numismatic Society of Calcutta.
- Susmita Basu Majumdar (2003). "Tracing the Religio-Specific Traits in the Saiva Sculptures of South Kosala". Proceedings of the Indian History Congress. 64: 277–285. JSTOR 44145470.
- Susmita Basu Majumdar (2001). "Taharudra, a hitherto unknown ruler of Malhar (South Kosala)". Proceedings of the Indian History Congress, 61st Session.
- Susmita Basu Majumdar (1999). "Chatagarh Memorial Stone Inscriptions". The Journal of the Asiatic Society. XLI (3). Kolkata.

=== Books ===
- Susmita Basu Majumdar (2014). Kalighat Hoard: The First Gupta Coin Hoard from India. Mira's Books. ISBN 978-9351567264.
- Susmita Basu Majumdar; Nayana Sharma Mukherjee (2013). Essays on the History of Medicine. Indian Institute of Research in Numismatic Studies. ISBN 978-8186786338.
- Suchandra Ghosh; Sudipa R. Bandyopadhyaya; Susmita Basu Majumdar; Sayantani Pal, eds. (2011). Revisiting Early India, Essays in Honour of D.C.Sircar. R.N. Bhattacharya. ISBN 978-8187661733.

=== Music and poetry ===
- Susmita Basu Majumdar; Rajib Chakraborty; Sushmita Gupta (2015). Triangulum: Trilingual poetry. Manohar. ISBN 978-9350981122.
- Susmita Basu Majumdar (2017). Lyrical Fusion (Media notes). Sandip Chatterjee.
