= Balswaroop Raahi =

- Born: 16 May 1936 (age 88); Timarpur New Delhi
- Occupation(s): Poet, lyricist

Balswaroop Raahi is a Hindi poet and lyricist from India. She was born in Village Timarpur New Delhi on 4 May 1936. She was the best known for his Geet and Ghazal. He has written many songs for Bollywood. He is a resident of Model Town, New Delhi. He worked as Head of the Hindi department at Delhi University.

== Books ==
- Mera roop tumhara darpan
- Jo nitant meri hai
- Raag viraag (Hindi opera based on Chitralekha)
- Suraj ka rath
- Raahi ko samjhaye kaun
- Dadi amma mujhe batao
- Hum sab aage niklenge
- Gaal bane gubbare
