= Shambhunath Singh =

Hindi writer and poet

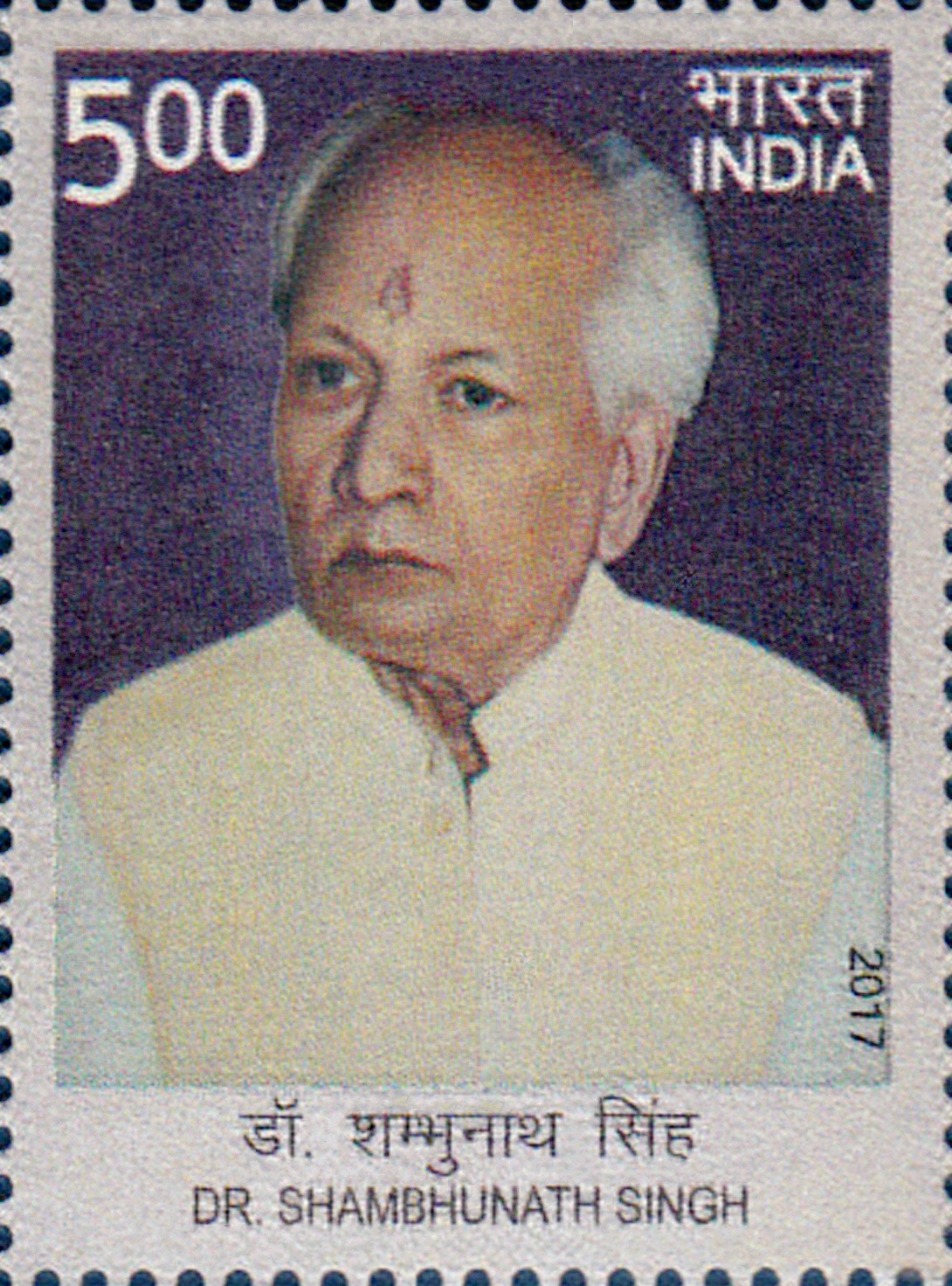
Singh on a 2017 stamp of India

Shambhunath Singh (17 June 1916 – 3 September 1991) was a Hindi writer, freedom fighter, poet and social worker. He is especially celebrated for composing the Kulgeet (University Anthem) of MGKVP, which is a symbol of the institution’s cultural and philosophical ethos.

== Early life ==
He was born in Rawatpar village, Deoria district, Uttar Pradesh, India. He did his M.A. in Hindi, earned a Doctoral degree, and worked as a teacher at Mahatma Gandhi Kashi Vidyapith, and finally retired as Professor and Head of the Hindi Department, Sampurnanand Sanskrit Vishwavidyalaya, Varanasi.

Shambhunath Singh was a lyric poet, though he has also written a few plays and literary criticism. He has written a book-length reevaluation of the book 'Chhayavada'. He started the Navageet movement with publishing his collection of poems Divalok. In this book, despair, frustration and desire for beauty are the major themes. Later he shifted to the holy city of Varanasi with his late wife Prabhavati Singh.

He has a special place in the history of Hindi poetry. His poems show new intellectual consciousness. Portrayal of the modern inconsistency in the human life is the unique feature of his writings.

A Non-Governmental Organization working for the deprived and marginalized peoples of the community is named after him. The name of the organization is Dr. Shambhunath Singh Research Foundation (SRF).

== Selected works ==
- Samay ki shila par
- Jaha dard neela hai
- Harijan geet (on Dalits)
- Divalok
- Rup rashmi (1946)
- Chāyāloka (1970)
- Udayācala (1970)
- Navgeet Dashak (1982)
- Hindī ālocanā ke jyoti-stambha (1972)
