= Laxminarayan Payodhi =

Indian poet, writer (born 1957)

- Born: 23 March 1957 (age 69) Ankisa village, Maharashtra, India

Laxminarayan Payodhi (born 23 March 1957) is an Indian poet, writer, editor, and language researcher known for his contributions to Hindi literature.

== Early life and education ==
Laxminarayan Payodhi was born on 23 March 1957 in Ankisa village, Maharashtra, India. He was raised in Bhopalpatnam, in present-day Bijapur district of Chhattisgarh. He was born into a Telugu-speaking family and received his early education in Bhopalpatnam.

Payodhi later pursued higher studies in Jagdalpur and Raipur. He obtained postgraduate degrees in Hindi Literature and Sociology from Ravishankar University, Raipur. During his student years, he developed an interest in Indian philosophy, Vedic literature, and classical epics.

His literary and philosophical influences include Ramakrishna Paramhansa, Swami Vivekananda, Adi Shankaracharya, and Hindi poet Suryakant Tripathi 'Nirala'.

== Career ==
Payodhi has worked as a poet, novelist, short-story writer, playwright, critic, editor, and researcher. Following the publication of his early works, he established himself in contemporary Hindi literature through poetry, ghazals, children's literature, and research publications. He has been associated with documentation and research on tribal languages and cultures, particularly those of the Gond, Bhil, and Korku communities. He served as editor of Samajh Jharokha, a government magazine for children, and has also edited publications including Vimarsh, Sampark, Sandhaan, and research bulletins published by the Tribal Research and Development Institute, Madhya Pradesh.

=== Research and tribal languages ===
Payodhi has contributed to the documentation and preservation of tribal languages and cultures in central India. His work includes the compilation of dictionaries for Gondi, Bhili, and Korku languages, as well as publications on the cultural traditions of tribal communities in Madhya Pradesh.

Payodhi has also written extensively on the customs, traditions, and social practices of tribal communities, including studies relating to Gond, Bhil, and Korku societies.

== Literary works ==
=== Poetry ===
- Somaru (1992; revised editions 1997 and 2005)
- Sambandhon Ke Aavej Mein (1992)
- Aakhetakhon Ke Viruddh (1997)
- Ant Mein Bachi Kavita (2000)
- Gamak (Ghazals, 2002)
- Harshit Hai Brahmand (Lyrics, 2003–2004)
- Kandeel Mein Suraj (Ghazals, 2005)
- Punarapi (Selected Poems, 2005)
- Chuppiyon Ka Bayaan (Ghazals, 2008)
- Andhere Ke Paar (Ghazals, 2011)
- Chintalnaar Se Chintalnaar Tak (Poems, 2012)
- Lamjhana (Poems, 2018)
- Sugandhon Ka Safar (2015)
- Ujaalon Ki Talaash (2017)
- Samay Ka Naad (2019)
- Khayalon Ki Dhoop (2018)
- Shabd Ke Aarpaar (2020)

=== Drama ===
- Gundadhoor (Poetic drama, 2018)

=== Research publications ===
- Gondi–Hindi Shabd Kosh (2006)
- Bhili–Hindi Shabd Kosh (2007)
- Korku–Hindi Shabd Kosh (2007)
- Gond Janjati Ka Sanskratik Pralekh (2006)
- Janjatiya Godna: Shrungar Aur Upchaar (2012)
- Bhil Janjati Samuh Ke Saanskritik Ayaam (2015)
- Dhangana (Coffee-table book on Baiga painting, 2017)
- Lamjhana (Poetic drama, 2018). The work was featured during the National Tribal Literature Festival, where it was presented as a dramatic portrayal of a tribal love story.

=== Children's literature ===
Payodhi has authored several works of children's literature, including novels, poetry collections, drama, and educational books on tribal culture.

- Vanvaasi Krantiveer (1990)
- Thibaru (Novel, 1992)
- Languron Ke Desh Mein (1996)
- Titali Pari (Drama, 1998)
- Ababeel Ki Saheli (2000)
- Ghonsala Bola (2005)
- Adivasi Kranti Nayak (2005)
- Suraj Ke Desh Mein (Novel, 2005)
- Uttar Ban Jayen (Poems, 2005)
- Uunche Rakhen Iraade (Poems, 2005)
- Adivasi Bachchon Ke Khel (Encyclopedia on tribal games, two volumes, 2005)

=== Research books ===
- Janjatiya Godna: Shrungar aur upchaar (2012)
- Bhil Janaati Samuh Ke Saanskritik Aayaam (Culture of Bhil Tribal Group, 2015)
- Dhangana (coffee table book on Baigapainting, 2017)

== Honors and awards ==
- Kamleshwar Award from the Dushyant Museum
- Jagdish Guru Literary Award (2024)

The poetic drama Lamjhana was featured during the National Tribal Literature Festival.
