= Indra Bahadur Khare =

Indian Hindi-language poet (1922–1953)

- Born: 16 December 1922; Gadarwara, India
- Died: 13 April 1953 (aged 30); Prayag, India
- Education: Hitkarini City College, Nagpur University, Robertson College Jabalpur
- Occupations: Poet, Writer, Professor
- Spouse: Vidyawati Khare
- Children: Amiya Ranjan Khare, Khanjan Sinha, Dr Malaya Ranjan Khare

Indra Bahadur Khare (16 December 1922 – 13 April 1953) was an Indian Hindi-language poet, a participant in Kavi-Sammelan, and a professor of 20th century Hindi literature.

== Personal life and education ==
Born in the City of Gadarwara, Narsinghpur district in Madhya Pradesh, Khare developed a taste for literature at a very young age. He received his primary school education at Sohagpur, Itarasi and from Katni in Madhya Pradesh. He received his middle school education at Mahoba Uttar Pradesh and his secondary school education at Kishori Raman Vidyalay Mathura, Uttar Pradesh. He then entered the University of Allahabad where he studied for a BA, living at the Shyam Sundar Hostel. Because of financial constraints, he was unable to complete his education at the time. After working odd jobs in Jabalpur he attended Hitkarini City College there and completed his BA. In 1949 he joined the college as a professor.

In 1946 he married Vidyawati Shrivastav, a school teacher who had an MA Degree in Sanskrit and M Ed. She was a teacher for more than thirty years and got blessed with three children namely Amiya Ranjan Khare, Khanjan Sinha, and Dr. Malaya Ranjan Khare.

Khare was admitted to Robertson College, Jabalpur, to study for an MA degree but was forced to withdraw because of his financial circumstances.

Among the notable individuals Khare taught during his career are: Acharya Shri Rajneesh Osho, Hari Krushna Tripathee, Professor Dr Uma Shankar Pathak, Prof Dr Jawahar Chourasiya Tarunh, and Gargee Sharan Mishra Maral, Prof Bharatdwaj.

An award, Aditya, was created in his honour at Maharashtra High School, for the student with the highest marks in Hindi studies.

== Career ==
For ten months in 1946 Khare taught at the Government Model High School in Jabalpur. While there he co-wrote Harinda with Harishankar Parsai who was a fellow teacher at the school. In 1947 he moved to Maharashtra High School. He received an MA degree from Nagpur University in 1948. He was then, along with well-known the writer Dr. Ramkumar Verma, associated with Prakash, a magazine produced by the Social Welfare Department of the Government of the Central Province of Nagpur in the Berar region. He also served as an approved Geetkar and Kahanikar at Akashvani in Nagpur from 1947 to 1952.

Since 2009, his book entitled Bhor ke Geet has been included as a part of the academic curriculum in the MA program at Pandit Ravishankar Shukla University, Raipur and, since 2013, at St Aloysius College Jabalpur for its BA programme in Hindi literature.

His works have also been included in the curricula of: Nagpur University, Indore, Gwalior, Agra, Ranchi, Bhopal, Jabalpur, Kolkata, Shantiniketan, Sagar, Rewa and Surguja.

== Research work on Khare ==
In the late 2000s, those interested in Hindi literature began to rediscover Khare's writings. They began to be regarded as a valuable contribution to the world of Hindi literature. Currently, there are students across the India doing research on the Khare's contributions to Hindi literature. (1) दिवंगत हिन्दी सेवी प्रो कवि इन्द्र बहादुर खरे ,लेखकआचार्य क्षेमचंद्र शुक्ल खंड 1, पृष्ठ 77, 1981. (2)जबलपुर की काव्यधारा लेखक पं.हरिकृष्ण त्रिपाठी, 1995 (3)"हिन्दी काव्यधारा को महाकोशल के कवियों का योगदान" पी एच डी, श्रीमती भावना शर्मा (शुक्ला),(10 पेज कवि इन्द्र बहादुर खरे)निदेशिका, प्रो सुषमा दुबे, रानी दुर्गावती वि वि जबलपुर, 1997 (4) प्रो डा विष्णु सरवदे के निर्देशन में छात्र राम प्रवेश यादव, "भोर के गीत" पुस्तक पर एम फिल 2015 मुंबई वि वि (5.) प्रो डा दिनेश चन्द्र चमोला जी के निर्देशन मे कु रेखा शर्मा (देहरादून), कवि चन्द्र कुअर वर्त्वाल एवं कवि इन्द्र बहादुर खरे, के काव्य का तुलनात्मक अध्ययन हरिव्दार संस्कृत वि वि,पी एच डी 2022 (6) प्रो चक्रधर त्रिपाठी जी के निर्देशन मे, कु ज्योति जायसवाल ने " इन्द्र बहादुर खरे की कहानियो में संवेदना एवं शिल्प" शान्ति निकेतन, पश्चिमी बंगाल ने लघु शोध 2022

== Collections ==
List of works (Kavita, Kahaani, Upanyaas and Music CDs)

Kavita

One of Khare's first books was Bhor ke geet(भोर के गीत) written between 1939-1942 at the age of 18. The book was later re-printed by Vani Prakashan Book Publishers in New Delhi in 2009. The book's publication was celebrated by parliamentarian Shri Balram Jakhar, former governor of Madhya-Pradesh, on 20 April 2009. The book is widely available for Hindi readers within India and is in libraries at MGI Mauritius and North Carolina State University, USA. In 2015 Bhor ke Geet Sameeksha pustak was released by Arunoday Prakashan, New Delhi.(ISBN 81-88473-24-3)

At the age of 20, 25 Jan 1943 he had written a poem ' Hemu Kalani' just after his hanging 21 Jan 1943, and it is published in 2017 after a span of 74 years. At the age of 23, Khare wrote another well known title, Vijan ke Phool(विजन के फूल), between 1944 and 1946. The book was originally published in 1955 by Jabalpur Sahitya Sangh. In 2011, this book, as well as Surbala, written between 1943–44, was re-published by Vani Prakashan Book Publishers. On 5 May 2011, the books were celebrated by Shri Rameshawar Thakur.

Rajani ke pal, another poetic collection, was written between 1941 and 1942. Vani Prakashan re-published the title in 2012.

Another of Khare's collections is Azaadee ke pahle Azaadee ke baad highlighting pre- and post-Independence India. It is a collection of more than 120 poems highlighting the struggle for Indian independence. Some 14,000+ school students in Bhilai, Chhattisgarh, and a few thousands nationwide sing the lines of Shri Khare song "Sir Par Shobhit Mukut Himalaya" during morning assembly and "Prabhat-Pheri" on 15 August and 26 January every year. Fifteen or more artists recite the same song in Mumbai on 9 August every year, at August Kranti Maidan in front of the Chief Minister of Maharashtra State and thousands of other patriots.

Kahaniya

Khare also wrote numerous stories during his lifetime covering many aspects of life, poverty, love, and romance some with a patriotic flavor. One of his story collections is Sapano ki Nagaree written between 1940 and 1943 which was re-published in 2012 by Vani Prakashan, New Delhi. The same publisher also reissued Dur Path ke Rahee, originally written in 1941, and plans to release the story collection Aaratee ke Deep.

Upanyaas

Khare also contributed several Upanyaas to the world of Hindi literature such as Kashmeer written in 1948. Others worthy of mention include: Jeevan path ke raahi, Mere Jeevan Prishth na padhe, and Lekh Holi, Nadi, Natak-Our Cinema and krasnavtar. Khare also wrote a famous essay on Shri Padumlal Punnalal Baxi in 1951 titled "padumlal Punna laal baxi meri drushti main" the same lekh was published in 1972 by Shri Narmada Prasad Khare."Sahitya Jagat Ke Biniva Padumlal Punnalal Baxi" in his name . This was brought to notice of knowledgeable Hindi experts.

== Music CDs ==
In early 1950s, Khare's work was used to compose songs sung by the artist, Smt. Santosh Jhanjhi. Nearly five decades after it was written, Khare's poems were the basis of songs on CDs such as: माँ! तुम हो भारत की माता, भोर के गीत and विजन के फूल. Lately, a few of his songs were also sung by Shri Shekhar Shrivastava from Dhanbad with Kumari Aashita Awasthy from Kanpur.

== Tributes and events ==
Each year thousands of Hindi readers, students, and Ph.D and MA candidates across India come together to acknowledge, and to spread the word about Khare's contributions to the world of Hindi literature. Below is the list of events and programs held in remembrance of some of his classic works.

S. No	Event	Venue	Date
1	Hindi-Divas	Shantiniketan	held every year on 14 September from 2009 onward
2	August Kranti Day (9th Aug 1942)	August Kranti Maidan, Mumbai	held yearly since from 9 Aug 2008
3	National Poems Exhibition	Bhopal Hindi Bhavan Bhopal Hindi Bhavan, Bhopal	13th Apr 2014
4	Poster exhibition of Khare's literature	All India students Hindi workshop, Mahakaushal MahaVidyalay Jabalpur} Example	6th Mar-8th Mar 2013
5	Poem recital on "Vasant"	Mahakaushal college, Jabalpur	15 Feb 2013
6	--	Patna University	27 Aug 2011
7	Khare par Saahitya-Charcha	Mauritius	16 March 2010
8	--	Vikram Shila Hindi Vidya Peeth Kanhayya sthaan Bhagalpur	2011
9	--	Ranchi University	2009
10	--	Jamshedpur Mahila Mahavidyalaya	2007
11	--	Bakhshee srujan Peeth, Bhilai, Raipur, Rajnandgaon, Bilaspur	
12	--	Bilaspur Central University	--
13	--	Durg Mahila MahaVidyalaya, Govt Science & Arts college	--
14	--	Osho Dham, Gondia	
15	--	Khandwa	
16	--	NathDwara Rajasthan	
17	--	Kolkata university	held yearly from 2007 to 2012
18	--	MahaSamund Degree College	2006
19	--	Chanchala Bai college Jabalpur	16 Dec 2007
