= Nirjhar Pratapgarhi =

Indian poet of Awadhi

Nirjhar Pratapgarhi is an Indian poet who wrote in Awadhi and Hindi. He is also an archaeologist from Pratapgarh, Uttar Pradesh, India. His real name is Rajesh Pandey.

He is the founder of India's first village museum, Ajgra Sangrahalay, in Raniganj tehsil, Pratapgarh district.

== See also ==
- List of archaeologists
- List of Awadhi-language poets
- List of Hindi poets
- List of Indian poets
- List of people from Uttar Pradesh
