= Choudhari Mulkiram =

Hindi poet

- Born: 11 April 1910; Bhatiyana, Hapur Tehsil, Meerut, United Provinces, British India (now Hapur district, Uttar Pradesh)
- Died: 21 August 1954 (aged 44); Hapur, Uttar Pradesh, India
- Education: B.A
- Alma mater: Meerut College
- Occupations: Writer, poet, social reformer
- Spouse: Nathodevi
- Writing career
- Language: Hindi
- Genres: Hindi literature, Dalit Literature
- Notable work: Hridayodgar

Choudhari Mulkiram or Mulkiram Choudhary (1910–1954) was a Hindi poet, philosopher and civil servant.

== Personal life ==
Choudhari Mulkiram was born into [KHATIK] caste to Choudhari Dansahay at Hapur, United Provinces, British India. He completed his graduation from the Meerut College (U.P.) and was appointed as the Superintendent in the Dept. of Rural Development.

== Career ==
In 1939 he was selected as PCS officer and was first posted as Deputy Collector of Hardoi and also been Director of Social Welfare Department in U.P govt.

He entered into Hindi literary movement and chosen poetry as a mean to social reform. He befriended Krishna Dutt Paliwal and started working for Dalit movement and annihilation of castes. He also got influenced from Arya Samaj and worked for welfare of people.

An anthology of his poems, 'Hridayodgar' was published posthumously by Dr.Tarachand Pal Bekal.
