= Vishnu Khare =

Indian poet, translator and critic

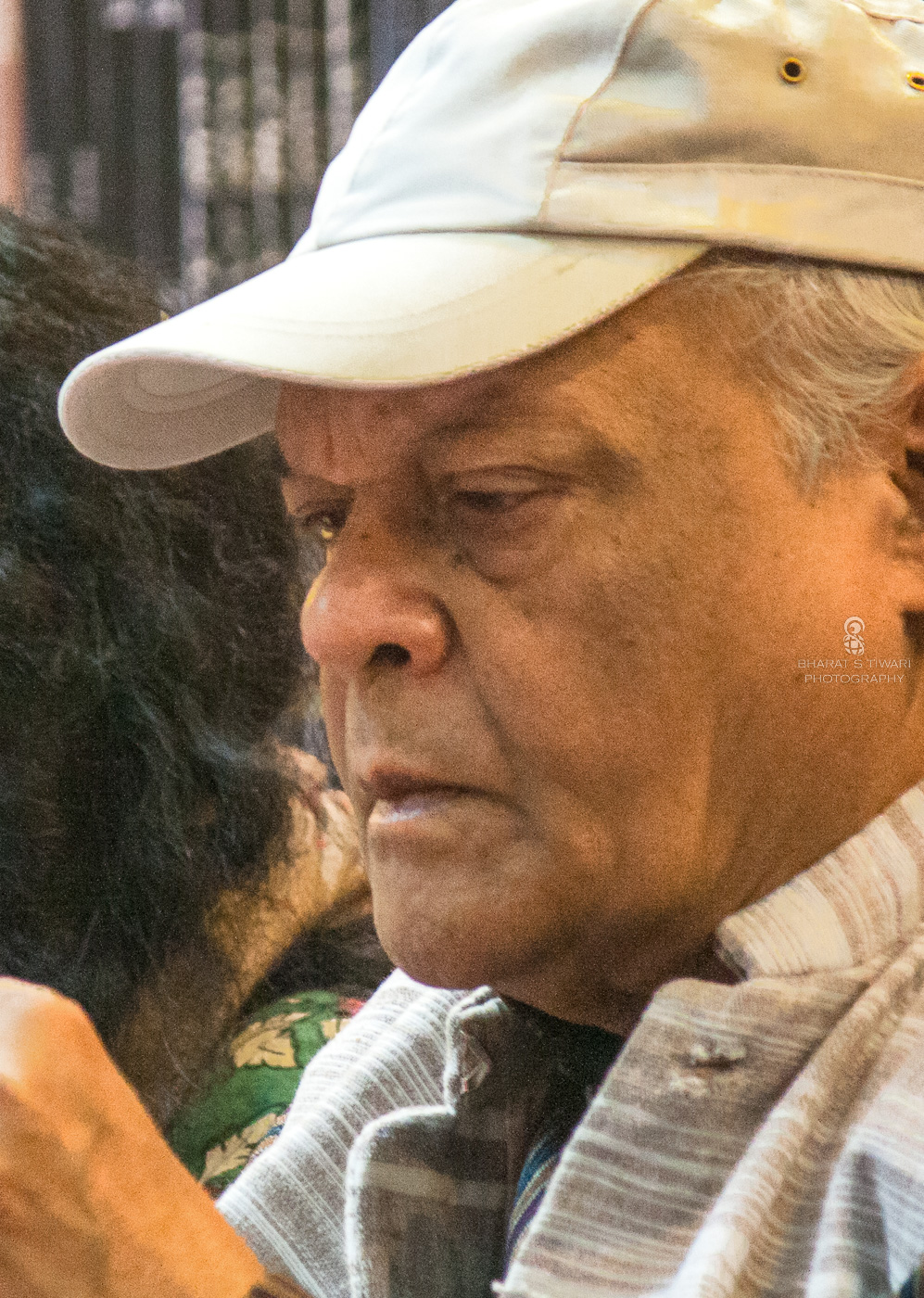
- Khare in 2016
- Born: February 9, 1940
- Died: September 19, 2018 (aged 78); New Delhi, India

Vishnu Khare (9 February 1940 – 19 September 2018) was an Indian Hindi poet, translator, literary and film critic, journalist and scriptwriter. He wrote both in Hindi and English. He taught English literature at university level, served as the Programme Secretary of Sahitya Akademi, the National Academy of Letters in India and was editor of the Hindi daily Navbharat Times" in Lucknow, Jaipur and New Delhi.

Vishnu Khare died on 19 September 2018 due to a brain haemorrhage in New Delhi.

== Works ==
Vishnu Khare published five collections of poetry, Pathantar (2008) being the latest, and a book of criticism Alochana kee Pahlee Kitaab. He was a prolific translator in Hindi, English, German and other European and Asian languages.

== Awards and honours ==
Khare was a recipient of many awards and honours, including an Order of the White Rose of Finland for his Hindi translation of the national epic of Finland, Kalevala. He was also awarded Order of the Cross of Terra Mariana, IV Class by Government of Estonia for his Hindi translation of the national epic of Estonia, Kalevipoeg. He received many prestigious Hindi literary awards like the Rahguveer Sahay Samman, Maithilisharan Gupt Samman as well as the Shikhar Samman.
