= Hindi Academy =

- Formation: 1981; 45 years ago
- Type: NGO
- Headquarters: New Delhi
- Location: New Delhi
- Official language: Hindi
- Key people: Manish Sisodia (President); Surendra Sharma (Vice-President)
- Affiliations: Art, Culture and Language Department of the Government of Delhi
- Website: Official Website

Hindi Academy (Hindi: हिन्दी अकादमी) is an autonomous organisation in Delhi, India, set up by the Government of Delhi in 1981. The organisation was founded to promote Hindi language, literature and culture. The deputy CM of Delhi, Manish Sisodia, is the president of the academy, and poet Surendra Sharma is serving as the vice-president. The organisation works under the direction of the Delhi government's Art, Culture and Language Department.

The Hindi Academy honors litterateurs, journalists, writers and poets for their contributions to Hindi literature. After the death of Aam Aadmi Party leader Santosh Koli in 2013, the Hindi Academy announced another award of ₹200,000 titled Hindi Akademi Shikhar Samman.

== See also ==
- Central Institute of Hindi
- Sahitya Akademi
- Urdu Academy, New Delhi
- World Hindi Secretariat
