= Kaka Hathrasi =

Indian satirist and poet (1906–1995)

- Born: Prabhu Lal Garg; 18 September 1906; Hathras (Uttar Pradesh), United Provinces of Agra and Oudh, British India
- Died: September 18, 1995 (aged 89)
- Occupations: satirist, humorist poet-writer

Kaka Hathrasi (18 September 1906 – 18 September 1995) was a Braj and Hindi satirist and humorist poet from India.

== Life and career ==
Hathrasi was born as Prabhu Lal Garg. He wrote under the pen name Kaka Hathrasi. He chose "Kaka", as he played the character in a play which made him popular, and "Hathrasi" after the name of his hometown Hathras. He has 42 works to his credit, comprising a collection of humorous and satirical poems, prose and plays published by various publishers. He also wrote three books on Indian classical music under the pen name "Vasant". In 1932, he established Sangeet Karyalaya (initially Garg and Co.), a publishing house for the books on Indian classical music and dance and started publishing a monthly magazine Sangeet in 1935. Sangeet is the only periodical on Indian classical music and dance that has been continuously published for over 78 years.

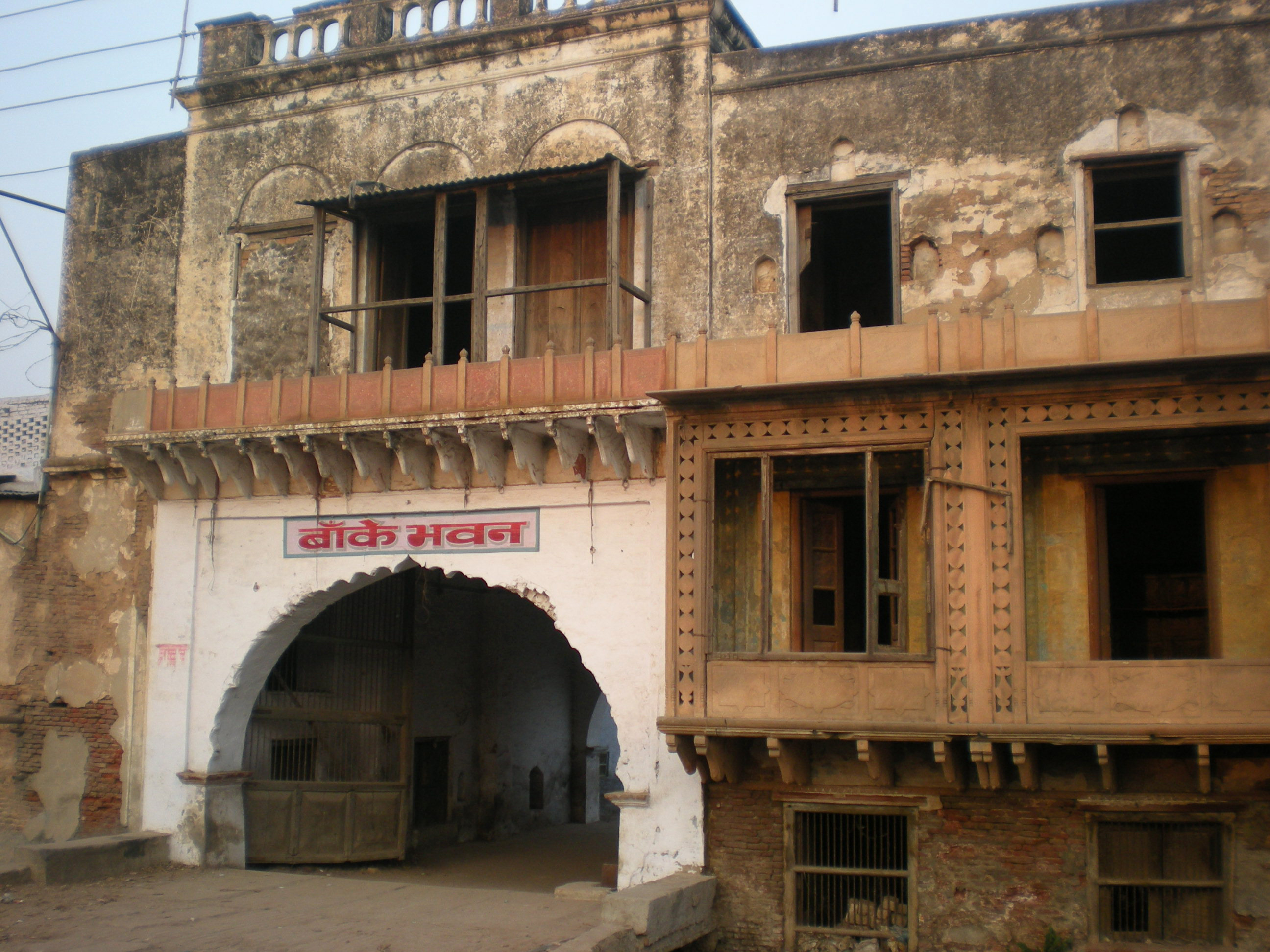
Banke Bhawan Residence of Kaka Hathrasi at Hathras

He was awarded Padma Shri by the government of India in 1985. Every year, the Delhi-based "Hindi Academy" awards the annual Kaka Hathrasi Award for outstanding contribution in the literary field.

== Works ==
=== Humorous poetry ===
- Kaka Tarang. Diamond Pocket Books (P) Ltd., 2005. ISBN 81-7182-513-3.
- Kaka Ki Chaupal. Diamond Pocket Books (P) Ltd., 2006, ISBN 81-7182-754-3.
- Jai Bolo Baiman Ki, Diamond Pocket Books (P) Ltd., 2006. ISBN 81-288-0693-9.
- Mera Jeevan : A-One (Autobiography), Diamond Pocket Books (P) Ltd., 1993. ISBN 81-288-1015-4.

== Film production ==
Kaka Hathrasi and his son Dr. Laxmi Narayan Garg made a Brij Bhasha-language feature film "Jamuna Kinare" (1983) which based on Braj culture. The film is made under the banner of "Kaka Hathrasi Films Production", produced, directed and music composed by Dr. Laxmi Narayan Garg and story was written by Ashok Chakradhar (Kaka Hathrasi 's son-in-law, husband of Kaka's niece, Ms Bageshri)
