= Sarvesh Asthana =

Indian poet (born 1965)

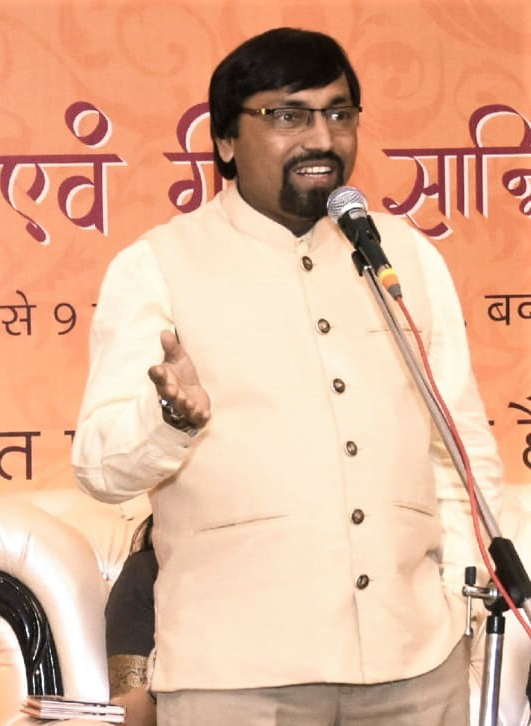
- Born: 10 September 1965 (age 60); Hardoi, Uttar Pradesh, India
- Other name: Smile Man
- Occupations: Poet, Writer, Activist
- Organization(s): Khilona Bank, Search Foundation, Lantrani, Bal Utsav, Youth Festival (Lucknow Mahotsav), Sahityagandha Magazine
- Awards: Yash Bharti by Government of Uttar Pradesh (2016); Sohan Lal Dwivedi Award by Uttar Pradesh Hindi Sansthan
- Writing career
- Language: Hindi
- Genres: Poetry, Satire, Ghazal, Children's poetry
- Website: Official website

Sarvesh Asthana (born 10 September 1965) is an Indian poet, writer and satirist, who writes and performs in the Hindi language. He has authored around 12 books. Asthana has contributed to various genres of Hindi literature, including Hasya Kavita (humorous comic poetry), Vyangya (satire) and Bal kavita (children's rhymes). He was honored with the Yash Bharati, the highest civilian award of the Government of Uttar Pradesh for his contribution in the field of literature in 2016. He is also the recipient of the Sohan Lal Dwivedi Award by the Uttar Pradesh Hindi Sansthan, Government of Uttar Pradesh. Asthana was appointed the advisor to the Indian Council for Cultural Relations (ICCR) in 2019.

== Early life ==
Sarvesh Asthana was born on 10 September 1965, in Hardoi, India. He is the son of Awadhi language poet and freedom fighter Banke Lal Asthana. He is a law graduate and journalist by profession.

== Career ==
Some of his published notable books include Vo Balcony Wale (memoir collection), Bhor Vibhor (poetry collection), Inko Jaano Inhe Manaao (children's poetry collection), Khaulta Makarand (song collection), Tanhaaiya Aabad Hain (Ghazal collection), Wazir Baadshah (prose satire poetry), Shamshan Ghat (satire) and Isko Sheesh Nawao (children's poetry collection).

Sarvesh Asthana is active in the Hindi poetry circuit and Kavi Sammelan for more than 35 years. He has written thousands of prose satire besides the poetry, Ghazal and children's literature. He is the founder and principal editor of the literary magazine, 'Sahityagandha'. He has performed poetry across India and overseas countries like the UK, the USA, Thailand, Dubai, Indonesia and Oman. He is a regular on the radio and in two TV comedy serials, Hero Koun (Who's the Hero?) and Miss Ramkalie, aired on Doordarshan.

In his personal life, he is working for destitute and needy children for the last twenty years, as reported in September 2018 by Dainik Jagran. Asthana has also founded the ' Khilona Bank' (toy bank), which organizes the annual 'Bal Utsav', a ten-day children's festival since 2001. He is also a member of the Juvenile Justice Selection Committee.

He is the founder of Search Foundation, an organization to help needy children. He also organizes Lantrani, an annual Humorous programme on April Fool's Day since 2016 and Youth Festival, a part from Lucknow Mohotsav, which was co-founded by Asthana and Mukul Mohan in 1995. In March 2019, Sarvesh Asthana was named the advisor to the Indian Council for Cultural Relations (ICCR).

== Books ==
- Vo Balcony Wale (memoir collection)
- Bhor Vibhor (poetry collection)
- Inko Jaano Inhe Manaao (children's poetry collection)
- Khaulta Makarand (song collection)
- Tanhaaiya Aabad Hain (Ghazal collection)
- Wazir Baadshah (prose satire poetry)
- Shamshan Ghat (satire collection)
- Inko Shish Nawaz (children's poetry collection)
- Inhe Dekh Kar Khush ho Jao (children's book)
- Inko khao Swasthya Banao (children's book)
- Ao Paryawaran Bachayen (children's book)
- Internet Ka Nasha Aur Apke Bachche (children's book)

== Awards and recognition ==
- In 2016, Sarvesh Asthana was facilitated with Yash Bharati, the highest civilian award of the Government of Uttar Pradesh.
- He was awarded the Awadh Jyoti Samman by Awadh Bharati Sansthan in 2020.
- He was honored with Sohan Lal Dwivedi Award by the Uttar Pradesh Hindi Sansthan, Government of Uttar Pradesh.
- In 2014, Asthana received the Kaka Hathrasi Award by Kaka Hathrasi Puraskar Trust.
- In 2017, he received the Hindi Sahitya Seva Samman by the Hindi Vikas Parishad.
- Asthana awarded the Antarrashtriya Vyangya Samman (International Satire Award) by the International Hindi Association in 2014.
- He was honored with Kaka Devesh Vyangya Shiromani Award in September 2019 and the award was bestowed by Jagadguru Rambhadracharya of Pushkar Dham.
