= Yash Bharati =

Civilian award of Uttar Pradesh

Yash Bharati Award
- Type: Highest State Civilian honour
- Awarded for: Services of personalities in various fields
- Sponsored by: Government of Uttar Pradesh
- Location: Uttar Pradesh
- Reward: ₹11,00000
- First award: 1994

Precedence
- Equivalent: UP Gaurav Samman

Yash Bharati Award is the highest civilian award of the Government of Uttar Pradesh. Instituted in 1994, it is awarded to those personalities whose contribution is remarkable in the field of literature, social work, medicine, film, science, journalism, handicrafts, culture, education, music, drama, sports, industry and astrology.

These awards were first given in 1994. The winners were given a commendation letter, a shawl and ₹1 lakh. In 2005–06, the U.P. Government increased the cash award amount to ₹5 lakh. The awards were stopped between 1995 and 2003 and again from 2007 to 2012. Since 2012, the recipient is awarded a commendation letter, a shawl and ₹11 lakh, along with a pension of ₹50,000 per month, on demand. Many eminent persons in the field of Literature, Social work, Handicrafts, Culture, Music, Drama, Sports, Industry, Cinema, etc. have been awarded with Yash Bharti Samman, however, it has also drawn some flak from media and the public for arbitrary distribution and wastage of tax payers money.

== The list of awardees ==
=== 1994 ===
1. Pradip Mehta: literature
2. Amitabh Bachchan: acting
3. Jaya Bachchan: acting
4. Baleshwar Yadav:

=== 2006 ===
1. Abhishek Bachchan: acting
2. Viveki Rai: writing
3. Vijay Kumar: journalism

=== 2007 ===
- Urmilesh Shankhdhar: literature

=== 2013 ===
- Rajendra Yadav: literature

=== 2015 ===
1. Lodi Mohammad Safi Khan alias 'Bekal Utsahi': literature
2. Devi Prasad Pandey "Adig": literature
3. Khushbir Singh Shaad: literature
4. DR.Gyan Chaturvedi: literature
5. DR. Vishnu Saxena: literature
6. Hamid Ullah 'Hamid hadee': literature
7. Pandit Rajan and Sajan Mishra: classical vocal
8. Anup Jalota: choral singing
9. Shubha Mudgal: classical vocal
10. Ravindra Jain: music
11. Pandit Vikash Maharaj: sarod
12. Rekha Bhardwaj: light music
13. Pro. Rita Gaguli: singing Upshastriy
14. Kailash Kher: singing
15. Rahat Ali Khan Sabri: Ghazals, Sufi songs and singing
16. Hira Lal Yadav: Lokgayn
17. Bansh Gopal Yadav: singing Alhaa
18. Vishnu Yadav: singing Birha
19. Pro. Jaikrishna Agarwal: painting
20. Raj Kumar Varma: painting, Micro-painting
21. Krishn Kanhai & Govind Kanhai: gold-painting
22. Iftakhar Nadime Khan: wood art
23. DR. Jagdish Gandhi: education
24. Pro. Bhagirath Prasad Tripathi 'Wagish Shastri': education
25. DR. Kumkum Dhar: Kathak
26. Geetanjali Sharma: Kathak and Braj Folk Dance
27. Sheetala Pandey 'Samir': film lyricist
28. Yogesh Gaur: songwriting
29. DR. Urmil Kumar Thapliyal: public theatre
30. Ashok Kumar Singh: hockey
31. Bachan Lal Yadav: wrestling
32. Munawar Anjar: judo
33. DR. RP Singh: hockey
34. Dharmendra Yadav: boxing
35. Bhagat Singh: wrestling
36. Vijay Pal Yadav: wrestling
37. Rajesh Kumar Yadav: sailing
38. Shweta Priyadarshini: chess
39. Avinash Yadav: sports
40. Alka Tomar: female wrestling
41. Punam Yadav: weightlifting
42. Raj Kumar: wrestling
43. Hakim Syed Zillur Rahman: Greek medicine (Yunani medicine)
44. Buddhi Prakash: yoga and naturopathy
45. DR. CS Yadav: medicine
46. Dr. Rakesh Yadav: medicine
47. TP Trivedi: astrology
48. Vinod Mehta: journalism
49. Jasjit Singh Gill alias Jimmy Shergill: film acting
50. Nawazuddin Siddiqui: film acting
51. Girdhar Lal Mishra Ramanandacharya Jagadguru Swami Bhadracharya: philanthropy
52. Darshan Singh Yadav: philanthropy
53. Ramesh Bhaiya: philanthropy
54. Captain Yogendra Singh Yadav: military service

=== 2016 ===
(Given in March 2016)

1. Irfan Habib: education
2. Dr.Naresh Trehan: medicine
3. Prof. (Dr.) Ravi Kant: medicine
4. Ustaad Ghulam Mustafa Khan: vocal music
5. Ustaad Gulshan Bharti: vocal music
6. Surabhi Ranjan: vocal music
7. Sudhir Mishra: film direction
8. Vishal Bhardwaj: film direction
9. Anurag Kashyap: film direction
10. Ashok Chakradhar: literature
11. Arunima Sinha: mountaineering
12. Aparna Kumar: mountaineering
13. Dr. (Brig.) T. Prabhakar: medicine
14. Sthavi Asthana: horse riding
15. Raju Srivastava: comedy
16. Hemant Sharma: journalism
17. R. P. Singh: cricket
18. Anwar Jalalpuri: literature
19. Nahid Abidi: literature
20. Seema Punia: athletics
21. Jagbir Singh: hockey
22. Major AK Singh: rowing
23. Kamla Srivastava: folk music
24. Abhin Shyam Gupta: badminton
25. Sunil Jogi: literature
26. Gopal Chaturvedi: literature
27. Girja Shankar: literature
28. Sunil Kumar Rana: sports
29. Vijay Singh Chauhan: athletics
30. Anuj Chowdhary: sports
31. Nawaz Deobandi: education
32. Wazir Ahmad Khan: chess
33. Chakesh Kumar Jain: art
34. Narendra Singh Rana: powerlifting
35. Iqbal Ahmad Siddiqui: ghazal
36. Kum Kum Adarsh: Kathak
37. Lalji Yadav: wrestling
38. Imran Khan: poetry
39. Ankit Tiwari: singing
40. Madhukar Trivedi: journalism
41. Sudha Singh: athletics
42. Dinesh Lal Yadav "Nirahua": acting
43. Manu Kumari Pal: athletics
44. Alim Ullah siddiqui: painting
45. Servesh Yadav: shooting
46. Subhash Gupta: medicine

=== 2016-17 ===
(Given in October 2016)

1. Rahul Kumar: Cricket
2. Jeetu sharma: Cricket
3. Umakant Tomar: Literature
4. Deepak Oli : Cricket
5. Mohammad Imran Pratapgarhi: Urdu Poetry
6. Amir Shabbir: editing
7. Ustaad gulfam: classical music
8. Sony Chaurasia: Kathak
9. Kashinath Yadav Birha:
10. Aftab Sabri, Hashim Sabri: Qawwali
11. Mo. Aslam Warsi: Sufi singing
12. Gyanendra Pandey: cricket
13. Bhuvneshwar Kumar: cricket
14. Praveen Kumar: cricket
15. Chawla: cricket
16. Santosh Anand: songwriting
17. Naseeruddin Shah: acting
18. Saurabh Shukla: directing
19. Anubhav Sinha: directing
20. Sumona Chakravarti: acting
21. Swaroop Kumar Kumar Bakshi: literature
22. Anil Rastogi: theatre work
23. Nawab Jafar Mir Abdullah: sports and arts
24. Suman Yadav: game
25. Mo. Bashir Badar: literature
26. Venkat Changavli: philanthropy
27. Farooq Ahmed: philanthropy
28. Dr Sabiha Anwar: education
29. Dr. Rakesh Kapoor: medicine
30. Syed Mohd. Hssna: Greek medicine
31. Yogesh Mishra: journalism
32. Kamar Rahman: education & science
33. Manoj Muntashir: lyricist
34. Begum Habibullah: social service
35. Pandit Vishwanath: classical music
36. DR. Ratish Agarwal: medicine
37. Raj Krishna Mishra: literature
38. Rajendra Singh: water harvesting
39. Manendra Kumar Mishra: writing
40. Gen Anil Chait: military service
41. Maheshwar Tiwari: literature
42. Sarvesh Asthana: literature
43. Oma The Akk: literature
44. Deepraj Rana: film direction
45. Ravi Kapoor: photography
46. Dr. Deepak Agrawal: medicine
47. DR. Ramratan Raina: medicine
48. DR. Shivani Matnhelia: classical music
49. Ashok Nigam: journalism
50. Arjun Bajpai: hiking
51. Vijay Shekhar Sharma: mobile banking
52. Gargi Yadav: wrestling
53. Ram Milan Yadav: wrestling
54. Ramakant Yadav: medicine
55. Atam Prakash Mishra: television
56. Gaur Das Chowdhury: medicine
57. Dr Ram Singh Yadav : Literature
58. Dhananjay Rai: sports
59. Noor Alassaba: artist & portraitist
60. Chakresh Kumar Jain: handicraft
61. Archana Satish: anchor
62. Shikha Dwivedi: anchor
63. Varun Kumar: paralympics
