= Sonroopa Vishal =

Indian writer (born 1977)

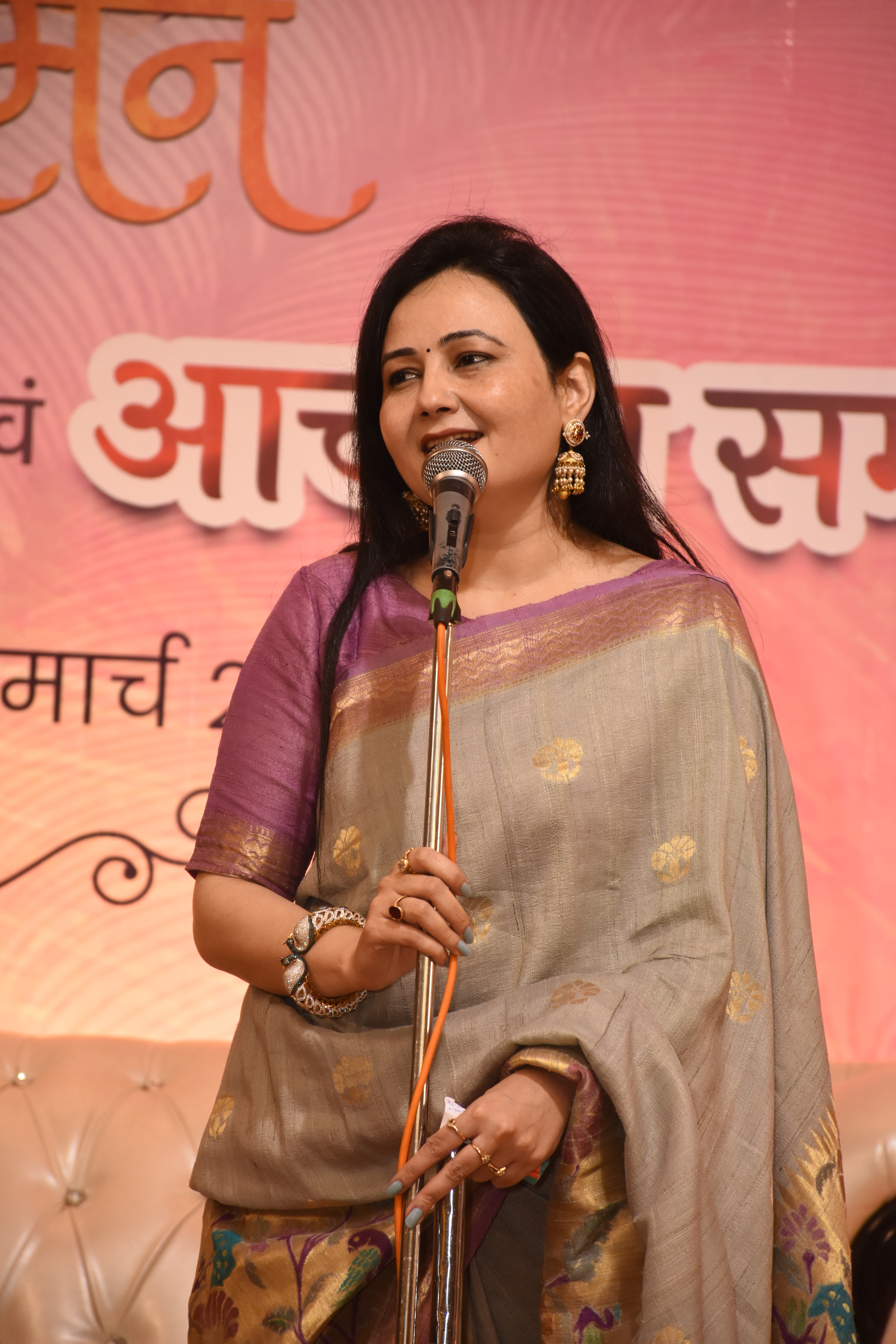
- Sonroopa Vishal in Aagman 2021
- Born: 30 October 1977 (age 48); Budaun, Uttar Pradesh, India
- Education: M.A. (Hindi), PhD
- Alma mater: Dayalbagh Educational Institute; Prayag Sangeet Samiti; Mahatma Jyotiba Phule Rohilkhand University
- Occupations: Poet, Writer
- Writing career
- Language: Hindi
- Genres: Poetry, Ghazal
- Notable works: Likhna Zaruri Hai (2014); America Aur 45 Din (2018); Pichle Baras Ka Gulmohur (2019)
- Notable awards: Harivansh Rai Bachchan Navodit Geetkaar Award (2014) & Jagadish Gupta Sarjana Award (2019) by Uttar Pradesh Hindi Sansthan, Government of Uttar Pradesh
- Website: Official website

Sonroopa Vishal (born 30 October 1977) is an Indian writer, poet and author, who writes in the Hindi language. The State Government of Uttar Pradesh awarded her with the Harivansh Rai Bachchan Navodit Geetkaar Award in 2015 and Jagadish Gupta Sarjana Award in 2019. Sonroopa Vishal has published three books, including Likhna Zaruri Hai (2014) and America Aur 45 Din (2018), and co-authored several books.

== Early life and education ==
She has done an MA in Hindi from Mahatma Jyotiba Phule Rohilkhand University. She has also studied Music from Dayalbagh Educational Institute and holds a Sangeet Prabhakar (bachelor of music degree) from Prayag Sangeet Samiti, Allahabad. She has done a PhD from Rohilkhand University. She is the daughter of famous Hindi poet Dr. Urmilesh Shankhdhar.

== Career ==
Sonroopa published her first poetry collection in 2014 titled, Likhna Zaroori Hai. The book was well received and won the Harivansh Rai Bachchan Navodit Geetkaar Samman by the State Government of Uttar Pradesh in 2015.

Her second book, America Aur 45 Din was published in 2018 by Hindi Yugm. She wrote this travelogue during her stay in the US when she visited a series of poets' conferences organized in 25 cities of the US by the International Hindi Committee. In January 2019, it was launched by Ashok Chakradhar at New Delhi World Book Fair. During the launch, Chakradhar said, that the way Sonroopa has seen America in her journey from this point of view is amazing. She is seen very beautifully threading the emotions and feelings of the mind. In September 2019, she was honoured with the Jagadish Gupta Award for her book America Aur 45 Din by the Uttar Pradesh Hindi Sansthan.

Her third book is Pichle Baras Ka Gulmohur, a poetry collection which was published in 2019. She is the editor of Dr. Urmilesh special issue of Saraswati Suman magazine. Her fourth book, Hindi Ghazal Aur Dr. Urmilesh was published in 2021.

Sonroopa Vishal has also co-authored several books and anthologies, including Stri Hokar Saval Karti Hai, Samkaleen Mahila Ghazalkar, Kavita Anvarat and Srajan Ke Sitare. She has recited and performed her poetry during Kavi sammelan at Red Fort, Sahitya Academy, IIT Kharagpur, to various TV channels. Vishal is also an Indian Council for Cultural Relations, Government of India approved vocalist and Ghazal singer.

== Published works ==
=== Books ===
- Likhna Zaruri Hai, 2014, Hind Yugm, ISBN 9789381394793
- America Aur 45 Din, 2018, Hindi Yugm, ISBN 978-9387464476
- Pichle Baras Ka Gulmohur, 2019, Anybook, ISBN 978-9386619358
- Hindi Ghazal Aur Dr. Urmilesh, 2021, Anybook, ISBN 978-8195286874

=== Anthologies ===
- Stree Hokar Sawaal Karti Hai, 2012, Bodhi Prakashan, ISBN 978-9381596395
- Nari Vimarsh Ke Arth, 2013, Hindi Yugm, ISBN 978-9381394410
- Kavita Anvarat

=== CDs ===
- Aapka Saath

== Award and recognition ==
- She won the 'Harivansh Rai Bachchan Debutant Lyricist Award' for the year 2015 by Uttar Pradesh Hindi Sansthan, Government of Uttar Pradesh for her first Ghazal collection Likhna Zaruri Hai.
- In 2019, Sonroopa Vishal was awarded Jagadish Gupta Sarjana Award for her travelogue book, America Aur 45 Din by the Uttar Pradesh Hindi Sansthan, Government of Uttar Pradesh.
- In 2018, she was honoured with the Geet-Ghazal Shiromani Award by the Consulate-General of India in Washington.
- Vishal was awarded the Yuva Ratna Shikhar Samman at the 24th National Youth Festival under the banner of the Institute of Professional Studies in November 2018.
- In November 2012, Sonroopa Vishal was awarded the 'Kala Shree Samman' at the International Hindi Conference organized by the Adharshila Sansthan in Mauritius.
- In March 2018, she was given Sahitya Gaurav Samman by Rajya Karmachari Sahitya Sansthan, UP, and the award was bestowed by Ram Naik, the Governor of Uttar Pradesh.
- She received the 'Kavita Ke Chhupe Rustam' Award in SAB TV's comic poetry series, Wah Wah Kya Baat Hai in 2012.
- She was awarded the 'Budaun Gaurav Samman' by the then Chief Minister of Uttar Pradesh, Mulayam Singh Yadav.

== See also ==
- List of Hindi-language authors
- List of Hindi-language poets
