= Shivmangal Singh Suman =

Indian poet and academician

- Born: 5 August 1915; Unnao, United Provinces of Agra and Oudh, British India
- Died: 27 November 2002 (aged 87); Ujjain, Madhya Pradesh, India
- Occupations: Poet, academician
- Writing career
- Notable works: Mitti Ki Baarat, Hillol, Jeevan Ke Gaan
- Notable awards: 1974: Sahitya Akademi Award; 1999: Padma Bhushan; 1974: Padma Shri

Shivmangal Singh "Suman" (5 August 1915 – 27 November 2002) was an Indian poet and academician who wrote in Hindi.

== Biography ==
Shivmangal Singh 'Suman' was born on 5 August 1915 at Jhagarpur, Unnao district in the United Provinces of Agra and Oudh of British India. He belonged to a Pratihar Rajput family. He was a leading Hindi writer and poet. He earned a M.A. and Ph.D. in Hindi from Benaras Hindu University. The university also honoured him with a D.Litt. in 1950.

== Career ==
Suman worked as the Vice Chancellor of Vikram University (Ujjain) during 1968–78; the Vice-President of Uttar Pradesh Hindi Sansthan, Lucknow; Press & Cultural Attache, Indian Embassy, Kathmandu (Nepal) during 1956–61; and the President, Association of Indian Universities (New Delhi) during 1977–78.

He was the Executive President, Kalidas Academy, Ujjain, until his death due to a heart attack on 27 November 2002.

Upon his death, the then Prime Minister of India, Atal Bihari Vajpayee said that, "Dr. Shivmangal Singh ‘Suman’ was not only a powerful signature in the field of Hindi poetry, but he was also the custodian of the collective consciousness of his time. His creations not only expressed the pain of his own feelings, but were also fearless constructive commentary on the issues of the era."

== Works ==
=== Poetry collections ===
- Hillol (1939)
- Jeevan Ke Gaan (1942)
- Yug Ka Mol (1945)
- Pralay Srijan (1950)
- Vishvas Badhta Hi Gaya (1948)
- Vindhya Himalaya (1960)
- Mitti Ki Baarat (1972)
- Vani Ki Vyatha (1980)
- Kate Anguthon Ki Bandanavaren (1991)
- Fagun Me Savan
- Toffan Ki Our
- Hum Panchi Unmukt Gagan ke
- Chalana hamara kam he
- Vardan Mangunga Nahi

=== Essays ===
- Mahadevi Ki Kavya Sadhana

=== Plays ===
- Prakriti Purusha Kalidasa

== Awards and honours ==
- Padma Shri - 1974
- Padma Bhushan - 1999
- Deva Puraskar - 1958
- Soviet Land Nehru Award - 1974
- Sahitya Akademi Award - 1974 for Mitti Ki Barat
- Shikhar Samman - 1993 from the Government of Madhya Pradesh
- Bharat Bharti Award - 1993
- D.Litt. By Bhagalpur University - 1973
- D.Litt. By Jabalpur University - 1983
