= Suryakumar Pandey =

Indian poet, humorist, and writer (born 1954)

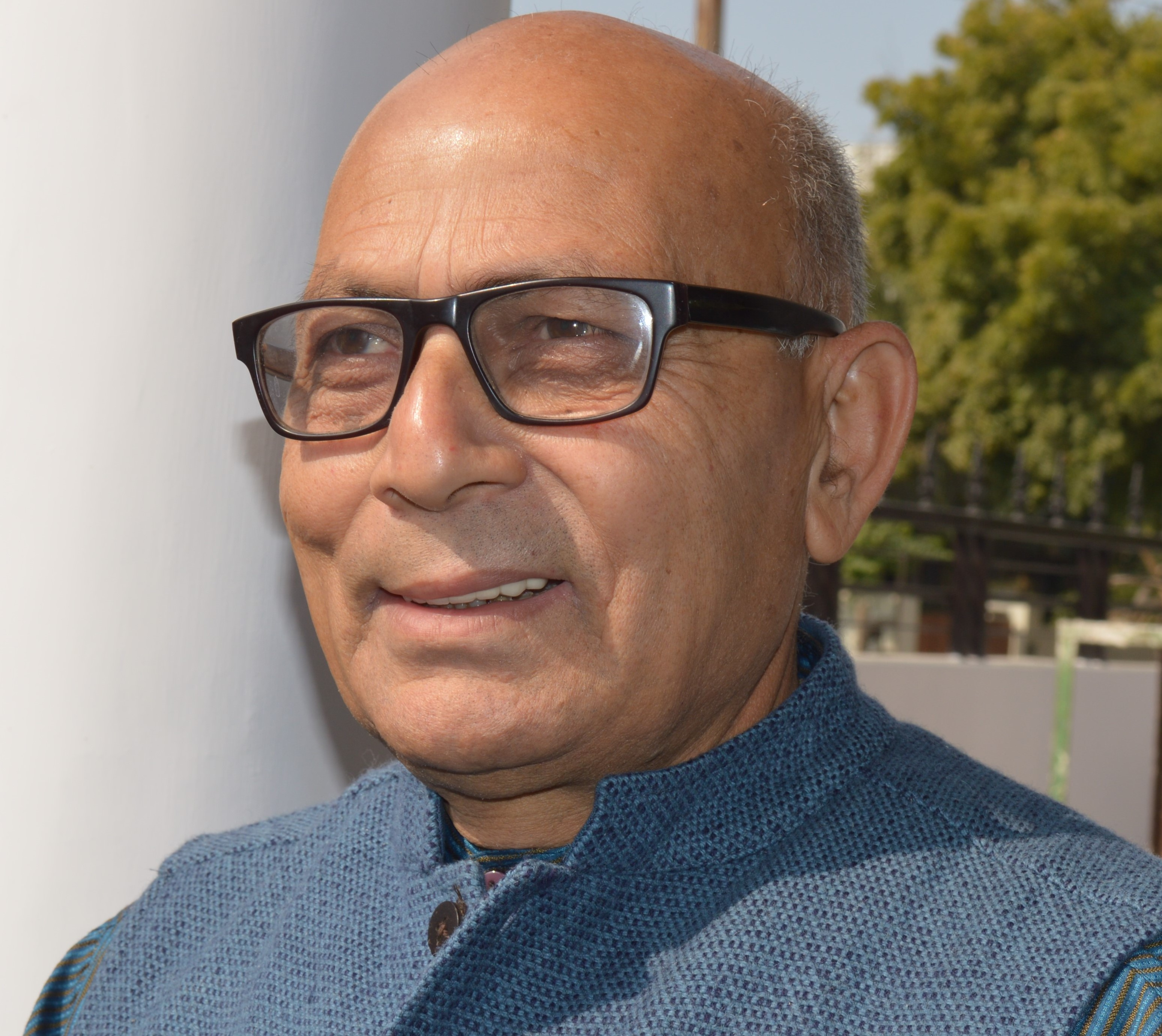
- Suryakumar Pandey in 2016
- Born: 10 October 1954 (age 71); Ballia, Uttar Pradesh, India
- Occupations: Poet, Writer

Suryakumar Pandey (born 10 October 1954) is an Indian humorist, poet, writer, and satirist. He has contributed to multiple Hindi literature genres, including Vyangya (satire) and Bal Kavita (children's poetry).

Pandey is recognized as a Hasya Kavi for his distinct language and writing style. He is known for his Hasya Kavita recitations at Hindi Kavi sammelans, both in India and internationally.

== Early life ==
Suryakumar Pandey was born on 10 October 1954 in Ballia, Uttar Pradesh. He went to primary school in Ballia before moving to Lucknow in 1967. After obtaining his master's degree in Mathematical Statistics from the University of Lucknow, he held several key posts in the Health Department of the Uttar Pradesh Government. In December of 2015, he retired from his government duties.

== Literary Career ==
From a young age, Pandey has been an active Hindi poet and writer. His work has featured in literary magazines and textbooks, such as Sahitya Akademi, Hindi Sahitya, and Dainik Sahitya. He has contributed to several genres of Hindi literature, such as Hasya Kavita (humorous comedic poetry), Vyangya (satirical articles), Geet (songs), and Bal Kavita (children's rhymes).

Pandey is a Hindi Hasya Kavi (comedic poet). He is known for his distinctive style of writing. Pandey has performed in over 4,000 shows and Kavi Sammelans across four decades. In 2016, Pandey toured over 20 cities in the United States and Canada for Hindi Kavi Sammelans. He also attended conferences organized by the International Hindi Association to promote Hindi literature in the United States.

Pandey worked as a poet for Doordarshan and Akashvani All India Radio, writing scripts, songs, reciting poetry, and participating in Kavi Sammelans. He has recited his poetry for several national television channels, including DD Bharti, ABP News, Aaj Tak, News Nation, ETV Network, SAB TV, Sony Pal, Zee News, Sahara Samay, and APN News. In recent years, he has made multiple appearances on SAB TV's Wah! Wah! Kya Baat Hai!. He writes regularly for several national Hindi newspapers.

Suryakumar Pandey has written over 25 books across genres of Hindi literature. His books include:

- Chikne Ghade
- Waah Waah
- Rukawat Ke Liye Khed Hai
- Pandeyji ke Pathakhe
- Pet Mein Dadhiyan Hain
- Waah Ji Pandey Ji Waah Waah
- Apne Yahan Sab Chalta Hai
- Hasya Vyangya Sartaj Suryakumar Pandey
- Geet Manjari
- Mera Harapan Shesh Hai (101 Geet)
- Laat Sahab ke Thath
- Khari Maskhari
- Aadha Phagun Aadha June.
- Chauri-Chaura: Jankranti ka Naya Saver.a
- Meri Priy Bal Kavitayein.

== Awards ==
In recognition of his contribution to Hindi literature, Suryakumar Pandey has received many awards, including:

- International Vyangya Shiromani Samman by International Hindi Association, Washington, D.C. (2016)
- Kaka Hathrasi Puraskar
- Pt. Shrinarayan Chaturvedi Vyangya Puruskar by Uttar Pradesh Hindi Sansthan
- Soor Puraskar by Uttar Pradesh Hindi Sansthan
- Sohanlal Dwivedi Samman by Uttar Pradesh Hindi Sansthan
- Attahhas Samman by Madhyam Sahityik Sansthan
- Saraswati Sahitya Samman (1998)
- Bhartendu Harishchandra Award, by the Ministry of Information and Broadcasting, Government of India (2004)<refname="pib"/>
- Vyangyashri Samman by Madhuban, Rajasthan
- K.P. Saxena Varishth Vyangyakar Samman (2017)
- Sahityashri Samman by Hindi-Urdu Sahitya Award Committee
- Amritlal Nagar Samman by Fankaar Society
- Awadh ki Shaan Alankaran by Ramanik Society (2018)
- Bal Sahitya Bharti Samman by Uttar Pradesh Hindi Sansthan (2018)
- Bhushundi Saraswat Samman (2021)
- First International Premchand Samman, Norway by Indo-Norwegian Information and Cultural Forum, Norway (2021)
- First Shambhu Prasad Srivastava Sahitya Srijan Samman by Sankalp Shrishti (2021)
- Gyanada Gaurav Yugpurush Samman by Guide Social Welfare Organisation (2021)
