= Vanshidhar Shukla =

Indian freedom fighter, politician (1904–1980)

Member of the Legislative Assembly
- In office 1957–1962
- Succeeded by: Banshidhar Misra
- Constituency: Sri Nagar

Personal details
- Born: 23 January 1904 Manyora village, Lakhimpur district, Uttar Pradesh, India
- Died: 26 April 1980 (aged 76)
- Party: Indian National Congress; Praja Socialist Party
- Parent: Chhedilal Shukla (father)
- Occupation: Freedom fighter, Politician, Poet, Writer
- Known for: Writing the patriotic song Qadam Qadam Badhaye Ja

Pandit Vanshidhar Shukla (23 January 1904 – 26 April 1980) was an Indian freedom fighter, politician, and poet of Hindi and Awadhi language. He is best for writing the patriotic song Qadam Qadam Badhaye Ja, which became the regimental quick march of the Indian National Army, banned by the British in India post-World War II but later became a patriotic anthem of India after India's independence.

He served as a Member of the Legislative Assembly from Sri Nagar Assembly constituency of Lakhimpur Kheri district, Uttar Pradesh from 1957 to 1962.

== Early life ==
Vanshidhar Shukla was born on 23 January 1904 in Manyora village, Lakhimpur district, Uttar Pradesh, India, and belonged to a farming family. His father, Chhedilal Shukla, was also a farmer and poet, known for his Alha performances, a form of folk narrative singing. After his father's death in 1919, he took on family responsibilities. By 1925, inspired by Ganesh Shankar Vidyarthi, he became active in the Indian independence movement.

== Work ==
He composed literature dedicated entirely to the independence movement. In 1921, He became fully active in politics, and in 1928, he joined the Congress on Mahatma Gandhi's call. After the Dum Dum incident, Vanshidhar Shukla wrote a revolutionary poem called Khooni Parcha, which became highly popular at the time and was released nationwide in 1928. After the Kheri bomb incident, Shukla's house was raided by the police, and they confiscated revolutionary literature, and he was sentenced to six months in jail. He openly participated in the Swadeshi movement and Gandhiji's Salt Satyagraha. Despite facing challenges, he remained determined to assist revolutionaries. In 1940, he was sentenced to three years' imprisonment and faced several other jail terms during the freedom movement.

Some of his notable poetic works include Utho Sone Waalo, Savera Hua hai, Watan Ke Fakiro ka Fera hua hai, Uth Jaag Musafir, Bhor Bhayo, Qadam Qadam Badhaye Ja, and Mera Rang De Basanti Chola. His compilation of poems Vanshidhar Shukla Rachnavali has been published by the Uttar Pradesh Hindi Sansthan, Government of Uttar Pradesh. He established the 'Gandhi Vidyalaya' in Lakhimpur Kheri city in honour of Mahatma Gandhi.

== Politics ==
After India's independence, he contested and won the legislative assembly elections held in 1957, becoming a Member of the Uttar Pradesh Legislative Assembly. He served as an MLA from 1957 to 1962, representing the Sri Nagar Assembly constituency of Lakhimpur Kheri district. However, he chose not to accept the MLA salary allowance.

== Award and recognition ==
In 1978, Vanshidhar Shukla was awarded the Malik Muhammad Jayasi Award, with a cash prize of ₹5000, by the Uttar Pradesh Hindi Sansthan, Lucknow, Government of Uttar Pradesh.

In 1977, he was felicitated by the state government of Uttar Pradesh at Lucknow University in a ceremony chaired by storyteller Amritlal Nagar, and attended by prominent Indian writers. In 1953, he was honoured by the Akhil Bharatiya Abhinandan Hindi Sahitya Parishad, Lakhimpur Kheri and by the Hindi Sahitya Sammelan, Prayag. From 1962 to 1969, he received multiple honours from Lucknow's Hindi community and the Awadh Academi of Bahraich.

== Legacy ==
Research has been conducted on Vanshidhar Shukla's works at several universities, and Kanpur University has included his works in the Hindi curriculum. A road in Lakhimpur has been named after him. A biography titled Pandit Vanshidhar Shukla: Vyakti Aur Rachnakar, authored by Seema Pandey and published by Pilgrim Publishing, Varanasi. The Uttar Pradesh Hindi Sansthan established an award in his honour, known as the "Vanshidhar Shukla Sarjana Puraskar", which is presented annually to writers for their contributions to Awadhi literature.
