= Urmilesh Shankhdhar =

Indian Hindi-language poet and writer (1951-2005)

- Urmilesh Shankhdhar
- Born: 6 July 1951; Islamnagar, Badaun, Uttar Pradesh, India
- Died: 16 May 2005 (aged 53)
- Education: BA, MA, Ph.D.
- Alma mater: Agra University (MA)
- Occupations: Poet, Writer, Activist
- Children: 3, including Sonroopa Vishal
- Parent: Pandit Bhoopram Sharma "Bhoop" (father)
- Writing career
- Pen name: Dr. Urmilesh
- Language: Hindi
- Genre: Poetry
- Notable awards: Yash Bharti (2007)

Urmilesh Shankhdhar (6 July 1951 – 16 May 2005) was an Indian Hindi-language poet, writer and lyricist. He was one of the popular poets of contemporary Hindi literature. He was awarded Yash Bharti, the highest award of the Government of Uttar Pradesh, posthumously in 2007. Shankhdhar was a professor of Hindi department in Nehru Memorial Shivnarayan Das Memorial College, Budaun.

== Biography ==
He was born on 6 July 1951 in Islamnagar of Badaun district, India. His native place is Bhatri Govardhanpur village of Budaun district. He was the son of poet Pandit Bhoopram Sharma "Bhoop". He was a gold medalist from Agra University in M.A. Hindi. He completed his B.A. from SM College, Chandauli. He holds a Ph.D. from Agra College, Agra.

In August 1972, Shankhdhar was appointed as a professor in the Hindi Department of NMSN Das College in Budaun. Later, he became president of the Readers and Hindi department.

Some of his published notable works include Dr. Urmilesh Ki Ghazale, Faisala Vah Bhi Galat Tha, Dhoop Nikalegi, Sot Nadi Bahti Hai, Chiranjeev Hain Hum, Jagaran Ki Dehri Par, Bimb Kuchh Ubharte Hain, Ghar Bunte Akshar, Vardanon Ki Pandulipi, Gandho Ki Jaagir, Aaina Aah Bharte Hai and Akshat Yugmaan Ke Sareekhe. His poetry collection, Sot Nadi Bahti Hai, was awarded by the Uttar Pradesh Hindi Sansthan.

He founded Budaun Mahotsav, a cultural fest organized in Budaun, Uttar Pradesh. He founded many literary organizations such as Manch, Anchala, Yuvjan, Kavita Chali Gaanv Ki Or. Dr. Urmilesh received various honorary titles such as Geet Gandharva, Kavi Bhushan, Rashtra Kavi (National Poet), Bharat Shree, Loktantrik Geetkar (Democratic poet), Sahitya Saraswat, Acharyashree and Yugacharan. He made his significant contribution to the environment, literacy, national unity, and Polio eradication.

== Selected works ==
- Dr. Urmilesh Ki Ghazale
- Pahchaan Aur Parakh
- Faisala Vah Bhi Galat Tha
- Dhoop Nikalegi
- Sot Nadi Bahti Hai
- Chiranjeev Hain Hum
- Baadh Me Doobi Nadi
- Dhuan Cheerte Hue
- Jagaran Ki Dehri Par
- Bimb Kuchh Ubharte Hain
- Ghar Bunte Akshar
- Vardano Ki Pandulipi
- Gandho Ki Jaagir
- Aaina Aah Bharte Hai
- Akshat Yugmaan Ke Sareekhe

== Cassettes ==
- Dr. Urmilesh Cassettes (by Vinay Cassette, Neemuch)
- Dr. Urmilesh Ke Geet (by Vishnu Saxena)
- Aapka Saath (by Sonroopa Vishal)
- Dharohar Ki Shabdanjali (by Shivoham Sahityik Manch)
- Vande Mataram (by Vinay Cassette)
- Zindagi Se Jung (by Manjul Cassettes, Budaun)
- Swaranjali (by Sharma Bandhu)

== Awards ==
- Yash Bharti Award - highest Award of Uttar Pradesh Government, 2007
- Late Ramji Sharan Saxena Award, by Parikrama, Bareilly, 1989
- Bharati Award, by the Madhya Pradesh Sahitya Kala Parishad, Sarguja, 1990
- Nazir-Nirala Hindi Kavita Award, by Lokamangal, Agra, 1992
- Dinkar Sahitya Award, by the Akhil Bharatiya Sahitya Parishad, Rajasthan, 1992
- Rashtriya Aatma Puraskar, by the Mahakavi Rashtriya Aatma Smarak Samiti, Kanpur, 1994
- Premchand Lekhak Puraskar, by the Maharashtra Dalit Sahitya Academy, 1999

== Death ==
He died of a brain hemorrhage on May 16, 2005. With the special direction of then Chief Minister of UP, Mulayam Singh Yadav, he was cremated on the bank of river Ganga in Kachhla with state honour.

== Legacy ==
A public library named Dr. Urmillesh Smriti Pustakalaya has been set up at the Budaun railway station by the Indian Railways, Government of India, is dedicated to him. It was established in 2011 by NorthEastern Railway.

In March 2020, Rail Pragya, a magazine of Indian Railways, published by the Department of Official Language, Ministry of Home Affairs, released a special issue in memory of Dr. Urmilesh.
