= Ghagh =

17th-century Indian poet and philosopher

- Born: Chaudhary Sarai near Kannauj (present-day Uttar Pradesh, India)
- Spouse: Bhaddari or Ghaghini
- Writing career
- Period: 17th century
- Genres: Poetry, Proverbs
- Subjects: Farmers, Agriculture, Human life, Natural methodology, Environment
- Notable works: Ghagh ki kahavatein, Ghagh ki kavitayen

Ghagh was a 17th-century poet, philosopher and Brahmin astrologer from Northern India. He is known for writing poetry and proverbs on farmers and agriculture. His proverbs are popular among folks in the Hindi-speaking regions like Haryana, Rajasthan, Uttar Pradesh and Madhya Pradesh to the eastern boundaries of Bihar.

== Biography ==
According to a legend, Ghagh was born in the village called Chaudhary Sarai near Kannauj, which is located in central Uttar Pradesh, during Mughal emperor Akbar's reign in the 16th century. It is also believed that Ghagh settled in a village called Ghagh Sarai, a few kilometers away from Kannauj, on a piece of land that Akbar gifted. He had received an honorary title, Chowdhary by Akbar. Ghagh's father was a Brahmin scholar and astrologer.

According to some sources, his birth name was Bhaddar or Bhaddari and some say it was his wife's name. Some of his poems hint that he lovingly addresses his wife as Ghaghini.

His poetry suggests that he had a great knowledge of agriculture, farming and all things related to human life. His poetry and speeches are scattered in the form of proverbs, which many people have collected and published. Among these, Ghagh and Bhaddri, compiled by Ramnaresh Tripathi (published by Hindustani Academy, 1931 AD), is a critical compilation.

== Works ==
There is no extant book published under the authorship of Ghagh himself but there are many that compile Ghagh's poetry and proverbs. His poetry books can be found selling at rural fairs, railway station book kiosks and roadside booksellers in the vast Hindi belt. Common titles of these books are Ghagh ki kahavatein (Sayings of Ghagh) and Ghagh ki kavitayen (Poetry of Ghagh).

Some of the books which compile Ghagh's work or talks about Ghagh are as follows:

- Ghagh aur Bhaddari ki lokoktiya. Chaukhamba. 2011. ISBN 978-8190188791. (authored by Dr. Kiran Tripathi)
- Sayings of Ghagh Bhaddari (Agricultural and Natural Meteorology). ASIN B09BZPVJS1 (published by Rupesh)
- Lokpriya Kavi Giridhar Kavirai Ghagh Vemanna. Gautam Book Centre. ISBN 978-9380292366. (edited by Dr. R.M.S. Vijayi, S.S. Gautam)
- Dwivedi, Devnarayan (2006). Ghagh Aur Bhaddari Ki Kahawatein. Diamond Pocket Books (P). ISBN 978-8128813689. (compiled by Devnarayan Diwedi)
- Cakravartī, Dīpana Kumāra (2020). Ghagh Aur Bhaddari. Luminas Buksa. ISBN 978-8194959908. (authored by Dipan Kumar Chakarvarti)
- Mahakavi Ghagh Aur Bhaddari Ki Kahavaten. Raj Shree Prakashan. 2016. ISBN 978-8184251630. (compiled by Ganga Prasad Sharma)
- Ghagh Aur Bhaddari Ki Kahavatein. Uttar Pradesh Hindi Sansthann, Lucknow. ISBN 978-9382175773. (edited by Ramesh Pratap Singh)
- Ghagh Bhdduri Ki Khawtein Krishi And Prakrtik Mausam Vigyan. Jyotish Prakashan. 2011.
