= C. M. Naim =

Indian-American scholar of Urdu language and literature (1936–2025)

- Born: Choudhri Mohammed Naim; 3 June 1936; Barabanki, United Provinces of Agra and Oudh, British India
- Died: 9 July 2025 (aged 89)
- Citizenship: United States
- Education: Lucknow University; Deccan College; University of California, Berkeley
- Occupation: Scholar
- Employer: University of Chicago
- Spouse: Candace R. Caveny
- Children: 2

Choudhri Mohammed Naim (3 June 1936 – 9 July 2025) was an Indian-born American scholar of Urdu language and literature. He was professor emeritus at the University of Chicago.

Naim was the founding editor of both Annual of Urdu Studies and Mahfil (now Journal of South Asian Literature), as well as the author of the definitive textbook for Urdu pedagogy in English.

== Life and career ==
Naim was born on 3 June 1936 in Barabanki, British India, the son of Choudhri Mohammed Masud and Naima Masud. He was educated at Lucknow University (BA Honours, 1954 and MA in Urdu, 1955), Deccan College, Pune, and the University of California, Berkeley (MA in Linguistics, 1961). He served as a lecturer at University of California, Berkeley from 1960 to 1961.

In 1961, he joined the faculty of the Department of South Asian Languages and Civilizations at the University of Chicago as a research fellow, he served for a year before being promoted to a lecturer (1962), instructor (1963), assistant professor (1968) and associate professor (1971). He chaired the Department of South Asian Languages and Civilizations from 1985 to 1991. He retired in 2001. He also served as a visiting associate professor Aligarh Muslim University from 1971 to 1972 and a visiting professor at the Jamia Millia Islamia, New Delhi, in 2003. He was a national fellow at the Indian Institute of Advanced Study, Shimla, in 2009

Naim married Candace R. Caveny and they had 2 children. He died on 9 July 2025, at the age of 89.

== Bibliography ==
- Urdu Reader (with John Gumperz). Berkeley: Center for South Asia Studies, University of California (1960).
- Conversational Hindi-Urdu, 2 vols. (with John Gumperz, June Romery and A. B. Singh). Berkeley: ASUC Store, University of California (1963).
- Readings in Urdu: Prose and Poetry. Honolulu: East-West Center Press, for the South Asia Language and Area Center, University of Hawaii (1965).
- Iqbal, Jinnah and Pakistan: The Vision and the Reality. Ed. by C. M. Naim. Syracuse: Maxwell School of Citizenship and Public Affairs, Syracuse University (1979).
- "Two Days in Palestine" (later re-titled "In the Eye of the Intifada, A Muslim's Journey to the Land of Oppression"). 1989. Article for the magazine The Message International.
- Curfew in the City: Novella by Vibhuti Narain Rai (translated from Hindi). New Delhi: Roli Books, 1998.
- Zikr-i Mir: The Autobiography of the Eighteenth Century Mughal Poet Mir Muhammad Taqi 'Mir' translated from the Persian, with annotation and introduction). New Delhi: Oxford University Press, 1999.
- Ambiguities of Heritage: Fictions and Polemics. Karachi: City Books, 1999.
- A Season of Betrayals: A Short Story and Two Novellas by Qurratulain Hyder (translated from Urdu). New Delhi: Kali for Women, 1999.
- Introductory Urdu, 2 vols. Chicago: Committee on Southern Asian Studies, University of Chicago, 1975. Revised edition, 1980. Third revised edition, 1999. Also published, New Delhi: Council for the Promotion of Urdu Language, 2000.
- Inspector Matadeen on the Moon: selected satires of Harishankar Parsai (translated from Hindi). New Delhi: Katha, 2003.
- Urdu Texts and Contexts: The Selected Essays of C. M. Naim. New Delhi: Permanent Black, 2004.
- A Killing in Ferozewala: Essays / Polemics / Reviews. Karachi: City Press, 2013.
- The Muslim League in Barabanki: Essays / Polemics. Karachi: City Press, 2013.
- "The Maulana who Loved Krishna". 2013. Article about Hasrat Mohani for the Economic and Political Weekly.
- The Hijab and I: Essays/Polemics/Reviews. Karachi: City Press, 2015.
- Mir Taqi Mir: Remembrances. Edited and translated by C. M. Naim. (Murty Classical Library of India) Cambridge: Harvard University Press, 2019.
- A Most Noble Life: The Biography of Ashraffunnisa Begum (1877—1903). Edited and translated by C. M. Naim. New Delhi: Orient Blackswan, 2022.
- Urdu Crime Fiction, 1890-1950: An Informal History. Hyderabad: Orient Blackswan, 2023.
