= List of accolades received by Jodhaa Akbar =

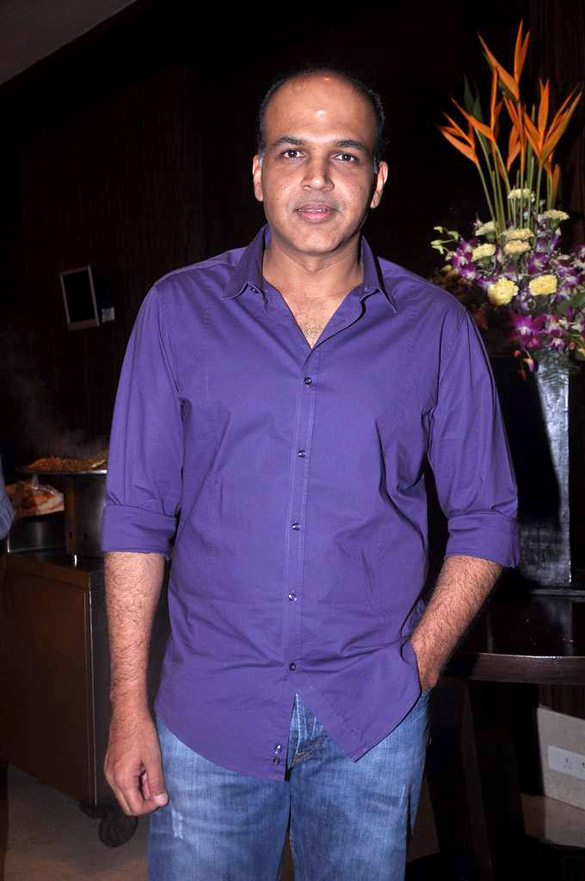
- Gowariker has garnered several awards and nominations for producing and directing Jodhaa Akbar
Accolades
| Award | Won | Nominated |
| Asian Film Awards | 0 | 2 |
| Asia Pacific Screen Awards | 0 | 1 |
| Filmfare Awards | 5 | 11 |
| Golden Minbar International Film Festival | 2 | 2 |
| International Indian Film Academy Awards | 10 | 16 |
| Mirchi Music Awards | 7 | 7 |
| National Film Awards | 2 | 2 |
| Producers Guild Film Awards | 7 | 15 |
| São Paulo International Film Festival | 1 | 1 |
| Screen Awards | 7 | 14 |
| Stardust Awards | 3 | 9 |
| V. Shantaram Awards | 4 | 4 |
- Total number of awards and nominations (Note: Awards in certain categories do not have prior nominations and only winners are announced by the jury. For simplification and to avoid errors, each award in this list has been presumed to have had a prior nomination.)
| Totals | 48 | 84 |
- References

Jodhaa Akbar is a 2008 Indian historical romance film, co-written, produced and directed by Ashutosh Gowariker. It stars Aishwarya Rai and Hrithik Roshan in the lead roles, with Sonu Sood, Kulbhushan Kharbanda and Ila Arun in supporting roles. Acclaimed composer A. R. Rahman composed the musical score. Set in the 16th century, the film centers on the romance between the Mughal Emperor Jalal-ud-din Muhammad Akbar, played by Hrithik Roshan, and the Rajput Princess Jodhaa Bai who becomes his wife, played by Aishwarya Rai.

Produced on a budget of ₹400 million, Jodhaa Akbar was released on 15 February 2008 and grossed ₹1.2 billion. The film was cited as "10 Great Bollywood Films of the 21st Century" by British Film Institute. The film garnered awards and nominations in several categories, with particular praise for its direction, music, cinematography, costume design, choreography and lead performances (Aishwarya and Hrithik). The film won 48 awards from 84 nominations.

== Awards and nominations ==
| Award (Note: Awards, festivals and organizations are in Alphabetical order.) | Date of ceremony (Note: Date is linked to the article about the awards held that year, wherever possible.) | Category | Recipient(s) | Result | Ref. |
|---|---|---|---|---|---|
| Asian Film Awards | 23 March 2009 | Best Composer | A. R. Rahman | Nominated | |
| Asian Film Awards | 23 March 2009 | Best Production Designer | Nitin Chandrakant Desai | Nominated | |
| Asia Pacific Screen Awards | 14 November 2008 | Achievement in Cinematography | Kiran Deohans | Nominated | |
| Filmfare Awards | 28 February 2009 | Best Film | Ashutosh Gowariker Productions | Won | |
| Filmfare Awards | 28 February 2009 | Best Director | Ashutosh Gowariker | Won | |
| Filmfare Awards | 28 February 2009 | Best Dialogue | K. P. Saxena | Nominated | |
| Filmfare Awards | 28 February 2009 | Best Actor | Hrithik Roshan | Won | |
| Filmfare Awards | 28 February 2009 | Best Actress | Aishwarya Rai Bachchan | Nominated | |
| Filmfare Awards | 28 February 2009 | Best Supporting Actor | Sonu Sood | Nominated | |
| Filmfare Awards | 28 February 2009 | Best Music Director | A. R. Rahman | Nominated | |
| Filmfare Awards | 28 February 2009 | Best Background Score | A. R. Rahman | Won | |
| Filmfare Awards | 28 February 2009 | Best Lyricist | Javed Akhtar ("Jashn-E-Bahara") | Won | |
| Filmfare Awards | 28 February 2009 | Best Male Playback Singer | Sonu Nigam ("Inn Lamho Ke Daaman Mein") | Nominated | |
| Filmfare Awards | 28 February 2009 | Best Scene of the Year | Jodhaa Akbar | Nominated | |
| Golden Minbar International Film Festival | 23 October 2008 | Best Film – Grand Pix (Note: Shared with Mim Mesle Madar, an Iranian film.) | Ashutosh Gowariker & Ronnie Screwvala | Won | |
| Golden Minbar International Film Festival | 23 October 2008 | Best Actor | Hrithik Roshan | Won | |
| International Indian Film Academy Awards | 11–13 June 2009 | Best Film | Ashutosh Gowariker Productions | Won | |
| International Indian Film Academy Awards | 11–13 June 2009 | Best Director | Ashutosh Gowariker | Won | |
| International Indian Film Academy Awards | 11–13 June 2009 | Best Actor | Hrithik Roshan | Won | |
| International Indian Film Academy Awards | 11–13 June 2009 | Best Actress | Aishwarya Rai Bachchan | Nominated | |
| International Indian Film Academy Awards | 11–13 June 2009 | Best Supporting Actor | Sonu Sood | Nominated | |
| International Indian Film Academy Awards | 11–13 June 2009 | Best Supporting Actress | Ila Arun | Nominated | |
| International Indian Film Academy Awards | 11–13 June 2009 | Best Performance in a Comic Role | Tejpal Singh | Nominated | |
| International Indian Film Academy Awards | 11–13 June 2009 | Best Performance in a Negative Role | Vishwa S. Badola | Nominated | |
| International Indian Film Academy Awards | 11–13 June 2009 | Best Music Director | A. R. Rahman | Won | |
| International Indian Film Academy Awards | 11–13 June 2009 | Best Lyricist | Javed Akhtar ("Jashn-E-Bahara") | Won | |
| International Indian Film Academy Awards | 11–13 June 2009 | Best Male Playback Singer | Javed Ali ("Jashn-E-Bahara") | Won | |
| International Indian Film Academy Awards | 11–13 June 2009 | Best Female Playback Singer | Bela Shende ("Mann Mohana") | Nominated | |
| International Indian Film Academy Awards | 11–13 June 2009 | Best Art Direction | Nitin Chandrakant Desai | Won | |
| International Indian Film Academy Awards | 11–13 June 2009 | Best Costume Design | Neeta Lulla | Won | |
| International Indian Film Academy Awards | 11–13 June 2009 | Best Editing | Ballu Saluja | Won | |
| International Indian Film Academy Awards | 11–13 June 2009 | Best Makeup | Madhav Kadam | Won | |
| Mirchi Music Awards | 28 March 2009 | Song of The Year | "Jashn-E-Bahara" | Won | |
| Mirchi Music Awards | 28 March 2009 | Male Vocalist of The Year | Javed Ali ("Jashn-E-Bahara") | Won | |
| Mirchi Music Awards | 28 March 2009 | Female Vocalist of The Year | Bela Shende ("Mann Mohana") | Won | |
| Mirchi Music Awards | 28 March 2009 | Lyricist of The Year | Javed Akhtar ("Jashn-E-Bahara") | Won | |
| Mirchi Music Awards | 28 March 2009 | Best Song Arranger & Programmer | TR Krishna Chetan ("Jashn-E-Bahara") | Won | |
| Mirchi Music Awards | 28 March 2009 | Best Song Mixing & Engineering | H. Sridhar | Won | |
| Mirchi Music Awards | 28 March 2009 | Best Background Score | A. R. Rahman | Won | |
| National Film Awards | 20 March 2010 | Best Costume Design | Neeta Lulla | Won | |
| National Film Awards | 20 March 2010 | Best Choreography | Chinni Prakash & Rekha Prakash ("Azeem-o-Shaan Shahenshah") | Won | |
| Producers Guild Film Awards (Note: Previously known as Apsara Film & Television Producers Guild Awards.) | 5 December 2009 | Best Film | Ashutosh Gowariker & Ronnie Screwvala | Nominated | |
| Producers Guild Film Awards | 5 December 2009 | Best Director | Ashutosh Gowariker | Nominated | |
| Producers Guild Film Awards | 5 December 2009 | Best Story | Haidar Ali | Nominated | |
| Producers Guild Film Awards | 5 December 2009 | Best Dialogue | K. P. Saxena | Nominated | |
| Producers Guild Film Awards | 5 December 2009 | Best Cinematography | Kiran Deohans | Won | |
| Producers Guild Film Awards | 5 December 2009 | Best Costume Design | Neeta Lulla | Won | |
| Producers Guild Film Awards | 5 December 2009 | Best Art Director | Nitin Chandrakant Desai | Won | |
| Producers Guild Film Awards | 5 December 2009 | Best Actor in a Leading Role | Hrithik Roshan | Won | |
| Producers Guild Film Awards | 5 December 2009 | Best Actress in a Leading Role | Aishwarya Rai Bachchan | Nominated | |
| Producers Guild Film Awards | 5 December 2009 | Best Actor in a Supporting Role | Sonu Sood | Nominated | |
| Producers Guild Film Awards | 5 December 2009 | Best Music Director | A. R. Rahman | Won | |
| Producers Guild Film Awards | 5 December 2009 | Best Male Playback Singer | A. R. Rahman ("Khwaja Mere Khwaja") | Nominated | |
| Producers Guild Film Awards | 5 December 2009 | Best Lyricist | Javed Akhtar ("Jashn-E-Bahara") | Nominated | |
| Producers Guild Film Awards | 5 December 2009 | Best Choreography | Chinni Prakash & Rekha Prakash | Won | |
| Producers Guild Film Awards | 5 December 2009 | Best Re-Recording | Hitendra Ghosh | Won | |
| São Paulo International Film Festival | 3 November 2008 | Audience Award for Best Foreign Feature Film | Ashutosh Gowariker | Won | |
| Screen Awards | 14 January 2009 | Best Film | Ashutosh Gowariker & Ronnie Screwvala | Won | |
| Screen Awards | 14 January 2009 | Best Director | Ashutosh Gowariker | Won | |
| Screen Awards | 14 January 2009 | Best Art Director | Nitin Chandrakant Desai | Nominated | |
| Screen Awards | 14 January 2009 | Best Actor | Hrithik Roshan | Won | |
| Screen Awards | 14 January 2009 | Best Actress | Aishwarya Rai Bachchan | Won | |
| Screen Awards | 14 January 2009 | Best Actress (Popular Choice) | Aishwarya Rai Bachchan | Won | |
| Screen Awards | 14 January 2009 | Best Actor in a Negative Role | Ila Arun | Nominated | |
| Screen Awards | 14 January 2009 | Best Music Director | A. R. Rahman | Nominated | |
| Screen Awards | 14 January 2009 | Best Background Music | A. R. Rahman | Won | |
| Screen Awards | 14 January 2009 | Best Lyrics | Kashif ("Khwaja Mere Khwaja") | Nominated | |
| Screen Awards | 14 January 2009 | Best Male Playback Singer | A. R. Rahman ("Khwaja Mere Khwaja") | Nominated | |
| Screen Awards | 14 January 2009 | Best Choreography | Raju Khan ("Khwaja Mere Khwaja") | Won | |
| Screen Awards | 14 January 2009 | Best Action | Ravi Dewan | Nominated | |
| Screen Awards | 14 January 2009 | Best Special Effects | Pankaj Khandpur | Nominated | |
| Stardust Awards | 15 February 2009 | Best Film of the Year | Jodhaa Akbar | Nominated | |
| Stardust Awards | 15 February 2009 | Best Director | Ashutosh Gowariker | Nominated | |
| Stardust Awards | 15 February 2009 | Dream director | Ashutosh Gowariker | Won | |
| Stardust Awards | 15 February 2009 | Star of the Year Award – Male | Hrithik Roshan | Won | |
| Stardust Awards | 15 February 2009 | Star of the Year Award – Female | Aishwarya Rai Bachchan | Nominated | |
| Stardust Awards | 15 February 2009 | Breakthrough Performance – Male | Sonu Sood | Nominated | |
| Stardust Awards | 15 February 2009 | The New Menace | Nikitin Dheer | Won | |
| Stardust Awards | 15 February 2009 | Standout Performance by a Lyricist | Kashif ("Khwaja Mere Khwaja") | Nominated | |
| Stardust Awards | 15 February 2009 | New Musical Sensation – Female | Bela Shende ("Mann Mohana") | Nominated | |
| V. Shantaram Awards | 27 December 2008 | Best Director Bronze Award | Ashutosh Gowariker | Won | |
| V. Shantaram Awards | 27 December 2008 | Best Actress | Aishwarya Rai Bachchan | Won | |
| V. Shantaram Awards | 27 December 2008 | Best Music Director | A. R. Rahman | Won | |
| V. Shantaram Awards | 27 December 2008 | Best Cinematography | Kiran Deohans | Won | |

== See also ==
- List of Bollywood films of 2008
