= Kamla Srivastava =

Indian folk musician (1933–2024)

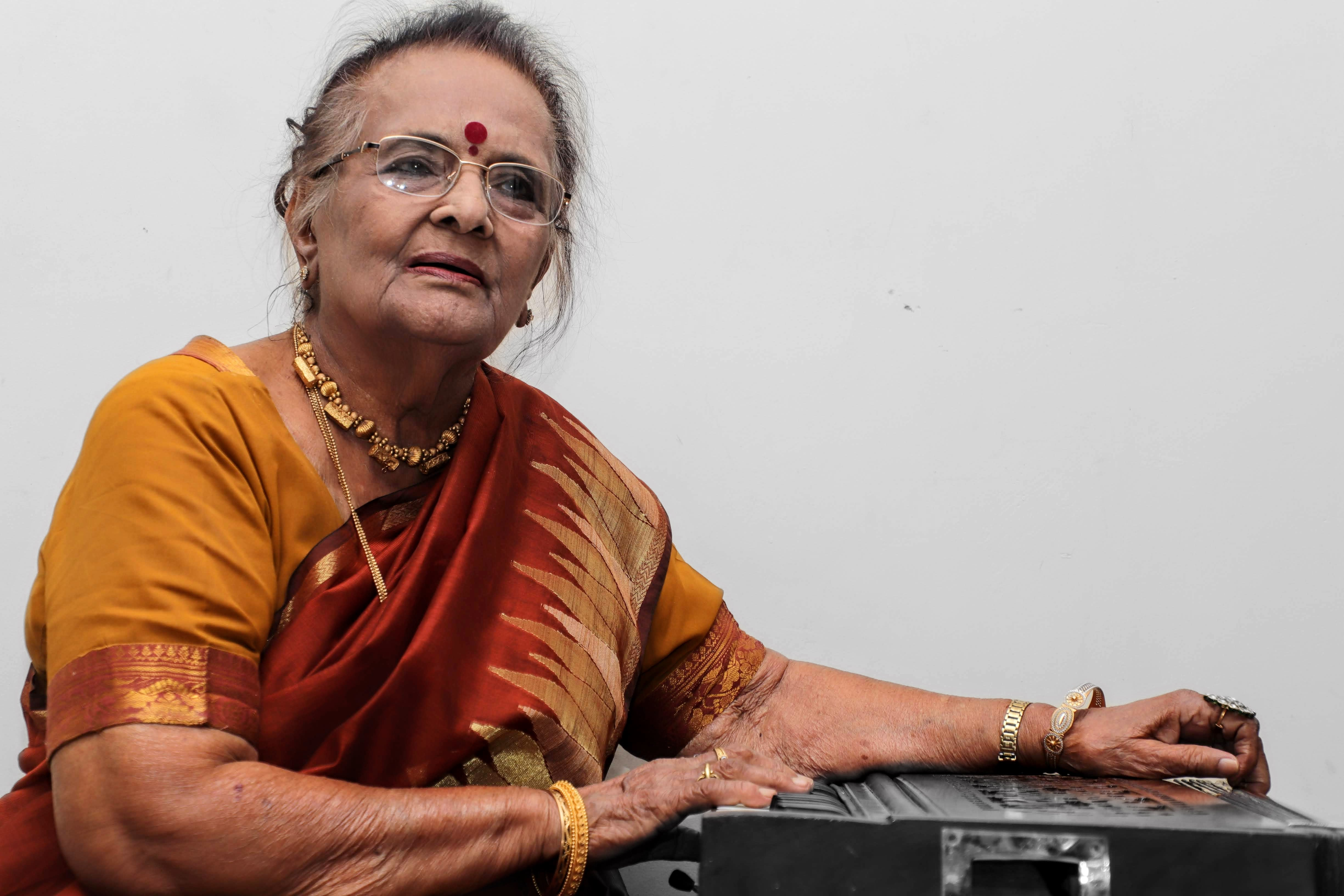

Kamla Srivastava (1 September 1933 – 4 February 2024) was an Indian folk music singer. She retired as assistant professor in Musicology-cum-practical of Bhatkhande Sanskriti Vishwavidyalaya. She came from a family of artists and poets.

== Biography ==
Srivastava sang folk, light and classical music at All India Radio, Doordarshan and Sri Lanka Radio. She was also a poet and wrote lyrics in Awadhi, Bhojpuri and Hindi.

On 8 January 2010, she published her book Geet Vatika, and received awards and citations from Sangeet Natak Academy, UP, Uttar Pradesh Sansthan and more.

Srivastava received the highest award of the Government of Uttar Pradesh, Yash Bharati, in March 2016.

Srivastava died from cardio-respiratory failure on 4 February 2024, at the age of 90. Her body was donated to King George’s Medical University (KGMU) for research as per her wishes.

== Books ==
Geet Vatika (2010)

== Awards ==
- Veerangana (2008) [Sanskar Bharti]
- Shastriya and Lok Sangeet (2010) [Sanskar Bharti]
- Lok Geet Gayan (2001) [Sangeet Natak Academy, Uttar Pradesh]
- Devi Ahilya (2013–14) [Chief Minister, Madhya Pradesh]
- Purvaiya Atithi (2014) [Purvaiya Lok Kala Sansthan]
- Gomti Gaurav (2015) [Gomti Utsav Samiti]
- Yash Bharati (2016) [Chief Minister, Uttar Pradesh]
- Sangeet Sindhu (2016) [Sur Taal Sangam Sanstha]
- Sirmaur (2017) [Rhythm Foundation, Uttar Pradesh]
- Sashakt Nari (2017) [Rudraksh Welfare Society]
- Sahitya Sangeet (2017) [Bharatiya Lekhika Parishad]
- Devi Samman (2018) [Chief Minister, Uttar Pradesh]
- Kala Sadhak (2019) [Sanskar Bharti]
- Lok Ratna (2019) [Lok Sanskriti Shodh sansthan]
- Awadh ki Shaan (2019) [Ramaneek Society]
- Women Honour (2019)
- Rang Bharti (2020)
