= Govind Kanhai =

Indian artist and painter (born 1964)

- गोविंद कन्हाई ગોવિંદ
- Born: 18 July 1964; Vrindavan, Uttar Pradesh, India
- Known for: Painting, philosophy, Writing
- Children: Parth kanhai, chaitanya kanhai, udhav kanhai, Parijat kanhai
- Parent: Kanhai Chitrakar
- Relatives: Krishn Kanhai (Brother)
- Awards: Yash Bharti Award (2015); UP Ratna Award (2006) Achiever of the Millennium Award (1999)

Signature
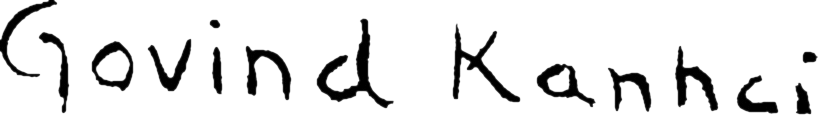

Govind Kanhai (born 7 July 1964) is an Indian artist and painter. He completed his post graduation in philosophy from Dr. Bhimrao Ambedkar University formerly known as Agra University.

== Introduction ==
Kanhai is known for his innovative techniques in oil paints, involving the use of pure gold leaf and sparkling gems. He has painted for more than 30 years and undertakes figure work, Bhava Darshan and embossing. Working with his family, he has revived the significance of tradition of gold paintings.

== Career ==
The Kanhai family has undertaken many commissions for the Parliament of India and Uttar Pradesh Legislative Assembly. He and his brother have both painted portraits of the first prime minister Jawahar Lal Nehru, former prime minister Atal Bihari Vajpayee and the former Deputy Prime Minister of India Lal Krishna Advani. In year 2007, Govind had displayed his painting at Nehru Center, Mumbai valuing about 20 million Indian rupees (approx US$300,000)

== Family ==
Govind is the son of Kanhai Chitrakar who was awarded Padma Shri for his contribution to art, by the President of India in 2000. Padma Shri (also Padmashree) is the fourth highest civilian award in the Republic of India. After his death, Hema Malini who is Member of Parliament, Lok Sabha inaugurated Padhamshree Kanhai Chitrakar Marg in honor of his memories.

Govind's elder brother Krishn Kanhai was also awarded Padma Shri in 2004.

== See also ==
- Kanhai Chitrakar
- Krishn Kanhai
- Padma Shri
