= Mannu Bhandari =

Indian writer (1931–2021)

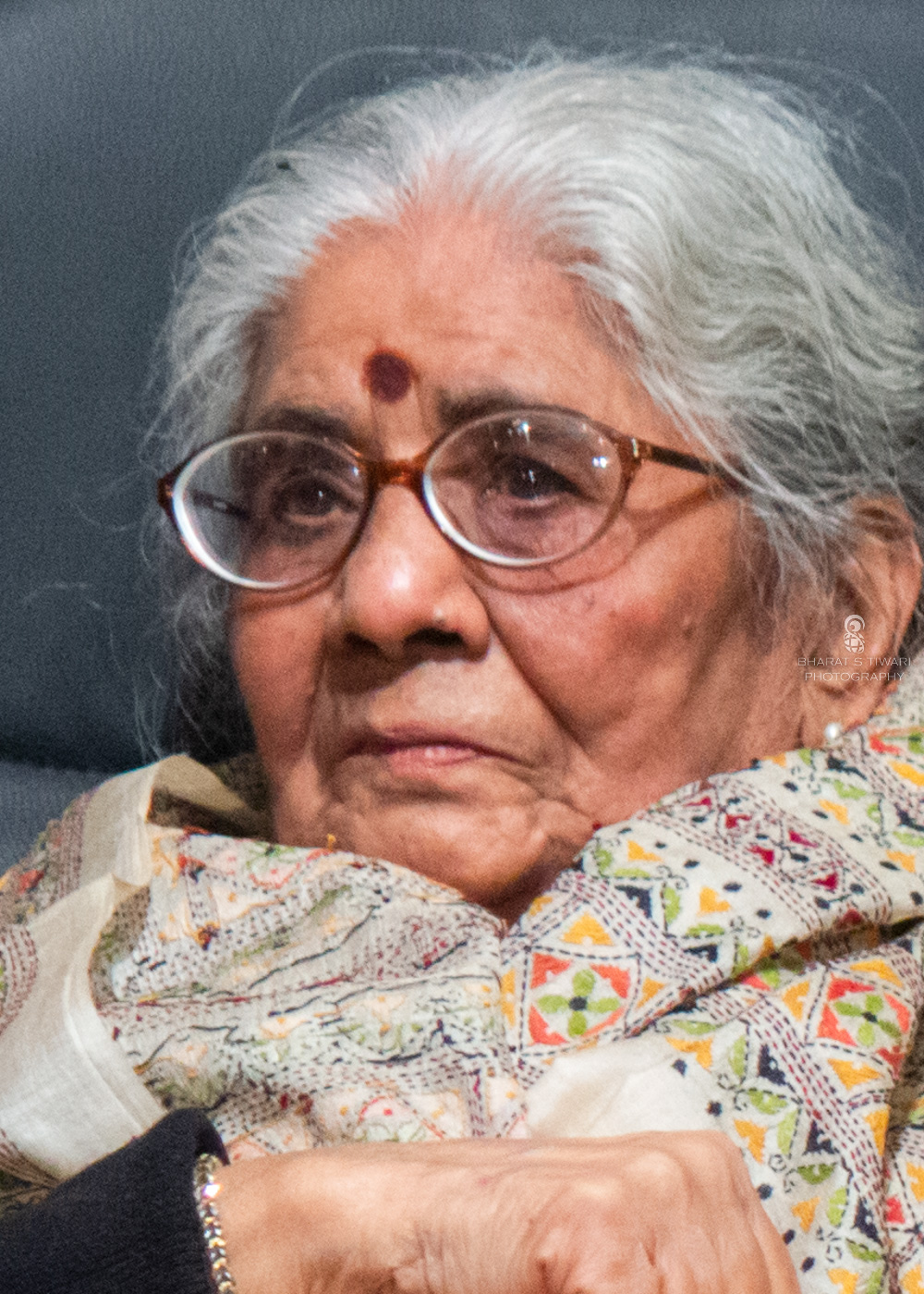
- Bhandari in 2015
- Born: 2 April 1931; Bhanpura, Indore State, British India
- Died: 15 November 2021 (aged 90); Gurgaon, Haryana, India
- Spouse: Rajendra Yadav

Mannu Bhandari (3 April 1931 – 15 November 2021) was an Indian author, screenplay writer, teacher, and playwright. Primarily known for her two Hindi novels, Aap Ka Bunty (Your Bunty) and Mahabhoj (Feast), Bhandari also wrote over 150 short stories, several other novels, screenplays for television and film, and adaptations for theatre. She was a pioneer of the Nayi Kahani movement in Hindi literature, which focused on the aspirations of the emerging Indian middle class, and her work is notable for its depiction of the inner lives of middle-class working and educated women. Her work tackles themes of family, relationships, gender equality, and caste discrimination in India.

Bhandari's writing has been extensively adapted for film and stage, including productions for Doordarshan (India's public broadcast service), the BBC, and the National School of Drama in India. Her work has been widely translated into other Indian languages from Hindi, as well as French, German and English. She received numerous awards in India for her work, including the Uttar Pradesh Hindi Sansthan and the Vyas Samman. She was one of the most notable writers in 21st-century Hindi literature, with the Indian Express describing her as a "doyenne of the Hindi literary world," after her death.

== Biography ==
=== Early life ===
Bhandari was born on 3 April 1931, in Bhanpura, Madhya Pradesh and grew up largely in Ajmer, Rajasthan, where her father Sukhsampat Rai Bhandari, was a freedom fighter, social reformer and producer of the first English to Hindi and English to Marathi dictionaries. While he was engaged in social reform as part of the Arya Samaj, a Hindu reformist institution, according to Bhandari he frequently denigrated her for her dark complexion. She was the youngest of five children (two brothers, three sisters).

=== Education and teaching career ===
Bhandari was initially educated in Ajmer, and graduated from Calcutta University in West Bengal. She went on to earn a M.A. degree in Hindi language and literature, at Banaras Hindu University. As a student she was active politically and in 1946, helped organize a strike after two of her colleagues were dismissed for being involved with Subhash Chandra Bose's Indian National Army. Bhandari initially worked as a lecturer in Hindi in Calcutta, teaching first at Ballygunge Shiksha Sadan, a primary and secondary school, and later at Kolkata’s Rani Birla College 1961–1965. After moving to Delhi with her husband, she became a lecturer in Hindi literature at Miranda House College, University of Delhi. From 1992–1994 she chaired an honorary directorship at Ujjain’s Premchand Srijanpith, in Vikram University.

=== Family ===
Bhandari married Hindi author and editor Rajendra Yadav. They met in Calcutta (now Kolkata), while Bhandari was studying at Calcutta University. Bhandari and Yadav lived in Tollygunge in Kolkata until 1964, when they moved to Delhi. They lived in Delhi thereafter and had one child, a daughter named Rachana. Bhandari and Yadav separated in the 1980s, but never divorced, remaining friends until Yadav died in 2013.

=== Death ===
Bhandari died on 15 November 2021 at the age of 90 in Gurgaon, India.

== Writings ==
=== Fiction and non-fiction ===
Bhandari's first publication was a short story titled 'Main Har Gayi' ('I Have Been Defeated') in 1957, in the Hindi Kahaani magazine. This story was later adapted to a highly popular and successful play and was performed all over the nation, including at the (Bharat Rang Mahotsav) (National Theatre Festival), in New Delhi.She followed it with a novel, Ek Inch Muskaan (One Inch Smile) in 1961, co-authored with her husband, Rajendra Yadav. Ek Inch Muskaan was an experimental novel, narrating the story of a marriage between a man and woman, with Yadav and Bhandari writing for each character in alternate chapters. The plot was devised by Bhandari, and the title, by Yadav. The book was initially serialised in a Hindi magazine, Gyanoday, and was republished as a book in 1991. Bhandari had continued to write short stories for Hindi magazines during this period, and she followed the success of Ek Inch Muskaan with four collections of short stories, which were published between 1961 and 1970.

In 1971, Bhandari published her second book, and first solo novel, titled Aap Ka Bunty (Your Bunty). It portrayed the collapse of a marriage through the eyes of a nine-year-old child, the titular Bunty, whose parents ultimately divorce and remarry other people. Bhandari took up residence temporarily at the Miranda House College in Delhi, to complete the novel. The book was initially serialised in Dharmayug, a Hindi magazine, and immediately attracted a wide readership, resulting in Bhandari receiving large amounts of fan letters and reader comments with each chapter's publication. Published to great acclaim, the novel has been described as a 'milestone and a turning point in Hindi literature', and was subsequently translated widely, including into French, Bengali, and English.

In 1979, Bhandari published her third novel, Mahabhoj. The novel was based on the massacre of Dalits in Belchhi, Bihar, in which 11 persons belonging to Dalit and Scheduled Caste communities were captured, bound, murdered, and their corpses burned, by a private militia of 'upper' caste landlords in 1977, who then feasted beside the pyre while it burned. The incident garnered widespread public attention, including personal attention from India's then Prime Minister, Indira Gandhi. Mahabhoj, meaning 'banquet' presented a fictionalised retelling of this incident, through the eyes of Bisu, a young Dalit man who was traumatized by previous massacres and attacks on marginalized Dalit communities. Bisu's attempt to investigate and hold accountable the perpetrators of these crimes results in his death and the intimidation and massacre of his entire village in the novel. Taking place amidst an electoral campaign, the novel was praised for its understanding of Dalit marginalization and political vulnerability. The novel was a commercial success, running into 31 editions as of 2021.

Bhandari continued to write short stories through her career, publishing in Hindi magazines as well as in Indian Literature, and the Journal of South Asian Literature. Bhandari published several more collections of these stories in Hindi, including Ek Plate Sailab (1962), Teen Nigahon Ki Ek Tasvir, Yahi Sach Hai, Trishanku and Sampoorna Kahaniyan.

In 2007, she published an autobiography, Ek Kahaani Yeh Bhi, describing her life, political activism, writing, and marriage.

=== Film, television, and stage ===
Bhandari's works have been frequently adapted for production in film, television, and on stage.

In 1974, a story by Bhandari titled, Yehi Sach Hai (This is the Truth) was adapted into a film by Basu Chatterjee, called Rajnigandha. Bhandari's story was about a young woman, recording her feelings about her past and present lovers, in a diary, in an attempt to choose between them. The film adaptation remained largely faithful to Bhandari's story, with some minor changes. Bhandari continued to collaborate with Chatterjee over the next few years, writing screenplays for a television serial titled Rajani. Rajani was broadcast on India's public service broadcaster, Doordarshan, and was an account of a housewife who engaged in social and political reform movements. An episode written by Bhandari, about the plight of taxi drivers, gained wide public attention, in particular. Bhandari also adapted a story by Bengali writer Sarat Chandra Chattopadhyay, for a film that Chatterjee made, titled Swami, in 1977, but disagreed publicly with Chatterjee's decision to have the heroine of the story fall at her husband's feet at the end of the film, rather than be embraced by him. In 1979, Chatterjee adapted another of Bhandari's stories into the film, Jeena Yahan, which received critical acclaim.

Following the critical and commercial success of her novel, Mahabhoj, Bhandari adapted the book for the stage. It was staged by Amal Allana for the National School of Drama in Delhi, in a production that was also commercially successful, critically acclaimed, and ran for several years. Bhandari also wrote a very successful play, titled Bina Deevaron Ke Ghar (A House Without Walls). Productions of Mahabhoj have been staged in other languages as well, including Nepali.

=== Critical reception ===
Bhandari's writing can be situated within the early stages of the Nayi Kahani movement, a Hindi literary movement in the 1950s and 1960s that focused on the aspirations and problems of the educated middle class in post-Independent, post-colonial India. The movement included several of Bhandari's contemporaries, such as her husband, the author Rajendra Yadav, as well as authors like Nirmal Verma, Bhisham Sahni, Kamleshwar. These writers reflected society in newly-independent India, as it came to terms with rapid industrialization and urbanization and wrote in a markedly realistic style, in opposition to the prevailing romantic forms of Hindi literature. Writers like Rajendra Yadav, Mohan Rakesh and Kamleshwar used the format of short stories, giving the movement the name of Nayi Kahani or New Stories; Bhandari followed this pattern, but wrote novels as well.

Women writers, such as Bhandari, and Krishna Sobti, in particular, navigated the conflicts arising from the transition of women moving from domestic roles to participation in education and employment outside the home, often depicting the tension between tradition and modernity, the desire for economic independence, and individual autonomy. Critic and writer R.S. Singh has noted on an assessment of Bhandari's oeuvre that her "...forte is the middle-class woman seeking emancipation from social and moral conservatism to develop her personality on an equal footing with man's, and thus make her existence meaningfully significant." Writer and critic Mrinal Pande wrote that Bhandari's work depicted "...reflect the strange tensions between spent old systems that continue to dominate middle-class India and the emerging new cluster of ideas," praising her work for having an honest approach to these conflicts.

Bhandari's style has been characterised by critics as marked with disregard for formal structure. This “shilpaheenata” (formlessness), according to writer Kuldeep Kumar, enabled Bhandari to focus on her skills in simple and direct narration. Her portrayal of female characters, use of irony, and symbolism have won critical acclaim. Her short stories frequently employed satire, especially when addressing political themes, such as the functioning of India's legal system, or wealth and poverty.

== Awards ==
- Uttar Pradesh Hindi Sansthan (Uttar Pradesh Hindi Institute) for Mahabhoj 1980–1981
- Bhartiya Bhasha Parishad (Indian Language Council), Kolkata, 1982
- Kala-Kunj Samman (award), New Delhi, 1982
- Bhartiya Sanskrit Sansad Katha Samaroh ( Indian Sanskrit narrative function), Kolkata, 1983
- Bihar Rajya Bhasha Parishad (Bihar State Language Council), 1991
- Rajasthan Sangeet Natak Akademi, 2001–02
- Maharashtra Rajya Hindi Sahitya Akademi (Maharashtra State Hindi Literature Akademi), 2004
- Hindi Academy, Dilli Shalaka Samman, 2006–07
- Madhya Pradesh Hindi Sahitya Sammelan (Madhya Pradesh Hindi Literature Conference), Bhavbhuti Alankaran, 2006–07
- K. K. Birla Foundation presented her with the 18th Vyas Samman for her work, Ek Kahani Yeh Bhi, an autobiographical novel.

== Bibliography ==
=== Fiction ===
- Ek Inch Muskaan (1962) (co-authored with Rajendra Yadav) ISBN 8170282446
- Aapka Bunty (1971) ISBN 978-8171194469
- Mahabhoj (1979) ISBN 9788171198399

=== Anthologies of short stories ===
- Mai Haar Gai (1957)
- Do Kalakar (Date not established, 1950s-1960s)
- Ek Plaite Sailab (1962) ISBN 978-8171197071
- Yahi Such Hai (1966) ISBN 978-8171192045
- Tin Nigahonki Ek Tasvir (1959) ISBN 978-8171197132
- Trishanku (1978) ISBN 978-8171197286
- Meri Priya Kahaniya (1973)
- Pratinidhi Kahaniya (1986) ISBN 978-8126703456
- Srestha Kahaniya (1979)
- Sampurna Kahaniya (2008)

=== Plays ===
- Bina Deevaron Ke Ghar (1966)
- Mahabhoj: Dramatisations (1981)
- Bina Divaron Ka Ghar (1965)
- Pratishodh tatha Anya Ekanki (1987)

=== Screenplay ===
- Katha-Patkatha (2003)

=== Autobiography ===
- Ek Kahaani Yeh Bhi: (2007)

=== Children's literature ===
- Aankhon Dekha Jhooth (Anthology of Stories)
- Aasmata (Fiction)
- Kala (Fiction)

== Translations and adaptations ==
=== Adaptations ===
Bhandari has been closely involved in several film, television, and stage adaptations of her works. However, her work has also been adapted by others for production. In 2017, a classical Kathak dance performance of her story, 'Trishanku' earned critical acclaim for her daughter, the choreographer and dancer Rachna Yadav, and for music composers, the Gundecha brothers. Her stories have been included in the Hindi curriculum for schools, set by the National Council of Educational Research and Training.

In 1986, Bhandari sold the rights to her second novel, Aap Ka Bunty and it was subsequently adapted for a film produced by Dharmendra Goyal and directed by Sisir Mishra. The film, Samay ki Dhara, starred Shabana Azmi, Shatrughan Sinha, Tina Munim and Vinod Mehra. Bhandari subsequently sued the filmmakers, Kala Vikas Pictures Pvt Ltd, on the grounds that the adaptation distorted her novel and consequently violated Section 57 of the Indian Copyright Act, 1957. The judgment in this case, Manu Bhandari v. Kala Vikas Motion Pictures Ltd is a landmark decision in Indian copyright law that clarified the scope of an author's moral rights under Indian copyright law. The Court held in favor of Bhandari, but she and the producers ultimately settled out of court.

Her play, Bina Deevaron Ke Ghar has been staged in Gwalior, Mumbai, and Delhi, in productions in Hindi. Marathi adaptations of her works have been staged in Goa, by the Sangeet Natak Akademi, and a Kannada translation of Mahabhoj, by Dr. Tippeswami and directed by B.V. Karant, was also staged.

In addition, Vipin Natkarni directed and translated the story Aapka Bunty which was highly praised. It earned itself a 'best story' award from the Maharashtra government and twenty-three other awards. Basu Chatterjee's directed film Trishanku was translated into Bengali and made into a feature film.

A number of films for television were created by adapting Bhandari's writing. These include:

- Telefilm based on Akeli story, shown on Delhi Doordarshan Channel
- Rajendra Nath adapted Trishanku into a telefilm for Delhi Doordarshan
- Yusuf Khan adapted Nasha into a telefilm for Lucknow Doordarshan
- Rani Maa ka Chabutara was adapted into a telefilm by Vibha Sharma for Bhopal Doordarshan
- Asamyik Mrityu was adapted into a telefilm for Delhi Doordarshan by Manju Singh
- Mahabhoj story was adapted into a telefilm by William Ash for BBC London

=== Translations ===
Bhandari wrote in Hindi, but her work has been frequently translated to Indian and foreign languages, including Kannada, Marathi, Bengali, Manipuri, French, German, Hungarian and English. A select list of translations includes:

==== Plays and fiction ====
- Ek Inch Muskaan, translated into Kannada (H.S. Parvathi)
- Aapka Bunty translated into Marathi (Indumati Shevde), Gujarati (Niranjan Sattavala), Tamil (Charu Ratnam), Kannada (H.S. Parvathi), Bengali (Renuka Vishvaas), Odiya (Saudamini Bhuyan), English (Jairatan, Sunita Jain), Japanese (translation directed by Hashimoto)
- Mahabhoj translated into Marathi (Padmakar Joshi), Bengali (Ravindranath Ghosh), Gujarati (Girish Solanki), English (Richard Williams, Ruth Vanita), French (Nicole Balbeer)
- Mahabhoj (play) translated into Marathi (Arvind Deshpande - Sangeet Natak Akademi, Goa) and Kannada

==== Compilations of stories ====
- Nine stories compiled under the name Ek Tee, translated into Marathi (Shubha Chitnis)
- Three compilations of nine stories from Satya, five stories from Uttung, and nine stories from Trishanku translated into Marathi (Chandrakant Bhonjal)
- Ten stories translated and compiled in Bengali (Gauri )
- Ten Stories translated and compiled in Manipuri (Meghchand)
- Compilation of five translated stories into English - The Dusk of Life translation (Neelam Bhandari)
- Compilation of eight stories into the language of Tajikistan (Meherunissa)
- Yahi Sach Hai translated into German and Japanese (Barbara Bomhoff)
- Rani Maa Ka Chabutra translated into French (Annie Montaut), Spanish (Alvaro Enterria)
- Nai Naukari translated into French (Kiran Chaudhary)
- Shaayad translated into Hungarian (Eva Aradi)
- Chashme translated into Dutch (Rob Van Dijk, Reinder Boverhuis, Irma Van Dam)
- Trishanku translated into German (Rosmarie Rauter), English (Charles Dent), English (Nancy Stork, Newhouse)
- Stri Subodhini translated into English (Nancy Stork-Newhouse)

== See also ==
- List of Indian writers
