= Rajendra Yadav =

Indian writer (1929–2013)

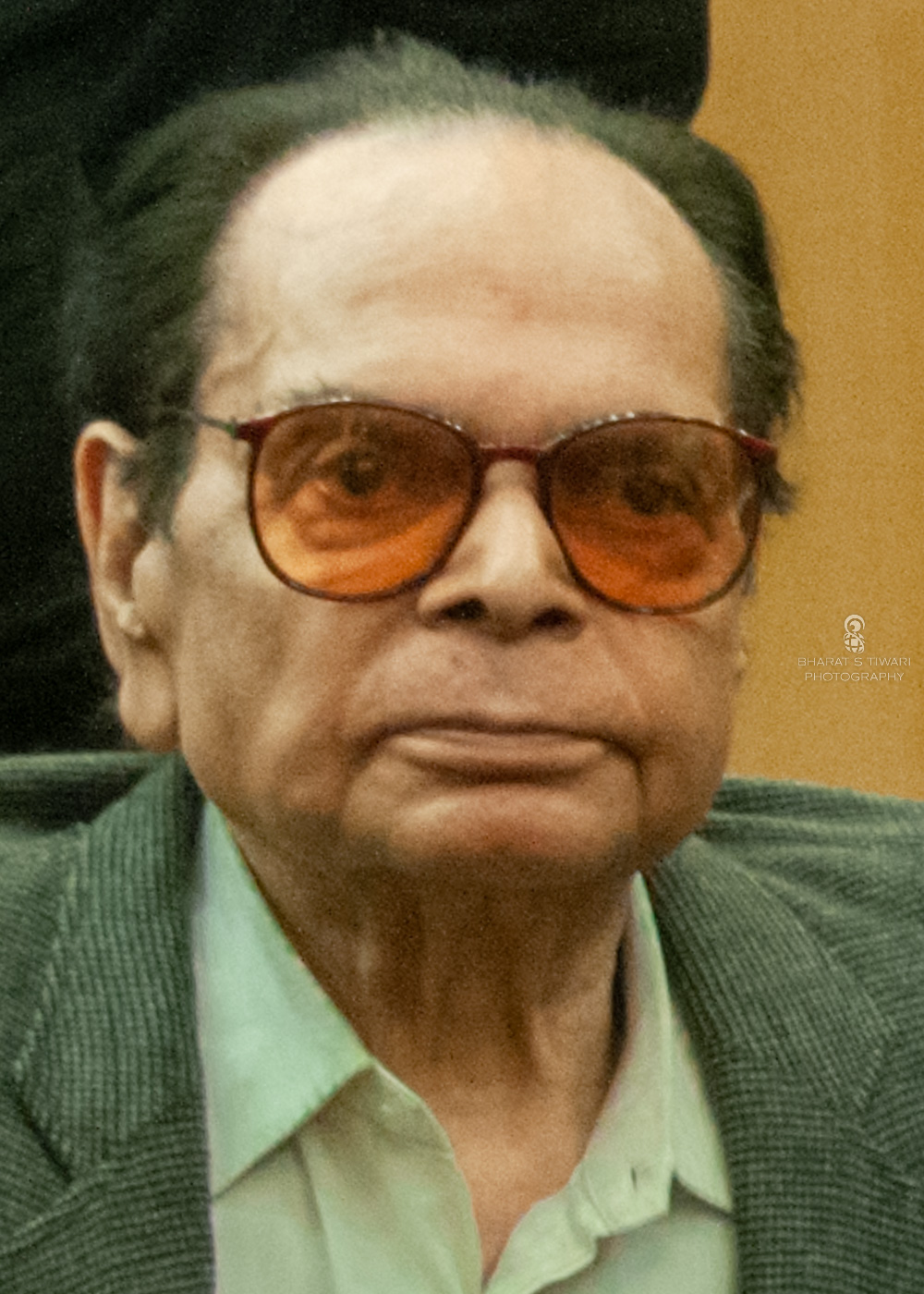
- Yadav in February 2013
- Born: 28 August 1929; Agra, United Provinces, British India
- Died: 28 October 2013 (aged 84); New Delhi, India
- Citizenship: Indian
- Occupation: Novelist
- Spouse: Manu Bhandari

Rajendra Yadav (28 August 1929 – 28 October 2013) was a Hindi fiction writer, and a pioneer of the 'Nayi Kahani' movement of Hindi literature. He edited the literary magazine HANS, which was founded by Munshi Premchand in 1930 but ceased publication in 1953 – Yadav relaunched it on 31 July 1986, (Premchand's Birthday).

His wife Manu Bhandari was a notable Hindi writer and novelist.

== Biography ==
Rajendra Yadav was born in Agra, Uttar Pradesh on 28 August 1929. He received his early education at Agra, and later also studied at Mawana, Meerut. He graduated in 1949, and later completed his MA in Hindi at Agra University in 1951.

His first novel was Pret Bolte Hain (Ghosts Speak), published in 1951 and later retitled as Sara Akash (The Infinite Cosmos) in the 1960s. It was the first Hindi novel to try to shock orthodox Indian cultural traditions. It was adapted into a movie of the same title, Sara Akash, by Basu Chatterjee in 1969 and which along with Mrinal Sen's Bhuvan Shome, launched Parallel Cinema in Hindi. The films were shot at the Yadav's ancestral home in Raja Ki Mandi, Agra.

Ukhre Huey Log, ('The Rootless People) his next novel, depicts the trauma of a couple arising out of socio-economic condition which forced them to desert the conventional path – and, still they failed to acclimatise themselves to a corrupt and devilish world. This novel envisages "living in" concept for the first time.

He wrote two more novels, Kulta (The Wayward Wife), and Shaah aur Maat (Check and Mate). He also wrote several stories and translated into Hindi many works of Russian language writers like Turgenev, Chekhov, and Lermontov (A Hero of Our Times), as also Albert Camus (The Outsider).

Ek Inch Muskaan (A Little Smile), which Rajendra Yadav and wife Mannu Bhandari wrote together, is a love tragedy of schizophrenic individuals.

Besides being a writer, Rajendra Yadav was also a nominated board member of Prasar Bharti in 1999–2001. He was awarded Yash Bharati Award of year 2013 by Government of Uttar Pradesh.

Yadav died in New Delhi on 28 October 2013. He was 84 years old when he died. Before his death, he had been admitted to hospital as he was ailing .

== Career ==
=== Writing ===
Yadav, along with fellow Hindi writers Kamleshwar and Mohan Rakesh was one of the early pioneers of the Nayi Kahani (New Story) movement in Hindi literature. His early fiction focused on the lives of the middle class, and often touched upon political issues.

=== Editing ===
As editor of Hans, a monthly literary magazine in Hindi, Yadav encouraged writing on themes surrounding questions of inequality and poverty. In his editorials for Hans, he often wrote about issues concerning feminism and Dalit empowerment, and encouraged contributions to the magazine from Dalit and women writers. His frank style occasionally courted controversy and he was once the subject of litigation after statements made by him were alleged to offend religious sentiments. He was a strong advocate of freedom of expression and expressed the opinion that the refusal of Hindi writer-editors to publish good, but controversial, literature, had directly led to the flourishing of little magazines that would publish such works.

== Selected bibliography ==
- Sara Akash, 2006
- Randua, 2015
- Ukhre Huey Log, (The Rootless People)
- Kulta (The Wayward Wife)
- Shaah aur Maat (Check and Mate).
- Strangers on the Roof, tr. by Ruth Vanita. 1994, Penguin, ISBN 0-14-024065-9.
- Ek Inch Muskaan (A Little Smile), with Manu Bhandari.
