= Jafar Mir Abdullah =

Nawab of Dehta and Dhaurera

Nawab Jafar Mir Abdullah
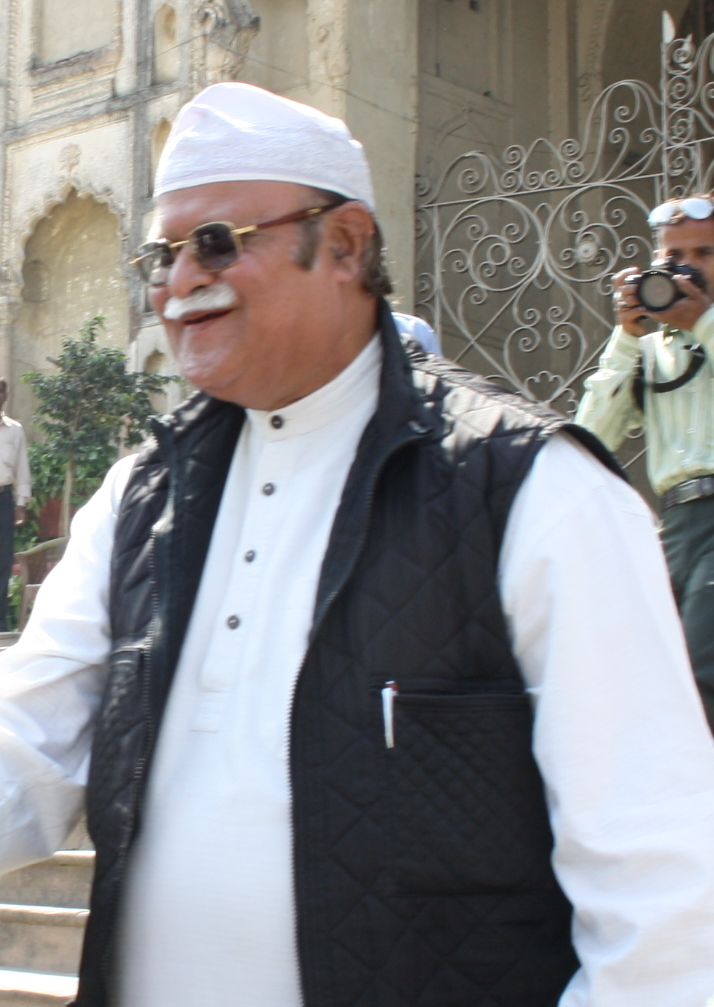
- Abdullah in 2010
- Born: 17 March 1951; Lucknow, Uttar Pradesh, India
- Died: 18 April 2023 (aged 72); Lucknow, Uttar Pradesh, India
- Education: La Martinière College, Lucknow
- Occupations: Businessperson, art enthusiast
- Known for: Cultural heritage, contributions to the art and acting
- Father: Mir Abdullah
- Family: Nawab of Awadh
- Awards: Yash Bharati

Nawab Jafar Mir Abdullah (17 March 1951 – 18 April 2023) was an Indian nobleman and art enthusiast from Lucknow, known for his deep connection to the city's cultural heritage and his contributions to the arts. Born into the royal family of Awadh, he was the Nawab of Dehta and Dhaurera. He served as a cultural and heritage ambassador of Lucknow.

He was a direct descendant of Nawab Asaf-ud-Daula, the ruler of Awadh (1775 to 1797) who commissioned the construction of the Bara Imambara in Lucknow.

He appeared in cameos in multiple films, including Umrao Jaan, Gadar, Gulabo Sitabo, Ishaqzade and Madam Chief Minister. He was also seen in the BBC miniseries A Suitable Boy, an adaptation of Vikram Seth's novel.

In 2016 he was awarded the Yash Bharati, the highest civilian award in Uttar Pradesh.

== Early life and education ==
Jafar Mir Abdullah was born as the eldest of seven children, to Mir Abdullah, a member of the royal family of Awadh in Lucknow. He studied at the La Martinière College, Lucknow, where he developed a deep appreciation for the history and culture of his city. His upbringing in a royal family instilled in him a sense of responsibility towards preserving the traditions and customs of Lucknow.

Later he obtained a degree in Bachelor of Science (H) from Aligarh Muslim University and then pursued Law at Lucknow University.

== Acting ==
Nawab was a prominent figure in the Indian entertainment industry, known for his contributions to theatre, film, and television.

=== Theatre contributions ===
He had a significant background in theatre, where he was involved in various productions that showcased the cultural heritage of Awadh. He was known for his performances in plays such as Ghalib in New Delhi, which highlighted the poetry of Mirza Ghalib, Begum Hazrat Mahal, based on the life and the reign of Nawab Wajid Ali Shah and Begum Hazrat Mahal, and The Last Mughal, which depicted the historical events surrounding the last days of the Mughal Empire.

His work in theatre was characterised by a deep understanding of the cultural narratives of his region.

=== Film career ===
His film career included cameo appearances in several Bollywood productions. He acted in Umrao Jaan, a classic film that showcased the cultural richness of Lucknow, where his ancestral home, the Sheesh Mahal, served as a filming location.

He also appeared in Gadar, Gulabo Sitabo, Ishaqzade, and Madam Chief Minister.

== Awards ==
In 2016, he received Yash Bharati Award at the Lok Bhawan in Lucknow, for his contribution to arts and handicrafts. It is the highest civilian award in Uttar Pradesh.

== Death ==
Nawab died on 18 April 2023 in Lucknow after a prolonged kidney disease. Many politicians including, then chief minister Yogi Adityanath, former CM Akhilesh Yadav, Shivpal Singh Yadav, and Mohsin Raza, posted condolence messages on social media following his death.

He is survived by his three daughters, Sheerin, Nishat and Mahrukh.
