= Kanhai Chitrakar =

Indian painter

- Born: 1934; Kolkata, India
- Died: 14 August 2013 (aged 78–79); Vrindavan
- Occupation: Painter
- Children: [Krishn Kanhai & Govind.]
- Awards: Padma Shri; AISCCON Lifetime Achievement Award<

Kanhai Chitrakar was an Indian artist and painter, credited with the revival of the heritage painting discipline of Kanhai Art, a method of painting where gold powder, gold leaves, and gemstones are used.

Kanhai Chitrakar was born in Vrindavan, in Mathura district, in the Indian state of Uttar Pradesh. His career started as an art director for the renowned filmmaker Guru Dutt, but later, he returned to Vrindavan, where he set up his studio, working in Kanhai art. The studio has since grown to become Kanhai Art Works, where he and his two sons, Krishn Kanhai and Govind Kanhai, worked producing artwork. Krishn received the Padma Shri award, and Govind received the Uttar Pradesh State Ratna Award.

A recipient of the AISCCON lifetime achievement award and the Uttar Pradesh Ratna award, Chitrakar was honored by the Government of India in 2000 with the fourth highest Indian civilian award of Padma Shri. He died on 14 August 2013.
