= Qadam Qadam Badhaye Ja =

Indian regimental march

- March by Ram Singh Thakuri
- Written: 1942
- Text: Vanshidhar Shukla
- Language: Hindustani (Hindi/Urdu)

"Qadam Qadam Badhaye Ja" (Hindi: क़दम क़दम बढ़ाये जा; Urdu: قدم قدم بڑھائے جا) was the regimental quick march of Indian National Army. Written by Vanshidhar Shukla and composed by Ram Singh Thakuri in 1942, it was banned by the British in India after World War II as seditious. The ban was lifted in August 1947 and the song has since become a patriotic anthem in India. It has been reinterpreted by various Indian musicians including C. Ramachandra, A. R. Rahman and recently by Indraadip Dasgupta in the film Gumnaami (2019) by Srijit Mukherji.

The song is currently the regimental quick march of the Indian Army.

== Lyrics ==
Devnagari script

क़दम क़दम बढ़ाये जा
ख़ुशी के गीत गाये जा
ये ज़िंदगी है क़ौम की
तू क़ौम पे लुटाये जा

तू शेर-ए-हिन्द आगे बढ़
मरने से तू कभी न डर
उड़ा के दुश्मनों का सर
जोश-ए-वतन बढ़ाये जा

क़दम क़दम बढ़ाये जा
ख़ुशी के गीत गाये जा
ये ज़िंदगी है क़ौम की
तू क़ौम पे लुटाये जा

हिम्मत तेरी बढ़ती रहे
ख़ुदा तेरी सुनता रहे
जो सामने तेरे खड़े
तू ख़ाक में मिलाये जा

क़दम क़दम बढ़ाये जा
ख़ुशी के गीत गाये जा
ये ज़िंदगी है क़ौम की
तू क़ौम पे लुटाये जा

चलो दिल्ली पुकार के
क़ौमी-निशाँ संभाल के
लाल क़िले पे गाड़ के
लहराये जा लहराये जा

क़दम क़दम बढ़ाये जा
ख़ुशी के गीत गाये जा
ये ज़िंदगी है क़ौम की
तू क़ौम पे लुटाये जा

Nastaliq script

قدم قدم بڑھائے جا
خوشی کے گیت گائے جا
یہ زندگی ہے قوم کی
تو قوم پے لٹائے جا

تو شیر ہند آگے بڑھ
مرنے سے تو کبھی نہ ڈر
اڑا کے دشمنوں کا سر
جوش وطن بڑھائے جا

قدم قدم بڑھائے جا
خوشی کے گیت گائے جا
یہ زندگی ہے قوم کی
تو قوم پے لٹائے جا

ہمت تیری بڑھتی رہے
خدا تیری سنتا رہے
جو سامنے تیرے کھڑے
تو خاک میں ملائے جا

قدم قدم بڑھائے جا
خوشی کے گیت گائے جا
یہ زندگی ہے قوم کی
تو قوم پے لٹائے جا

چلو دلی پکار کے
قومی نشاں سمبھال کے
لال قلعے پے گاڑ کے
لہرائے جا لہرائے جا

قدم قدم بڑھائے جا
خوشی کے گیت گائے جا
یہ زندگی ہے قوم کی
تو قوم پے لٹائے جا

International Phonetic Alphabet

qəd̪əm qəd̪əm bəɽʱɑːeː d͡ʒɑː
xʊʃiː keː ɡiːt̪ ɡɑːeː d͡ʒɑː
jeːʰ zɪn̪d̪əɡiː ɦɛː qɔːm kiː
t̪uː qɔːm peː lʊʈɑːeː d͡ʒɑː

t̪uː ʃeːɾe ɦɪn̪d̪ ɑːɡeː bəɽʱ
məɾneː seː t̪uː kəbʱiː nɑ ɖəɾ
ʊɽɑː keː d̪ʊʃmənõː kɑː səɾ
d͡ʒoːʃe ʋət̪ən bəɽʱɑːeː d͡ʒɑː

qəd̪əm qəd̪əm bəɽʱɑːeː d͡ʒɑː
xʊʃiː keː ɡiːt̪ ɡɑːeː d͡ʒɑː
jeːʰ zɪn̪d̪əɡiː ɦɛː qɔːm kiː
t̪uː qɔːm peː lʊʈɑːeː d͡ʒɑː

ɦɪmmət̪ t̪eːɾiː bəɽʱt̪iː ɾəɦeː
xʊd̪ɑː t̪eːɾiː sʊn̪t̪ɑː ɾəɦeː
d͡ʒoː sɑːməneː t̪eɾe kʰəɽeː
t̪uː xɑːk mẽː mɪlɑːeː d͡ʒɑː

qəd̪əm qəd̪əm bəɽʱɑːeː d͡ʒɑː
xʊʃiː keː ɡiːt̪ ɡɑːeː d͡ʒɑː
jeːʰ zɪn̪d̪əɡiː ɦɛː qɔːm kiː
t̪uː qɔːm peː lʊʈɑːeː d͡ʒɑː

t͡ʃəloː d̪ɪlliː pʊkɑːɾ keː
qɔːmiː nɪʃɑːn səmbʱɑːl keː
lɑːl qɪleː peː ɡɑːɽ keː
lɛɦɾɑːeː d͡ʒɑː lɛɦɾɑːeː d͡ʒɑː...

qəd̪əm qəd̪əm bəɽʱɑːeː d͡ʒɑː
xʊʃiː keː ɡiːt̪ ɡɑːeː d͡ʒɑː
jeːʰ zɪn̪d̪əɡiː ɦɛː qɔːm kiː
t̪uː qɔːm peː lʊʈɑːeː d͡ʒɑː

Romanized Hindustani

Qadam qadam baṛhāye jā
khushī ke gīt gāye jā
ye zindagī hai qaum kī
tū qaum pe lutāye jā

Tū sher-e-hind āge baṛh
marne se tū kabhī na dar
uṛā ke dushmanon kā sar
josh-e-watan baṛhāye jā

Qadam qadam baṛhāye jā
khushī ke gīt gāye jā
ye zindagī hai qaum kī
tū qaum pe lutāye jā

Himmat terī baṛhtī rahe
khudā terī suntā rahe
jo sāmne tere khaṛe
tū khāk men milāye jā

Qadam qadam baṛhāye jā
khushī ke gīt gāye jā
ye zindagī hai qaum kī
tū qaum pe lutāye jā

Chalo dillī pukār ke
qaumī-nishān sambhāl ke
Lāl qile pe gāṛ ke
lahrāye jā lahrāye jā

Qadam qadam baṛhāye jā
khushī ke gīt gāye jā
ye zindagī hai qaum kī
tū qaum pe lutāye jā

English translation

Keep stepping, stepping forward,
keep singing songs of happiness!
Your life belongs to the people,
spend it in their servitude!

Move forward, you, the lion of India,
don't ever be afraid of dying.
By blowing off the enemy's head,
raise the spirits of the nation!

Keep stepping, stepping forward,
keep singing songs of happiness!
Your life belongs to the people,
spend it in their servitude!

May your courage be ever increasing,
may God keep listening to you.
Whoever stands in your way,
you reduce them into dust!

Keep stepping, stepping forward,
keep singing songs of happiness!
Your life belongs to the people,
spend it in their servitude!

Shout "to Delhi",
holding the banner of the people,
plant it on the Red Fort,
let it fly, let it fly!

Keep stepping, stepping forward,
keep singing songs of happiness!
Your life belongs to the people,
spend it in their servitude!
