= Baba Yogendra =

Indian artist (1924–2022)

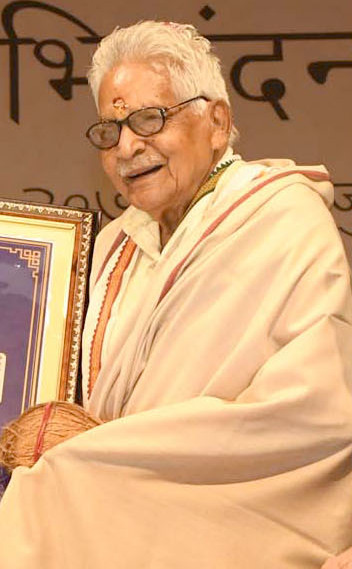
- Baba Yogendra in July 2018
- Born: 7 January 1924; Basti district, United Provinces of British India (now in Uttar Pradesh, India)
- Died: 10 June 2022 (aged 98); Lucknow, Uttar Pradesh, India
- Known for: Sanskar Bharti
- Honours: Padma Shri (2018)

Baba Yogendra (7 January 1924 – 10 June 2022) was an Indian artist, pracharak (campaigner) for Rashtriya Swayamsevak Sangh (RSS) and one of the founding members of Sanskar Bharti. He was conferred with Padma Shri, India's fourth highest civilian award, in 2018 in the field of arts.

== Early life ==
Baba Yogendra was born on 7 January 1924 in Gandhinagar, Basti district in United Provinces of British India (now in Uttar Pradesh). He was educated in Gorakhpur.

== Association with Sanskar Bharti ==
Yogendra campaigned for RSS in Gorakhpur, Allahabad, Bareilly, Budaun and Sitapur. In 1981, RSS created Sanskar Bharti, a unit to promote arts and literature. Yogendra was one of the founding members. He established himself as one of the senior pracharaks (campaigners) for RSS.

== Awards ==
In 2018, the Government of India conferred him with Padma Shri award in arts, the fourth highest civilian award of the country.

== Death ==
On 11 May 2022, Yogendra underwent cardiac arrest in Gorakhpur and was admitted to Medanta Hospital the next day. On 27 May, he was moved to Ram Manohar Lohia Hospital in Lucknow where he died on 10 June.
