= Harishankar Parsai =

Hindi language humorist and satirist

- Born: 22 August 1924; Jamani, Central Provinces and Berar, British India
- Died: 10 August 1995 (aged 70); Jabalpur, Madhya Pradesh, India
- Citizenship: Hindustani
- Education: Nagpur University
- Occupations: Writer, satirist
- Relatives: Father- Jumak Lalu Prasad Mother- Champa Bai
- Writing career
- Language: Modernized Hindi, Urdu
- Notable work: Viklaang Shraddhaa ka daur (विकलांग श्रद्धा का दौर) Pavitrata Ka Daura (पवित्रता का दौरा)
- Notable awards: Sahitya Akademi Award,1982

Harishankar Parsai (22 August 1924 – 10 August 1995) was an Indian writer who wrote in Hindi. He was a noted satirist and humorist of modern Hindi literature and is known for his simple and direct style. He wrote vyangya (satire), which described human values and nature. They reflected his critical thinking and humorous way of describing simple things with huge meanings. Parsai won the Sahitya Akademi Award in 1982, for his satire, Viklaang Shraddha ka daur.

== Biography ==
He was born on 22 August 1924 in Jamani village near Itarsi in Hoshangabad district, Madhya Pradesh. He completed his M.A. in Hindi from Nagpur University. After pursuing writing along with his service for some time, he quit his job and took writing as a full-time career.

He settled in Jabalpur and started a literature magazine called Vasudha. Despite it being highly praised, he had to stop the magazine after the publication suffered economic losses. Hari Shankar Parsai used to give answers of readers in a column "Poochhiye Parsai Se" in a Hindi newspaper Deshbandhu published from Raipur and Jabalpur. He won Sahitya Akademi Award in 1982, for his satire, "Viklaang Shraddha Ka Daur" 'विकलांग श्रद्धा का दौर'.

He remained unmarried as his financial position wasn't secure in his youth when he had a big family to support. Later on, He chose not to marry and focused on his career.

Parsai died on 10 August 1995 in Jabalpur. According to The Hindu, by thetime of his death, Parsai had revolutionized the art of satire writing in Hindi.

== Awards ==
- Sahitya Akademi Award (1982)
- Sharad Joshi Award (1992)

== Works ==
Satires

- Viklaang Shraddhaa ka daur (विकलांग श्रद्धा का दौर)
- Do Naak Waale Log (दो नाक वाले लोग)
- Aadhyaatmik Paagalon Ka Mishan (आध्यात्मिक पागलों का मिशन)
- Kraantikaaree Kee Katha (क्रांतिकारी की कथा)
- Pavitrata Ka Daura (पवित्रता का दौरा)
- Pulis-Mantree Ka Putala (पुलिस-मंत्री का पुतला)
- Vah Jo Aadamee Hai Na (वह जो आदमी है न)
- Naya Saal (नया साल)
- Ghaayal Basant (घायल बसंत)
- Sanskrti (संस्कृति)
- Baaraat Kee Vaapasee (बारात की वापसी)
- Greeting Kaard Aur Raashan Kaard (ग्रीटिंग कार्ड और राशन कार्ड)
- Ukhde Khambhe (उखड़े खंभे)
- Sharm Kee Baat Par Taalee Peetana (शर्म की बात पर ताली पीटना)
- Pitane-Pitane Mein Phark (पिटने-पिटने में फर्क)
- Badachalan (बदचलन)
- Ek Ashuddh Bevakooph (एक अशुद्ध बेवकूफ)
- Bhaarat Ko Chaahie Jaadoogar Aur Saadhu (भारत को चाहिए जादूगर और साधु)
- Bhagat Kee Gat (भगत की गत)
- Mundan (मुंडन)
- Inspektar Maataadeen Chaand Par (इंस्पेक्टर मातादीन चांद पर)
- Khetee (खेती)
- Ek Madhyamavargeey Kutta (एक मध्यमवर्गीय कुत्ता)
- Sudaama Ka Chaaval (सुदामा का चावल)
- Akaal Utsav (अकाल उत्सव)
- Khatare Aise Bhee (खतरे ऐसे भी)
- Kandhe Shravanakumaar Ke (कंधे श्रवणकुमार के)
- Das Din Ka Anashan (दस दिन का अनशन)
- Apeel Ka Jaadoo (अपील का जादू)
- Bheden Aur Bhediye (भेड़ें और भेड़िये)
- Bus ki Yatra (बस की यात्रा)
- Torch Bechnewale (टार्च बेचनेवाले)

Essays

- Aavaara Bheed Ke Khatare (आवारा भीड़ के खतरे)
- Aisa Bhee Socha Jaata Hai (ऐसा भी सोचा जाता है)
- Apni apni Beemari (अपनी अपनी बीमारी)
- Maatee Kahe Kumhaar Se (माटी कहे कुम्हार से)
- Kaag Bhagoda (काग भगोड़ा)
- Sadāchār Kā Taabij (सदाचार का तावीज़)
- Premchand Ke Phaté Jootey (प्रेमचंद के फटे जूते)
- Vaishnav Ki Fislan (वैष्णव की फ़िसलन)
- Thithurtā Huā Ganatantra (ठिठुरता हुआ गणतन्त्र)
- Pagadandiyon Ka Zamaana (पगडंडियों का ज़माना)
- Shikayat Mujhe bhi hai (शिकायत मुझे भी है)
- Tulaseedaas Chandan Ghisain (तुलसीदास चन्दन घिसैं)
- Ham Ek Umr Se Vaaqif Hain (हम एक उम्र से वाक़िफ़ हैं)
- Tab Kee Baat Aur Thee (तब की बात और थी)
- Bhoot Ke Paon Peeche (भूत के पाँव पीछे)
- Beeemaanee Kee Parat (बेईमानी की परत)

Short stories

- Jaisé Unké Din Firé (जैसे उनके दिन फिरे) (Short Story Collection)
- Bholārām kā Jeev (भोलाराम का जीव)
- Hanste Hai Rote Hai (हँसते हैंं रोते हैंं) (Short Story Collection)

Children's literature

- Chuha Aur Mein (चूहा और मैं)

Letters

- Mayaram Surjan (मायाराम सुरजन)

Novels

- Jwala Aur Jal (ज्वाला और जल)
- Tat Ki Khoj (तट की खोज)
- Rani Naagphani Ki Kahani (रानी नागफनी की कहानी)

Memoirs

- Tirchchi Rekhayein (तिरछी रेखाएं)
- Marna Koi Haar Nahi Hoti (मरना कोई हार नहीं होती)
- Seedhe-Sade Aur Jatil Muktibodh (सीधे-सादे और जटिल मुक्तिबोध)

Anecdotes

- Chande Ka Dar (चंदे का डर)
- Apna-Paraya (अपना-पराया)
- Daanee (दानी)
- Rasoi Ghar Aur Paikhana (रसोई घर और पैखाना)
- Sudhaar (सुधार)
- Samjhauta (समझौता)
- Yas Sir (यस सर)
- Ashleel (अश्लील)

== Bibliography ==
- A collection of 21 selected stories translated into English by C. M. Naim was published in 1994: Inspector Matadeen on the Moon (Manas Books, Chennai). It was reprinted in 2003 by Katha Press, New Delhi.
- Several stories and essays, like ‘Baarat Kee Waapsi’ and ‘Premchand Ke Phaté Jootey’, are also part of the school curriculum in Central Board of Secondary Education and available in NCERT books.

== In popular culture ==
Parsai Kehate Hain is an Indian television show which adapted several works of Harishankar Parsai into episodic stories aired on DD National in the early 2000s.
