= Manu Bhandari v. Kala Vikas Motion Pictures Ltd. =

Indian legal case

Mannu Bhandari v. Kala Vikas Motion Pictures Ltd (AIR 1987 Delhi 13) is a landmark case in the area of Indian copyright law. It is the first decision from the Indian higher judiciary that clarified the scope and ambit of moral rights under the Indian copyright law.

== Facts of the case ==
The plaintiff in this case, Mannu Bhandari, was a famous Hindi language novelist. The defendant produced a motion picture titled Samay Ki Dhara based on plaintiff's novel Aap Ka Bunty. Though the movie was made under an agreement with the plaintiff, the plaintiff was not happy with the way her work was treated during the adaptation of the novel into the movie. The plaintiff feared that her image would be tarnished if the distorted version of her novel was allowed to be presented through the movie. Hence the plaintiff sought permanent injunction against the screening and exhibition of the movie. Though the parties in the case reached a settlement before the judgment was delivered by the Court, the parties requested the Court to deliver its judgment, as the scope of protection of moral rights in India had not yet been clarified by the higher judiciary in India.

== Most important issue discussed by the Court ==
What is the scope and ambit of Section 57 of the Copyright Act, 1957?

== Key aspects of the judgement ==
The court clarified the following important observations in this case -

- Section 57 of the Copyright Act, 1957, which deals with moral rights protection in India, lifts the author's status beyond the material gains of copyright and gives it a special status.
- Author's right to restrain distortion of his work is not limited to cases of literary reproduction of his work. The restraint order in the nature of injunction can be passed even in cases where a film is produced based on the author's novel.
- The language of section 57 is of the widest amplitude and cannot be restricted to ‘literary’ expression only. Visual and audio manifestations are directly covered.
- The special protection given to the author's under the Indian copyright law is emphasised by the fact that the remedies of a restraint order or damages can be claimed "even after the assignment either wholly or partially of the said copyright"
- Section 57 thus clearly over-rides the terms of the contract of assignment of copyright. To put it differently, any contract of assignment has to be read subject to the provisions of Section 57 and the terms of contract cannot negate the special rights and remedies guaranteed by Section 57.
- By reading the contract with section 57, it is obvious that modifications, which are permissible, are such modifications, which do not convert the film into an entirely new version from the original novel.
- The modifications should not distort or mutilate the original novel.

After giving due consideration to the facts of the case, the court directed the defendant in this case to make certain modifications and deletions in the movie before screening it. However, as the parties had reached a settlement before the judgment was pronounced, the court didn't enforce its findings.

== Relevance of the decision from a comparative perspective ==
Civil law countries like France and Germany give high importance to moral rights protection. For example, German copyright law protects three kinds of moral rights: Right of attribution, integrity, and disclosure. So from a comparative perspective, these countries define moral rights much more widely than India does. On the other hand, the concept of moral rights has witnessed strong resistance in the United States. In 1990, the United States recognized, for the first time, a limited set of moral rights for a limited class of works. These were set out in the “Visual Artists Rights Act” of 1990, and are now embodied in Section 106-A of the American Copyright Act of 1976. Section 106-A does not extend to a host of works such as films that are protected under European moral rights regime.
