= K. P. Saxena =

Indian satirist and writer

K.P. Saxena
- Born: 13 April 1932; Lucknow, United Provinces of Agra and Oudh, British India
- Died: 31 October 2013 (aged 81); Lucknow, Uttar Pradesh, India
- Occupation: Writer
- Years active: 1982–2013 (in books, magazines and serials) 2001–2013 (in films)

K. P. Saxena was an Indian satirist and writer. He was employed by the Indian Railways and was a prolific writer for magazines and newspapers. He started writing for Doordarshan's famous serial Bibi Natiyon Wali. He wrote vyangya (hindi satire) articles for almost every popular magazine of Hindi. His first book of satire Koi Patthar Se Na Mare was published in 1982. His style is unique and he is very popular among poets in Kavi Sammelans. He was an expert of three Indian language Urdu, Hindi and Awadhi. He was awarded Padma Shri by Government of India, in year 2000. He died on 31 October 2013. He was a regular in Hindi Kavi Sammelan.

== Biography ==
He hailed from Lucknow. He completed his BSc and MSc in Botany from University of Lucknow.

His eyes and brows asked as well as answered questions as the mouth was often engaged in chewing the succulent 'paan ki gilauri'. A conversation with him could begin only when the taste buds were done with soaking the flavours wrapped in the 'beeda'. The sentences often began with 'amaa miyan aap bhi kamaal hain'. The phrase was followed by a qissa (anecdote) that unfolded with several rounds of bone tickling and ended with a social message that compelled introspection.

Consider the satirical piece 'Bank Locker' which begins with 'aapki kasam sahibon, ek hamare pas bhi hai ... bank locker' – a style so Lakhnavi. "Laakar (as locker is written in Hindi) samajhte hain na..." KP asks in his distinct style. "Jis mein laa, laa kar rakha jaye..." he reveals even as the mind races to find a suitable answer. As the 'qissagoyi' (narration) proceeds, KP's pennilessness comes to the fore.

And as always, Mirza is witness to his plight in the typical sentence, "mere dost Mirza mere dard se waqif the.." The high point comes when he launches a humorous attack on corrupt officials stating, "afsaron ke laakar khole gaye to karoro rupyon ka desh prem baramad hua.." It ends with the message that the empty locker of honesty should not be spoiled with offerings of bribery.

"His art of story telling was an embodiment of Lucknow's Ganga-Jamuni tehzib," says Sarvesh Asthana, city- based satirist. "He generously used terms like 'amaa miyan' (hey you), barkhurdar (son), baat ka chalan (due course of conversation), fasad ki jad (root of trouble), tabiyat hui ki (I felt like) any Lucknowite would relate with to weave his stories that wittily attacked cultural decay and social insensitivity," adds Asthana.

Having written more than 17,000 pieces in 50 years, KP introduced and established Lakhnavi lingo and way of life to the world of Hindi literature. A time came when his talent and style became the fourth pillar of Indian satire and humour as he joined the league of stalwarts like Harishankar Parsai, Sharad Joshi and Srilal Shukla. "His demise has closed the chapter of Lakhnavi style humour and satire," said Asthana.

A distinct KP satire always revolved around Mirza, Panditji or Bibi, the characters through whom he targeted the 'evil' around him. The piece was incomplete without the mention of paan ki gilauri and murgha (chicken). On many occasions, the 'paan ki gilauri' (laao zara ek gilauri to khilao, phir socha jaye) was medicinal for the thought process while murgha was the instrument to damn mindless actions ('murghe ki tarah baang de rahe ho', or 'murghe ki tarah ek taang pe kyo khade ho').

"The beauty of KP's style lies in its simplicity but the attack on the 'wrong' haunting his mind was always the punch," says Ashok Chakradhar, poet and satirist. For instance, he damned India's consistent poor show during the Olympics by stating, "Olympic woh ghaat hai jahan hamare khiladi apna sar mundwate hain aur naak katwate hain magar doob ke mar nahin paate kyunki unke andar haad maas ki jagah shayad hawa bhari hui hai."

To acknowledge his immense contribution to Hindi literature, K.P.Saxena Vyangyakar Samman is awarded every year on his birth anniversary. For 2017, Suryakumar Pandey was awarded the K.P.Saxena Varishth Vyangyakar Samman.

=== Death ===
He succumbed to a cardiac arrest on 31 October 2013 in Lucknow.

== Filmography ==
Year	Film
2001	Lagaan
2004	Swades
2004	Hulchul
2008	Jodhaa Akbar
