= Sanskar Bharti =

Indian cultural organization

Sanskar Bharati is an organization that works to promote Indian art, fine arts, and culture. Notable contributors include Indian intellectuals like Bhaurao Devars, Haribhau Wakankar, Nanaji Deshmukh, Madhavrao Devale, and Yogendra.

== History ==
The concept of Sanskar Bharati was first developed in 1954, and the first institute was established in Lucknow in 1981; it has been operating in Lucknow for over 30 years.

In 1988, the Mirzapur unity was formed for the Ekadashi (Rangbhari Ekadashi) of the Falgun Shukla Party.

== Presence and motto ==
At present, there are over 1200 branches of Sanskar Bharati throughout the country of India. Its motto is "Art gives freedom by cutting the straits of evil".

Sanskar Bharati works in various spheres of the society with the aim of awakening patriotism, cultivating appreciation of "Indian values," and encouraging the development of various arts and novice artists.

Since 1990, the annual session of Sanskar Bharati has been organized in the form of an 'Art Sekhak Sangam', in which various forms of arts like music, plays, painting, poetry, literature, and dance are displayed. Various established and novice artists from across the country participate in this event.

Sanskar Bhakti is affiliated with the Rashtriya Swayamsewak Sangh (RSS) and has been called its "cultural wing".

== Working committee ==
The present organizational structure of Sanskar Bharati is as follows:

S. No	Name	Position
1	Baba Yogendra	National Guardian, Agra
2	Vasudev Kamath	National President, Mumbai
3	Vishram Jamdar	National Mahamantri, Nagpur
4	Ravindra Bharti	National Minister of State, Jaipur
5	Anand Prakash Narayan Singh	Provincial Speaker (Bihar), Patna
6	Vinod Kumar Gupta	Provincial Mahamantri (Bihar), Patna
7	Dr. S. Pratam Singh	Provincial President (Kashi Province)
8	Dr. S. Ganesh Awasthi	Provincial Executive President (Kashi Province)
9	Shri Sujit Srivastava	Provincial General Secretary (Kashi Province)
10	Major Deendayal	Patshak
11	Dao Ajay Sharma	President
12	Nirmal Popli	Vice President
13	Suresh Vashishtha	Vice President
14	Shri Sampoor Singh	Mahamantri
15	Shri Abhishek Gupta	Maha Pratham
16	Shri Rakesh Kumar	Treasurer
17	Shri Uditendu Verma 'Nishchal'	Minister
18	Shrimati Swadesh Charaura	Maternal Power Chief
19	D.R. Raicha Gupta	Organization Minister
