= Vyangya =

Vyangya means satire in Hindi literature. Vyangya writings include the essence of sarcasm and humour in Hindi literature. Some of the better known writers in this genre are Harishankar Parsai, Sri Lal Sukla, K. P. Saxena, Mahesh Garg Bedhadak, Ashok Chakradhar, Gyan Chaturvedi, Suryakumar Pandey, Sharad Joshi, etc.
