= City Books =

Bookstore in Pittsburgh, Pennsylvania, US

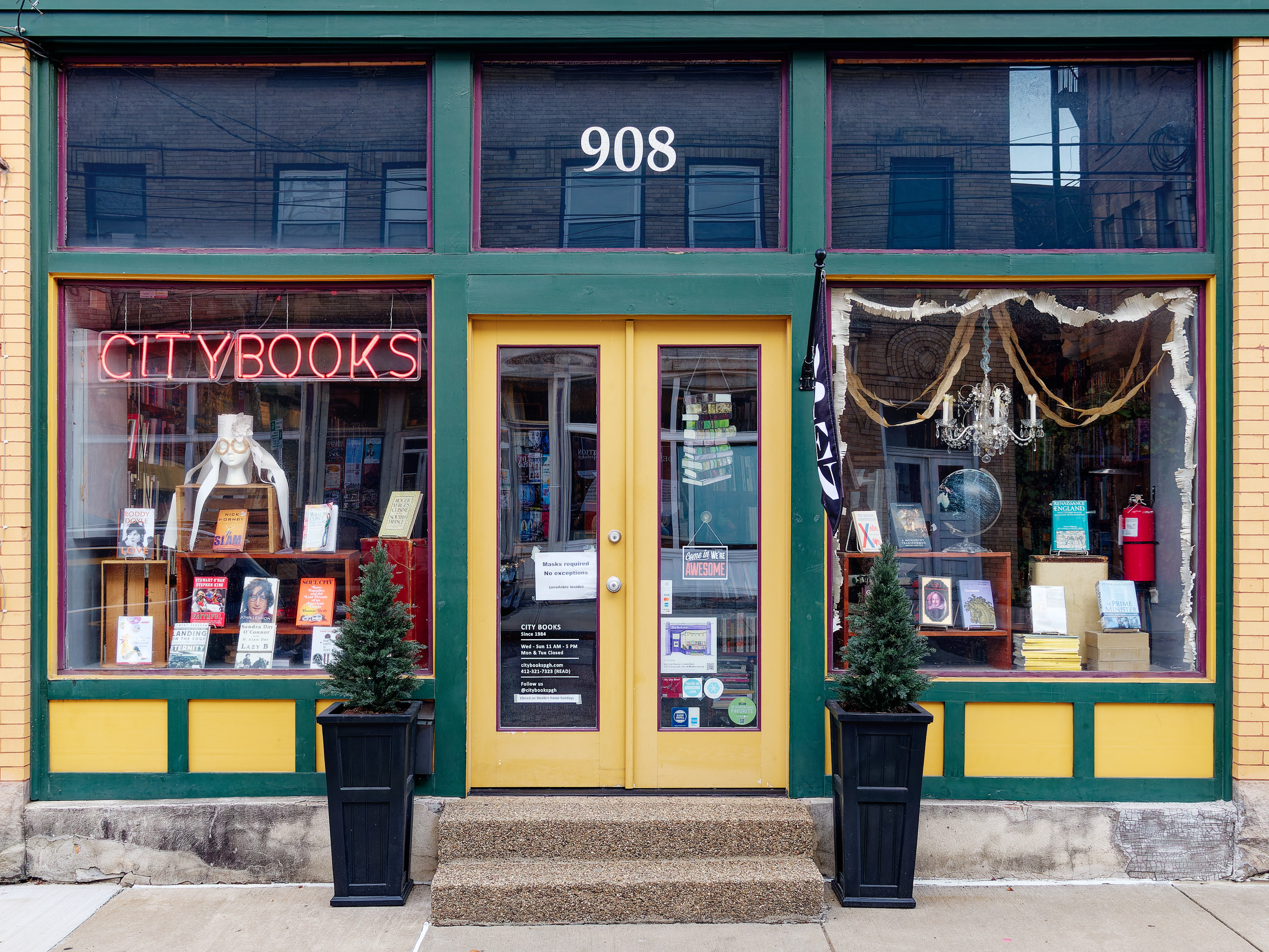
- City Books Entrance
- Formerly: City Books & Antiques
- Industry: Bookstore
- Founded: 1984; 41 years ago
- Founders: Edward Gelblum & Frank Carroll
- Headquarters: 908 Galveston Ave, Pittsburgh, United States
- Owner: Arlan Hess (2015–present)
- Website: citybookspgh.com

City Books is the oldest independent bookstore in Pittsburgh, Pennsylvania. Founded in 1984, it specializes in rare books with an emphasis on contemporary fiction and poetry. Mental Floss calls City Books one of the “Best Bookstores in All 50 States.”

During the COVID-19 pandemic, the bookstore went viral on social media for unboxing rare and first edition books.

== History ==
=== Early beginnings ===
Founded in 1984 by Duquesne University philosophy professor Edward Gelblum and Frank Carroll as City Books & Antiques, City Books was re-branded solely as a bookstore in 1987. Located on Pittsburgh's South Side, the shop began as one floor, later expanding to two floors in the 1990s with the addition of a coffee bar on the second floor.

Renowned for its distinctive spiral steel staircase, the original City Books location held over 20,000 general interest titles at its peak with an emphasis on Judaism, philosophy, and psychology. The bookstore held author events, workshops, and readings for thirty years before the Carson Street location closed for business on December 31, 2014.

=== North Side Relocation ===
Arlan Hess, a former professor at Washington & Jefferson College, purchased City Books in 2015. Hess relocated City Books to Pittsburgh's Allegheny West neighborhood in 2016 where it became the North Side's first independent bookstore.

The new location retained the original bookshelves, artwork, neon sign, and core inventory. Inside the bookstore is a desk for a writer-in-residence and micro-gallery in the rear. The current City Books is 600 sq. ft. and holds approximately 5,000 used & collectible books and vintage magazines with an emphasis on contemporary fiction and poetry.

== Writers-in-Residence ==
In February 2020, City Books launched a Writer-in-Residence program for emerging adult writers. At first a "virtual" residency throughout COVID-19 pandemic quarantine. Today, residents are given a desk inside the bookstore.

Previous writers-in-residence include Kim Rooney, Alona Williams, Marsha Timblin, Khalil Malik, and Pravin Wilkins.

== Activism and awards ==
After the Pittsburgh synagogue shooting in November 2018, City Books held a memorial reading with local writers raising money for HIAS. In 2021, Book Riot featured City Books as part of their cross country US Road Trip in 2021.
