= Khushbir Singh Shaad =

Khushbir Singh 'Shaad'
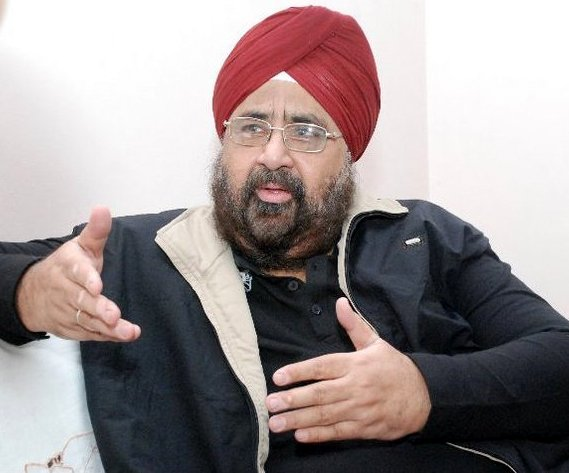
- Khushbir Singh Shaad
- Born: Khushbir Singh Hora; District Sitapur, Uttar Pradesh, India
- Occupations: Urdu Poet, writer
- Spouse: Kanwaljit Kaur
- Awards: Yash Bharti Award (2014)

Khushbir Singh Shaad (Urdu: خوشبیر سنگھ شاد) (Hindi:खुशबीर सिंह 'शाद') is an Indian Urdu Shayar (poet) with over 15 books of Urdu Ghazals to his credit published in Devnagri, Urdu and Punjabi languages. Born on 04 Sep 1954 (Sitapur) Uttar Pradesh, to Late Sri. Rawail Singh Hora & Smt Joginder Kaur Hora. He is an alumnus of Christ Church College, City Montessori School & KKV Lucknow.

== Poetry ==
Acting upon suggestion of his 'Ustaad' Wali Aasi, he learned Urdu script around the time his first book (Jaane Kab Yeh Mausam Badle) was released. Shaad has also penned verses for the title song of Bollywood film - Dhokha made by film maker Mahesh Bhatt. He has been participating in many Mushaira(s) of note such as Jashn-e-Bahar Delhi, Indo-Pak Friendship Mushaira, Dallas International Mushaira, 7th International Urdu Conference (Karachi, Pakistan), International Urdu Mushaira (Abu Dhabi)

== Books ==
- Jaane Kab Yeh Mausam Badle (1992)
- Geeli Mitti (1998)
- Chalo Kuch Rang Hi Bikhrey (2000)
- Zara Yeh Dhoop Dhal Jaye (2005)
- Bekhawabiyan (2007)
- Jahan Tak Zindagi Hai (2009)
- Bikharne Se Zara Pehle (2011)
- Lahoo Ki Dhoop (2012)
- Baat Andar ke Mausam Ki (2014)
- Shehar Ke Shor se Juda (2017)
- Halat Kuch Alag Si (2018)
- Hawa Patte Udati Ja Rahi Hai (2019)
- Ek Hi Chehra tha Ghar MeiN (2019)
- Khushbir Singh Shaad Diyan Chonvian Gazlan (2019) - collection of Ghazal selected by Kuknus Publishers in Punjabi transcript
- Aabyari Dard Ki (2019)

== Awards ==
Yash Bharti Award (2014)

Jash E Adab Aijaz Award (2015)

Lala Jagat Narayan Sammaan Punjab (2017)
