= Krishn Kanhai =

Indian painter (born 1961)

- Born: 21 August 1961 (age 64); Vrindavan, Mathura, Uttar Pradesh, India
- Other name: Krishna Chitrakar
- Occupations: Artist, painter
- Children: 3
- Parent(s): Padmashri Kanhai Chitrakar & Geeta (Mother)
- Awards: Padma Shri; Rashtriya Kalidas Samman; Yash Bharti by U.P. Govt; Brij Ratna; Achiever of the Millennium Award
- Website: krishnkanhai.com

Krishn Kanhai (born 21 August 1961) is an Indian artist and painter, specialist in portrait, realistic, contemporary paintings and on lord Radha-Krishna theme paintings. A Padmshri awardee, Kanhai is described as an artist with the midas touch.

== Introduction ==
Krishn Kanhai is a masterful contemporary, portrait, as well as traditional gold painting. He has, however, not confined himself to the traditional art alone, but has also introduced certain techniques of his own that makes the canvas aesthetically appealing. He started painting folk themes while still in his teens during the mid 1970s and gradually came to evolve a style of his own. He gained popularity soon and became a pioneer of the Yamuna Ghat painting school. He has painted numerous portraits of Radha-Krishna and their tales. He is a fusion artist and often uses enchanting Radha-Krishna postures and turns them into contemporary, eye-catching modern art. He often uses pure gold and precious gems as raw material for his paintings.

Following in the footsteps of his father and mentor Padmashri Kanhai Chitrakar who himself was a renowned Krishna and Radha artist, young Krishna was encouraged by his father to carve his own niche, which he did earlier than expected. It is seldom, if ever that a father and a son have been honoured with a national award like Padmashri.

== Career ==
Over the course of his career Krishn Kanhai made more than 5000 paintings, approximately 800 portraits, approximately 700 contemporary paintings and more than 3500 gold paintings. Kanhai is an India artist known for his paintings of several former presidents and prime ministers of India. The list includes names like former Prime Minister of India Atal Bihari Vajpayee and former Deputy Prime Minister Lal Krishna Advani, besides the eminent industrialist Aditya Birla and his wife Rajshri Birla together with, one of her own kind politician, film actor and dream girl Hema Malini. For his outstanding and original contribution to the art of portraits, painting, the Government honoured him with Padmashri in 2004. He is also recipient of the National Kalidas Award 2009-10 from the Government of Madhya Pradesh as well as Yash Bharti Award from Uttar Pradesh Government (2015), and many more.

Krishn Kanhai got his art work unveiled by Prime Minister Narendra Modi. The life-size portrait of Sardar Vallabhbhai Patel was placed in the Statue of Unity at the behest of Prime Minister Modi.

A life size portrait of Bharat Ratna awardee and former Prime Minister of India, Shri Atal Bihari Vajpayee, hangs in the Central Hall of the Parliament at New Delhi, which was inaugurated in February 2019 by President of India, Shri Ramnath Kovind in the presence of our Prime Minister Shri Narendra Modi and several others.

On a request from the Uttar Pradesh Government Krishn Kanhai painted 59 portraits of UP leaders, 22 Chief Ministers of UP- past and present along with 20 past and present Speakers of the UP Assembly besides three portraits of Mahatma Gandhi, One portrait of Dr. Rajendra Prasad, one portrait of Dr. Bhim Rao Ambedkar & 12 portraits of Sabhapati of Vidhan Parishad.

He has also painted former President Bill & Hillary Clinton, former President Barack Obama and his family and Lord Jo Johnson (Member of House of Lords of United Kingdom), brother of former Prime Minister Mr. Boris Johnson.

ACHIEVEMENT Two research scholars, one Sangeeta Gupta of Bhimrao Ambedkar University Agra and the other Mohammad Wasim of Jiwaji Rao University, Gwalior were awarded Ph.D's on Kanhai (Father) and Krishn (Son), respectively.

== Awards ==
- International Acclaim by Mr. A.H. Nelly (U.S.) President of International Publishers for Gold Paintings of Krishna Chitrakar on 30th Jan 1992.
- Received “Achiever of the millennium award 1999” at New Delhi.
- Brij Ratna” by Hon’ble Shri Mohammad Hamid Ansari, Then Vice Chancellor of Alighar University.
- Varisht Nagrik Samman” by Distt. Magistrate Mathura.
- Hon’ble Shri A.P.J Abdul Kalam President of India president “Padmashri” on 30 June 2004 at President house New Delhi.
- Awarded “Raja Chakradhar Samman” by the Hon’ble Shri Raman Singh, Chief Minister C.G, in September 2009.
- Awarded “Rashtriya Kalidas Samman” by the Govt. of M.P. for the year 2009–10.
- Received “Paridhi Achievers Award” January 2011.
- Awarded Yash Bharti Samman by the Uttar Pradesh Government (2015)
- Received “Special Honor” by Smt. Hema Malani, MP 2016.
- Received “Braj Ratna Samman” by Culture Minister Shri Laxmi Narayan Chaudhary 2017.
- Received “Braj Bhushan Samman” By Hon’ble Defiance Minister Shri Rajnath Singh 2019.
- Received “Braj Vibhuti Samman” by Padmashri Ashok Chakradhar -2019.
- Received "Dr. A.P.J Adul Kalam Samman", May 2022
- Received "Atal Bihari Vajpayee National Award", Oct 2023
- Received "Golden Achiever Award", Dec 2023

== Exhibitions ==
- Hotel President June, 1981, Mumbai
- Seth studio, June, 1981, Mumbai
- Birla Academy of Art & Culture July 1981, Kolkata
- Haryana Bhawan July, 1981 Kolkata
- Special Show, Prime Minister House, 30 January 1999, New Delhi
- India Habitat Centre, February 1999, New Delhi
- Lalit Kala Academy, November 1993 New Delhi
- Special Show, Prime Minister House, November, 1993, New Delhi
- Birla academy of Art & Culture, September 2000 Kolkata
- Nehru Centre, Mumbai, September 2004
- Nehru Centre, Mumbai, November 2007
- Special Show, Chief Minister House, Raipur (Chhattisgarh) September 2009
- Raja Chakradhar samaroh, Raigarh (Chhattisgarh) September 2009
- Ravimdra Bhawan, Bhopal, M.P March 2012
- New Delhi Natya Tarangini, Saket, April 2022
- Mumbai:- November 2022, Exhibition at Tao Art Gallery, Worli, Inaugurated by Mrs. Shilpa Shetty, famous Flim Actress.

== International exhibitions ==
- Houston, Texas, U.S., August 2000
- Hotel Holiday inn, Hong Kong, February 2002
- Hindu Temple, Manila (Philippines), February 2002
- Hotel Park Plaza, Westminster, London April 2015
- Dubai (UAE) : May 2024, Exhibition at Hotel Taj Business bay, Dubai, Inaugurated by

 Mr. Satish Kumar Sivan (Consul General of India to Dubai )

Kanhai Art and master of traditional method of painting using gold leaves and gem stones. He was born in Vrindavan, in Mathura district in the Indian state of Uttar Pradesh. Learning the art from his father, Padmashri Shri Kanhai Chitrakar,

Krishn carry on the tradition from Kanhai Art Works, their base at Vrindavan. He is a recipient of the Achiever of the Millennium in 1999.

The Government of India honoured him in 2004, with the award of Padma Shri. Also he was honoured with Rashriya Kalidas Award for 2009-10 and Govt of U.P. also honoured him YASH BHARTI in 2015.

In August 2016, Kanhai made 40 portrait paintings for U.P. Vidhan Sabha, 20 portraits of all Ex Chief Minister's, 18 portraits of Vidhan Sabha Speakers and one Portrait of Mahatma Gandhi.
