= Bal kavita =

Children's poems and rhymes in Hindi

Bal kavita are poems written for children in Hindi.

== See also ==
- Hindi literature
