= Uttar Pradesh Hindi Sansthan =

- Type: Literary
- Purpose: Literary and Cultural
- Headquarters: Lucknow, Uttar Pradesh, India
- Location: Lucknow, Uttar Pradesh, India
- Official language: Hindi
- Key people: Yogi Adityanath (president)
- Main organ: Academy, Library, Auditorium, Publications
- Affiliations: Government of Uttar Pradesh

Uttar Pradesh Hindi Sansthan also known as UP Hindi Sansthan is an autonomous organisation in Uttar Pradesh, working for the promotion of Hindi language. It is run under the Department of Languages, Government of Uttar Pradesh.

Apart from organizing various programs, it also honors to litterateurs for their contribution in various fields for the promotion of Hindi. The Chief Minister of Uttar Pradesh, Yogi Adityanath serving as the president of UP Hindi Sansthan. He appoints the executive chairman and director. Sadanand Prasad Gupt was appointed as the acting chairman of the Uttar Pradesh Hindi Sansthan in September 2017.

== See also ==
- Central Institute of Hindi
- World Hindi Secretariat
