= Yāmā (poetry collection) =

1939 Hindi poetry collection by Mahadevi Varma

- First edition
- Author: Mahadevi Varma
- Original title: यामा
- Illustrator: Mahadevi Varma
- Language: Hindi
- Genre: Poem
- Publisher: Kitabistan and Bharati Bhandar (former); Lokbharti Prakashan (current)
- Publication date: 1939; 87 years ago
- Publication place: British India
- Media type: Print (Hardcover and Paperback)
- Pages: 236
- Awards: Jñānapīṭh Award
- ISBN: 8180313069 (2008 edition)

Yama (Hindi: यामा, romanized: Yāmā) is a Hindi poetry collection composed by Mahadevi Varma. It compiles poems from her four earlier collections and was first published in 1939. The collection also contains several paintings, and line arts created by the poet herself.

Influenced by devotional and mystical traditions, the collection is characterized by introspective depth, emotional nuance, and a contemplative, philosophical style. For this work, Varma was presented with India's highest literary honor—the Jñānapīṭh Award for 1982—at a ceremony held in 1983. Selected poems from the collection have been set to classical and contemporary music and translated into English and several Indian languages.

== Content ==
The title Yāmā is derived from the feminine plural of yām, a term referring to the four divisions of either the daytime or the night. The choice of title is symbolic, reflecting the poetic phases across the poet's four previous works — Nīhār (Mist, 1930), Raśmi (A Ray of Light, 1932), Nīrajā (Blossomed Lotus, 1933), and Sāndhyagīt (Twilight Song, 1936). In the preface to the book, the poet states:

Yāmā contains the shadow play of the four phases (yām) of my inner world. Whether these belong to the daytime or the night—this is not impossible for me to determine, but it is certainly difficult. If they are of the day, they did not tire my heart with toil to the point of yearning for rest; and if they are of the night, they did not allow me to lose my faith in the darkness. Therefore, to me, their value is equal—and shall always remain so.
(English translation) (Note: यामा में मेरे अन्तर्जगत् के चार यामों का छायाचित्र है। ये याम दिन के हैं या रात के यह कहना मेरे लिए असम्भव नहीं तो कठिन अवश्य है। यदि ये दिन के हैं तो इन्होंने मेरे हृदय को श्रम से क्लान्त बना कर विश्राम के लिए आकुल नहीं बनाया और यदि रात के हैं तो इन्होंने अन्धकार में मेरे विश्वास को खोने नहीं दिया अतएव मेरे निकट इनका मूल्य समान है और समान ही रहेगा।)

The collection comprises 185 lyric poems in total, drawing 47 from Nīhār, 35 from Raśmi, 58 from Nīrajā, and 45 from Sāndhyagīt. Some early editions of Yāmā also included tipped-in pages featuring illustrations created by the poet herself, reflecting the stylistic influence of the Bengal School of Art. Additionally, the imprints by Kitabistan featured an introductory poem that combined a wash-style painting with Varma's handwritten text; this poem was omitted in later editions and other compilations of her work. The current edition by Lokbharti Prakashan contains only a reduced selection of 63 poems from the complete volume and excludes all artwork.

== Themes ==
The collection reflects the central themes of Chhayavad, the literary movement to which Varma is attributed to. It explores motifs such as separation, yearning, existential melancholy, divine beloved, bond with nature, and the pursuit of spiritual transcendence.

The collection traces the evolving stages of the poet's emotional journey and poetic expression, moving from a state of wonder, confusion, and turmoil to one of contemplation, reflection, and ultimately, a serene acceptance of pleasure and sorrow.

== Analysis ==
Devanagari
प्रिय मैं सीमा की गोदपली,
पर हूँ असीम से खेली भी!

Transliteration
Priya main sīmā kī godpalī,
par hū̃ asīm se kheli bhī!

Translation
Dear one, I was cradled in the lap of limitation,
But I have also played with the limitless.

— from Nīrajā

Literary critic, Acharya Ramchandra Shukla, noted that the sorrow of separation from an unseen beloved evokes a rich spectrum of emotions. He admired the lyrical brilliance of the poetry, highlighting Varma's unmatched ability to craft songs that combined refined language, profound emotional resonance, and a distinctive expressive power. While acknowledging her poetic achievements, Shukla also reflected on whether the deeply personal and seemingly otherworldly emotions in her work arose from lived experience or were the product of poetic imagination.

Nand Dulare Bajpai observes that Varma's poetry draws significantly from the devotional and mystical traditions, particularly the saguṇa-sākāra mode—worship of the absolute with form. He characterizes her style as introspective and emotionally refined. Her poetic strength lies in her ability to express spiritual sorrow subtly, though he also notes that her use of abstract imagery can, at times, lead to obscurity. Drawing comparisons to poets such as Meera and Tagore, Bajpai highlights Varma's restraint, philosophical tone, and meditative quality as distinctive features of her work.

David Rubin, an American author and translator, observed Varma as the most elusive among the Chhayavadi poets (Note: The other prominent poets of Chhayavad are Jaishankar Prasad, Suryakant Tripathi Nirala and Sumitranandan Pant.) and also the most challenging to translate, since the meaning in her work is inseparably bound to its subtle and allusive musicality. In her poetry, music itself becomes a vehicle of meaning, distinguishing her use of themes and images from that of the early Bhakti poets. Her writings, therefore, require from readers not only considerable patience but also an almost ecstatic immersion.

== Reception ==
Varma receiving the Jñānapīṭh Award

The Bhāratīya Jñānapīṭh on the occasion of Guru Purnima observed on July 24, 1983, announced Mahadevi Varma as the recipient of the 18th (1982) Jñānapīṭh Award. (Note: The Jñānapīṭh Award is attributed to a particular year, but it is announced—and often presented—the following year.) Shortly after the announcement, in an interview broadcast on Akashvani (AIR) with Agyeya, she expressed:

That which is offered belongs to Sarasvati and is dedicated only at her feet. To consider it one's own, or to attribute it to a person, is a kind of mistake. We can only be intermediaries. This is an offering at the feet of Sarasvati, and it is also the offering of those who have appreciated the work.
(English translation) (Note: जो अर्पित किया जाता है वह तो सरस्वती का है और सरस्वती के चरणों में ही निवेदित है। उसे अपना समझ लेना, व्यक्ति का समझ लेना एक तरह की भूल होती है। हम केवल मध्यस्थ हो सकते हैं। सरस्वती के चरणों में यह निवेदन है और जिन्हें कृति अच्छी लगी होगी उनका भी निवेदन है।)

That year, the criterion for awarding moved away from honoring a single work. Although Yāmā is a single volume, it was recognized more as a representative collection reflecting Mahadevi Varma's literary contribution than as one standalone creation. (Note: Statement from the official website "The rule has been slightly revised since the 18th Award. The entire contributions of an author for Indian Literature are taken into account for the award.")

The award was presented on November 28, 1983, by the then British Prime Minister, Margaret Thatcher, who recited translated excerpts from Varma's poem Us Pār during the ceremony. The ceremony was also attended by P. V. Narasimha Rao, who was serving as India's Minister of External Affairs at the time and was also the Chairman of the Jñānapīṭh Selection Board. Varma donated the entire prize money of ₹1,50,000 to a fund she had established for the welfare of indigent writers and their families.

== Legacy ==
Several poems from Yāmā have been musically interpreted in both light and classical forms. In the 1970s, a selection of some poems was set to music by Jaidev and rendered by Asha Bhosle. The television channel DD Sahyadri aired a series titled Madhurima, one episode of which was devoted to a musical rendition of Varma's poetry. Dhrupad vocalists Ramakant and Umakant Gundecha have also composed and performed select poems from the collection. Additionally, contemporary poet Kumar Vishwas included songs from Yāmā in his musical album Tarpan, a derivative of his biographical series Mahakavi. An overview of such musical settings is given in the following table.

Section	Poem	Album	Composer(s)	Singer(s)
Nīhār	Jo tum aa jate ek baar	Suranjali, Tarpan	Jaidev, Kumar Vishwas	Asha Bhosle, Ankisha Srivastava
Raśmi	Kaise unko paun aali	Suranjali, Trikon ka chautha kon	Jaidev	Asha Bhosle, Chhaya Ganguly
Nīrajā	Vasant Rajani	Tarpan	Kumar Vishwas	Kumar Vishwas
Nīrajā	Kaun tum mere hriday mein	Madhurima	Ravindra Jain	Hemlata
Nīrajā	Been bhi hoon main	Tarpan	Kumar Vishwas	Ankisha Srivastava
Nīrajā	Madhur madhur mere deepak jal	Suranjali	Jaidev	Asha Bhosle
Nīrajā	Mukhar pik haule bol	Suranjali	Jaidev	Asha Bhosle
Nīrajā	Tum so jao main gaun	Suranjali	Jaidev	Asha Bhosle
Sāndhyagīt	Priya! sandhygagan	Madhurima	Ravindra Jain	Hemlata
Sāndhyagīt	Shoonya mandir	Madhurima	Ravindra Jain	Kavita Krishnamurthy
Sāndhyagīt	Main neer bhari	Dhrupad album, Tarpan	Gundecha Brothers, Kumar Vishwas	Gundecha Brothers, Ankisha Srivastava
Sāndhyagīt	Jaag tujhko door jana	Madhurima	Ravindra Jain	Kumar Sanu

== Translations ==
Selections from Yāmā were translated into English by L. S. Sinha and published in 1987 by Writers Workshop Kolkata. Additional English translations by the American writer David Rubin appeared in two notable anthologies: The Return of Sarasvati: Four Hindi Poets (1998) and Of Love and War: A Chhayavad Anthology (2005), both issued by Oxford University Press.

In addition to English translations, several poems from Yāmā have also been translated into Indian languages. A Bangla translation by Ujjal Singha, titled Mahadevi Racanā-Saṃcayan, was published in 2014 by the Sahitya Akademi. This collection includes selections from Yāmā as well as a few of her prose essays and memoirs. A Telugu compilation, Mahadevi Varma Gītalu, rendered by Chaganti Tulasi, was published in 2015 by Chaso Sphurti Publications. In Odia, a translation by Niharika Mallick, Mahādebī Barmāṅka Nirbācita Kabitā, was released in 2022 by Anubad Sahitya Parisad.

== See also ==
- Symbolism
- Deepshikha
- Hindi literature
- List of Hindi poets
- Ram Ki Shakti Puja
