= Tarpan (TV series) =

- Genre: Poetry
- Created by: KV Studio and ABP News
- Written by: Various
- Directed by: Puneet Sharma, Prabudha Saurabh
- Narrated by: Kumar Vishwas
- Composer: Kumar Vishwas
- Country of origin: India
- Original language: Hindi
- No. of episodes: 101

Production
- Producers: KV Studio and ABP News

Original release
- Release: 15 May 2017

Tarpan is a musical poetry series presented by poet and presenter Kumar Vishwas. It is an appreciation of poets who are now dead, presented through readings of their work by Vishwas against a background of music. The series has its origin in Vishwas dedicating a song to Bharat Bhushan via his poem "Yah Asangati". This came as an afterwork of Mahakavi series that was aired on ABP News which appealed to Hindi audiences.

== Poets included in Tarpan ==
Poets featured include Bharat Bhushan, Bhawani Prasad Mishra, Ramdhari Singh Dinkar, Dushyant Kumar, Suryakant Tripathi Nirala, Harivansh Rai Bachchan, Mahadevi Verma, Baba Nagarjun, Jaishankar Prasad, Subhadra Kumari Chauhan, Maithili Sharan Gupt, Dharamvir Bharati and Sachchidananda Vatsyayan.

The videos of the series are made available on video sharing platform YouTube. The audio of the same are made available on different audio platforms like Saavn and Gaana.

== Copyright issue ==
There was controversy when Vishwas and actor Amitabh Bachchan engaged in a war of words on Twitter. Bachchan alleged that Vishwas had infringed his copyright and said that he would seek legal remedy if the material was not removed from YouTube. Vishwas replied by saying he should have received appreciation for featuring the poem, written by Bachchan's father. The video was taken down and compensation paid.
