= Deepshikha (disambiguation) =

Deepshikha may refer to:

- Deepshikha Deshmukh Indian film producer
- Deepshikha Nagpal Indian actress
- Deepshikha collection of lyric poetry
