= Sahitya Akademi Fellowship =

- Awarded for: Literary award in India
- Sponsored by: Sahitya Akademi
- First award: 1968
- Final award: 2024

Highlights
- Total awarded: 109
- First winner: Sarvepalli Radhakrishnan
- Recent winner(s): • Ajeet Cour • Chandrashekhar Kambar • Pran Kishore Kaul • Ved Rahi
- Website: sahitya-akademi.gov.in/fellowship

The Sahitya Akademi Fellowship is a literary honour in India bestowed by the Sahitya Akademi, India's National Academy of Letters. It is the highest honour conferred by the Akademi on a living writer, the number of fellows at no time exceeding 21. Elected from among writers thought by the Akademi to be of acknowledged merit, the fellows are sometimes described as the "immortals of Indian literature."

Sarvepalli Radhakrishnan was the first writer elected to the Fellowship (in 1968); Mulk Raj Anand was the first Indian English writer to be inducted in 1989 and R. K. Narayan in 1994, the second.

== History and purpose ==
The appointment of Fellows to the Sahitya Akademi was based in part on models of academies of letters, and in particular, on the Académie française's model of honouring literary excellent by electing writers as Members. The initial Constitution of the Academy proposed a limited membership of twenty-one Fellows, who were to be "literary persons of outstanding merit". The first General Committee recommended an expansion in the number of fellows, by including fifty Associate Fellows, as well as five Honorary Fellows. The latter provision was to enable the Akademi to honour foreign writers as well. Despite the inclusion of this provision, the Akademi did not make appointments to the position of Associate Fellows, and in 1999 the provision for their appointment was deleted.

Soon after the death of Jawaharlal Nehru, who was the first President of the Sahitya Akademi, Mulk Raj Anand proposed that Nehru be elected as a Fellow of the Akademi posthumously. This proposal was rejected, and the Akademi took the view that Fellowships would only be conferred upon living writers. The General Council has, as a practice, refrained from electing its own members for the Fellowship, although there have been instances of members of the General Council become fellows after their term on the Council ends. A significant exception to this practice is the appointment of D. Jayakanthan as a Fellow while he was serving on the council.

The first Fellow of the Akademi, S. Radhakrishnan, was elected as Fellow in 1968, fourteen years after the Akademi was constituted. Radhakrishnan had previously served on the Council of the Sahitya Akademi, first as vice-president, and later, as president. He was appointed "in recognition of his outstanding contribution to Indian thought and to the tradition of universal humanism". The first woman to be elected Fellow was Mahadevi Varma, in 1979, followed by three women writers in 1994 (Malayalam poet Balamani Amma, Bengali novelist and poet Ashapoorna Devi, and Urdu novelist Qurratulain Hyder). Hindi author Krishna Sobti was honoured in 1996, and English novelist Anita Desai in 2009. In 2019, the fellowship was conferred on Dogri writer Padma Sachdev and in 2021 to Malayalam writer and critic M. Leelavathy. On 19 September 2021, the Akademi announced the fellowships to Bengali writer Shirshendu Mukhopadhyay, Malayalam writer and critic M. Leelavathy, English writer Ruskin Bond, Hindi writer Vinod Kumar Shukla, Marathi poet and scholar Bhalchandra Nemade, Punjabi writer and professor Tejwant Singh Gill, Sanskrit scholar Rambhadracharya, Tamil playwright Indira Parthasarathy. As of 2023, there are only 17 fellows of the Sahitya Akademi.

== Appointment of fellowships ==
The executive board of the Akademi recommends the names of literary persons to be elected as Fellows and Honorary Fellows to the General Council. The General Council, who operates for the period of five years, holds an authority to elect a fellow based on the recommendation made by the executive board.

The fellowship was established in 1968 and is limited to twenty individuals at any given time. As of 2021, the fellowship has been conferred on 105 writers.

In 1994, the Akademi began the practice of holding an event called 'Samvad' in which Fellows read from their work, and each reading was followed by discussions with a panel of critics and writers. The participants in the first series included Vishnu Bhikaji Kolte (Marathi scholar, writer, and critic), Harbhajan Singh (Punjabi writer and critic) and Nagarjun (Maithili and Hindi poet and novelist).

== Fellowships to foreign authors ==
In addition to twenty-one fellowships to Indian nationals, the Sahitya Akademi has also instituted three fellowships to international writers and scholars.

=== Honorary fellowships ===
The Sahitya Akademi's Constitution provides for the appointment of 'Honorary Fellows' of the Akademi "from among literary persons of outstanding merit who are not nationals of India". The number of such fellowships is limited to ten individuals at any given time, an increase from the original provision for five fellows. The first Honorary Fellow of the Akademi was appointed in 1974: the poet, the first President of Senegal, and theorist of Négritude Léopold Sédar Senghor. The citation provided to him records that "Senghor is one of the leading literary figures of the African continent. As a linguist he has been working to establish links between Dravidian, Sumerian, ancient Egyptian and African languages..." In his acceptance speech, Senghor described himself as an "old admirer of the Indian Civilisation," emphasizing his fondness for the poetry of Indian poet Rabindranath Tagore.

Other Honorary Fellows of the Akademi include American linguist and Indologist Edward C. Dimock; American professor of Sanskrit, Daniel Henry Holmes Ingall; Czech scholar of Dravidian studies, Kamil Vaclav Zvelebil; Chinese professor of Indian literature and translator, Ji Xianlin; Greek diplomant, scholar and poet, Vassilis Vitsaxis; and Russian academic and scholar of Indian history, Evgeni Petrovich Chelyshev.

The most recent recipient of the fellowship is a Mauritian poet, novelist Abhimanyu Unnuth who was awarded in the year 2013. As of 2016, nine individuals have been elected as honorary fellows.

=== Ananda Coomaraswamy Fellowship ===
Named after a Sri Lankan Tamil philosopher Ananda Coomaraswamy, the "Ananda Coomaraswamy Fellowship" was instituted in 1996 and is offered to "a person of eminence in the field of Asian art, culture, literature and language studies" from Asian countries to pursue literary projects. It was announced on three individuals, Sri Lankan Archaeologist Senake Bandaranayake, Japanese author and anthropologist Chie Nakane, and Uzbekistani professor Azad N. Shamatov. (Note: Out of three recipients, only Bandaranayake and Shamatov availed the fellowship and spent several weeks in India doing literary research. Nakane did not avail the fellowship.) The fellowship was discontinued after its first conferral and was revived in 2005 but no conferment has been made since then.

=== Premchand Fellowship ===
The "Premchand Fellowship" is instituted in 2005 and is named after Hindi writer Premchand, who is popularly known as "Munshi Premchand", during his 125th Birth Anniversary. It is given to "a person of eminence in the field of culture and literature" doing research on Indian literature or to creative writers from the South Asian Association for Regional Cooperation (SAARC) countries other than India. The first and sole recipient of the fellowship is a Pakistani national and Urdu writer Intizar Hussain. The period of Fellowship for "Ananda Coomaraswamy Fellowship" and "Premchand Fellowship" ranges from one month to three months depending on the convenience and availability of the recipient. The visiting Fellow needs to submit a comprehensive report of their visit which is to be placed before the executive board and are requested to deliver lectures on the topic of their specialization in universities and institutions dealing in the discipline.

== List of fellows ==
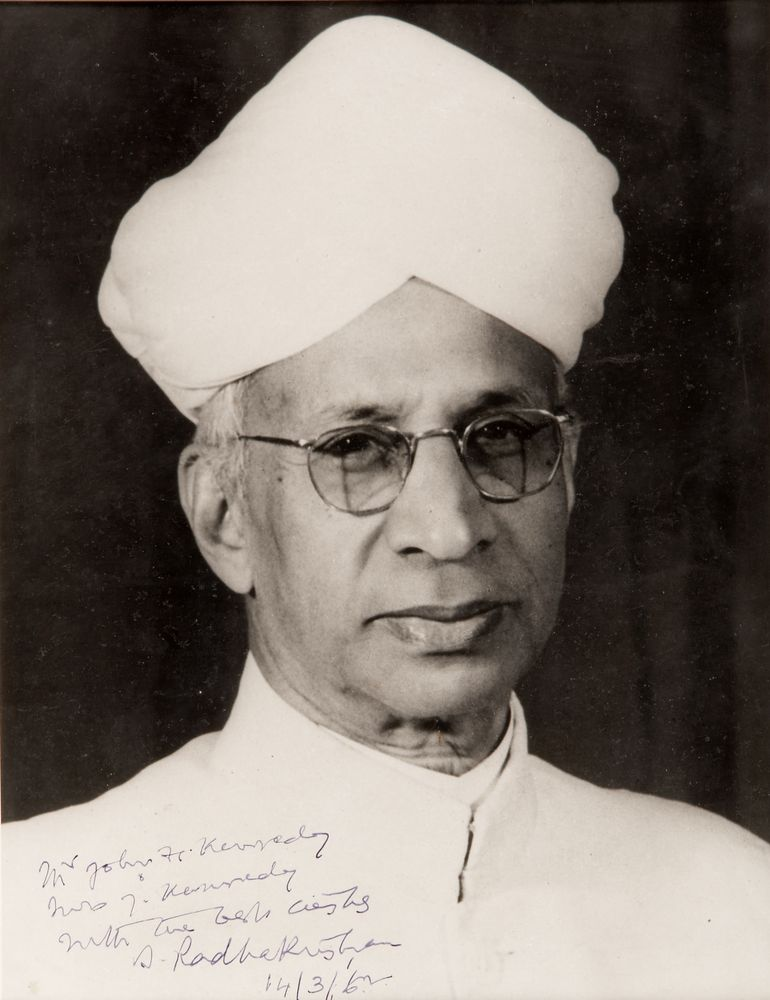
Sarvepalli Radhakrishnan is the first recipient of the Sahitya Akademi Fellowship.

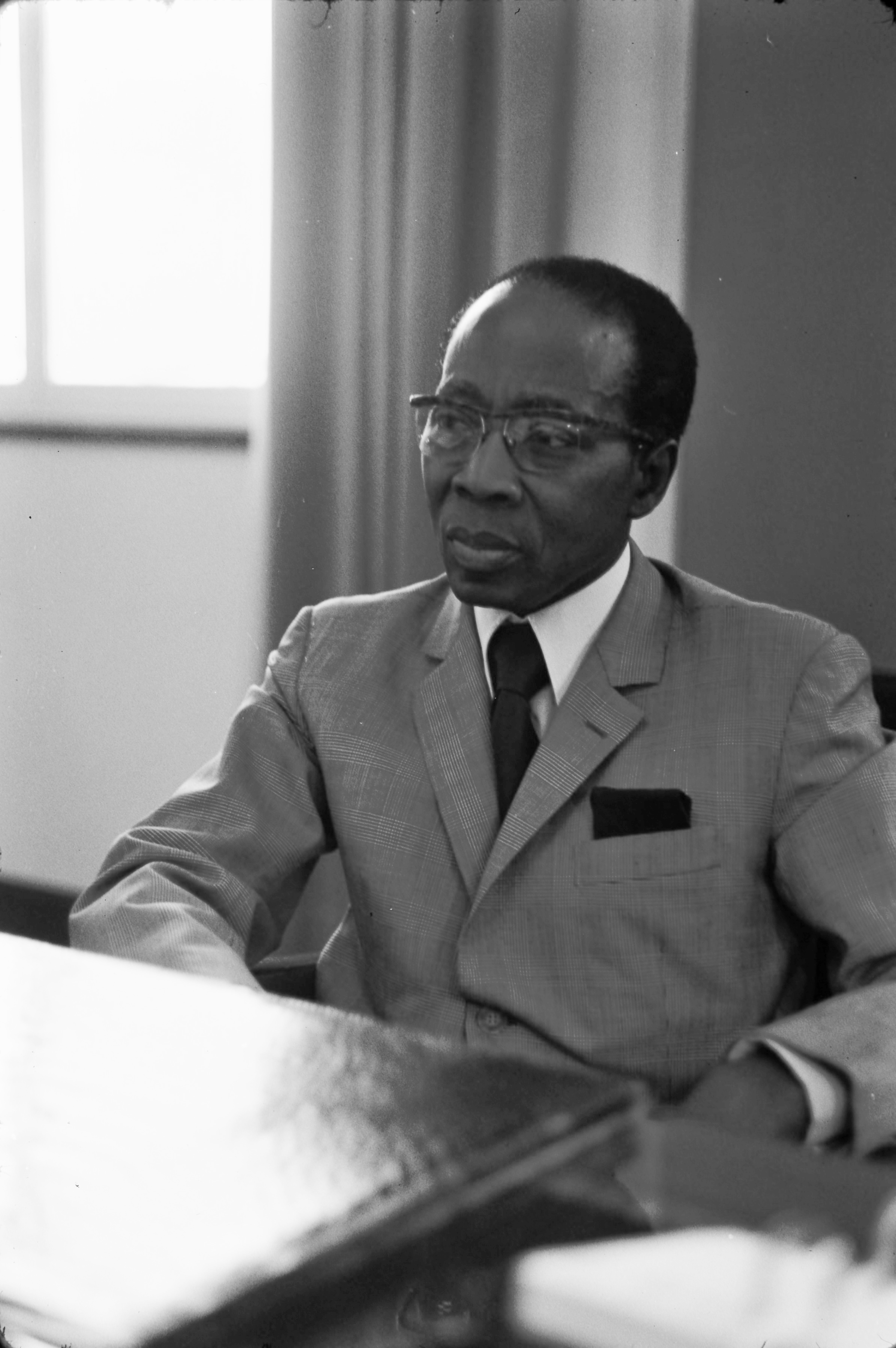
Léopold Sédar Senghor is the first recipient of the Honorary Fellowship.

Current fellows of Sahitya Akademi (from top to bottom)

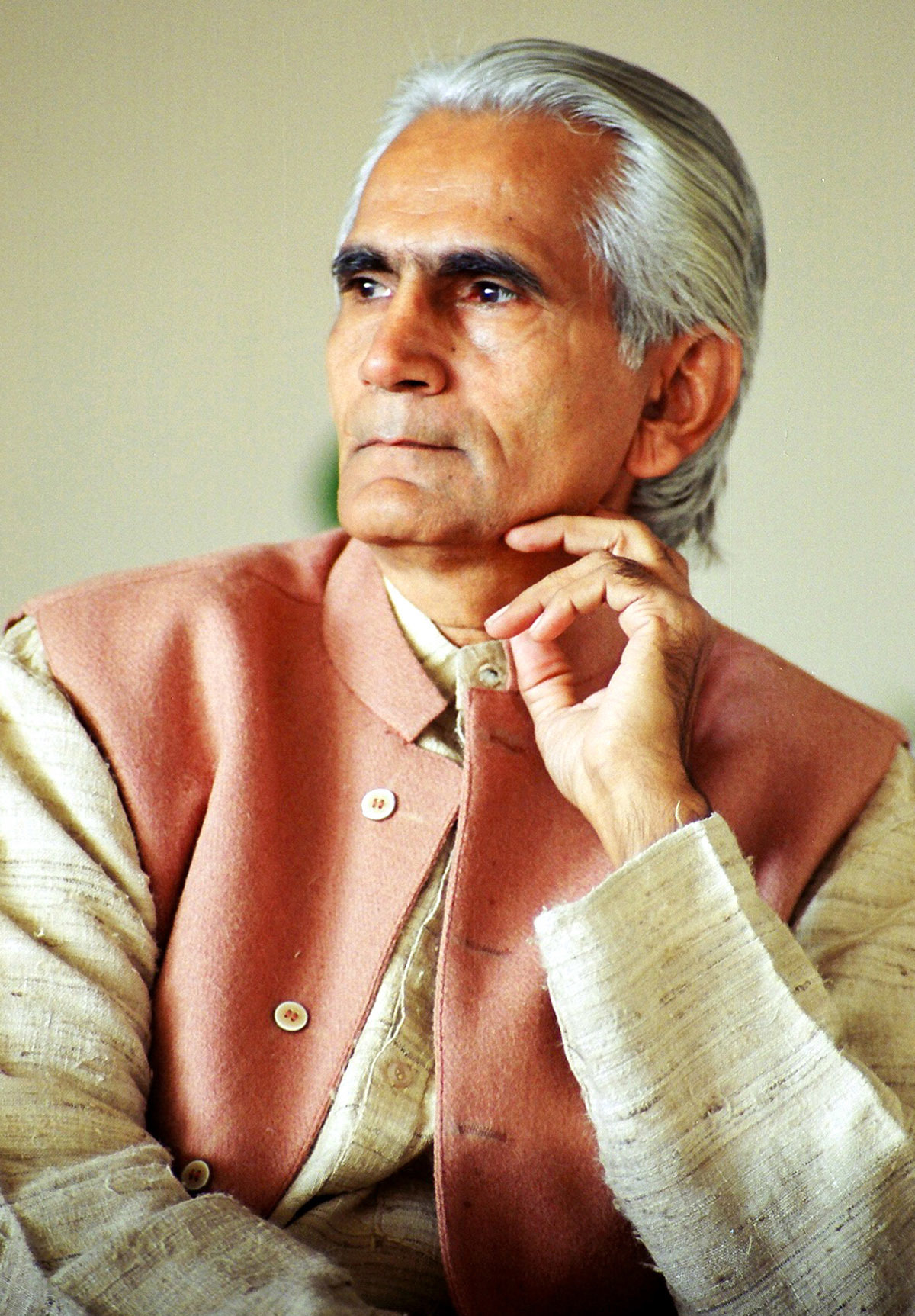
Raghuveer Chaudhari (2013)

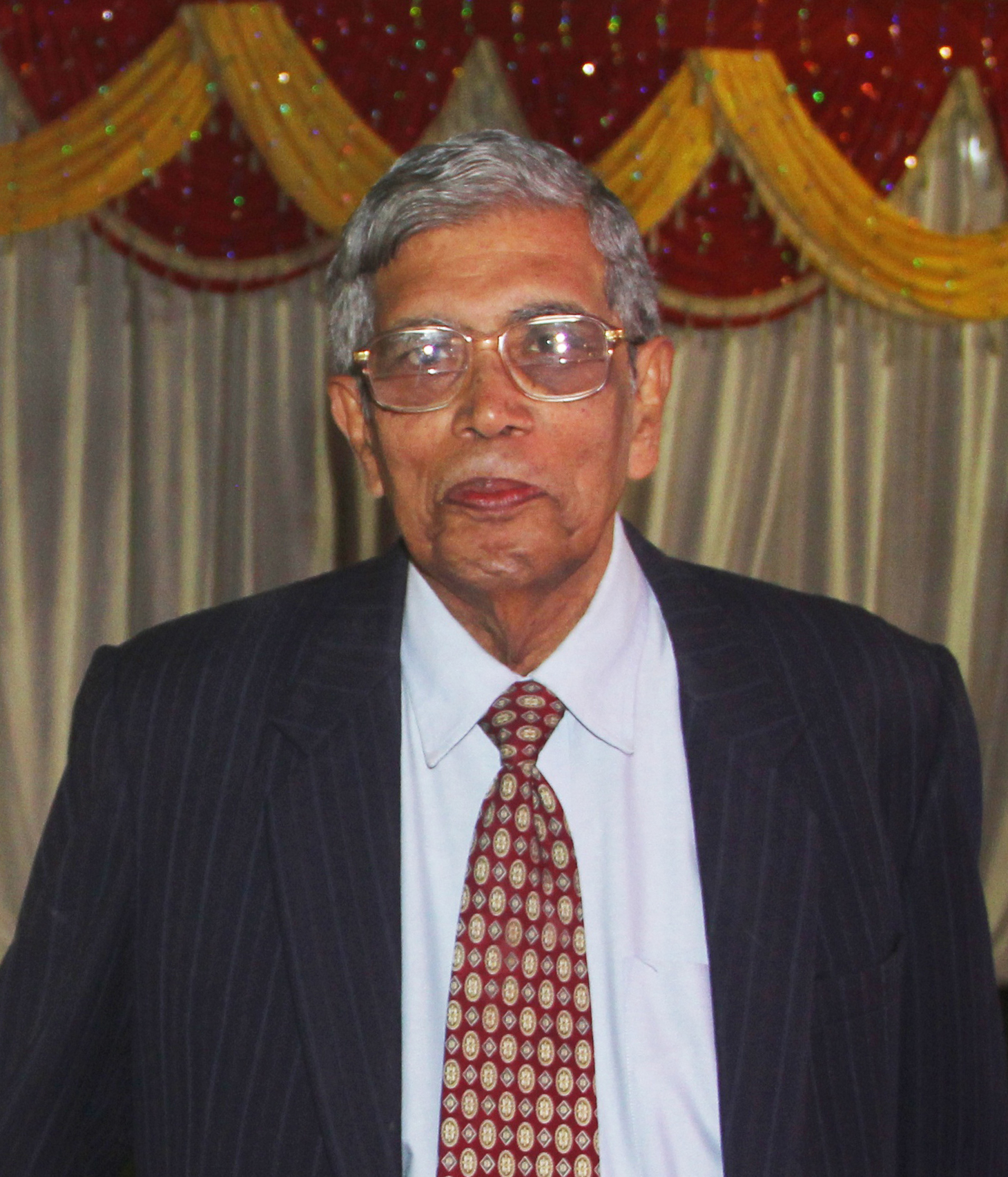
Sitakant Mahapatra (2013)

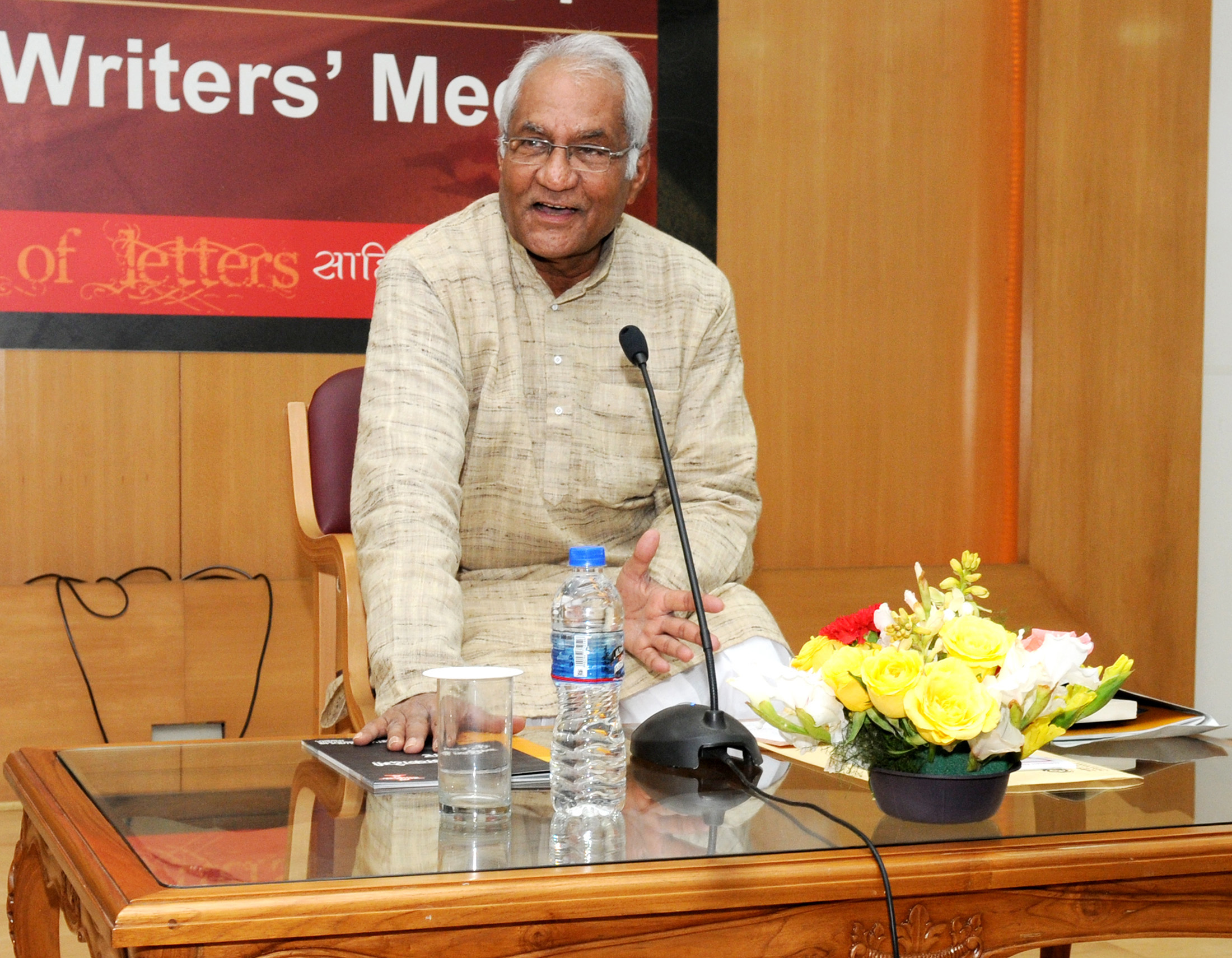
Vishwanath Prasad Tiwari (2019)

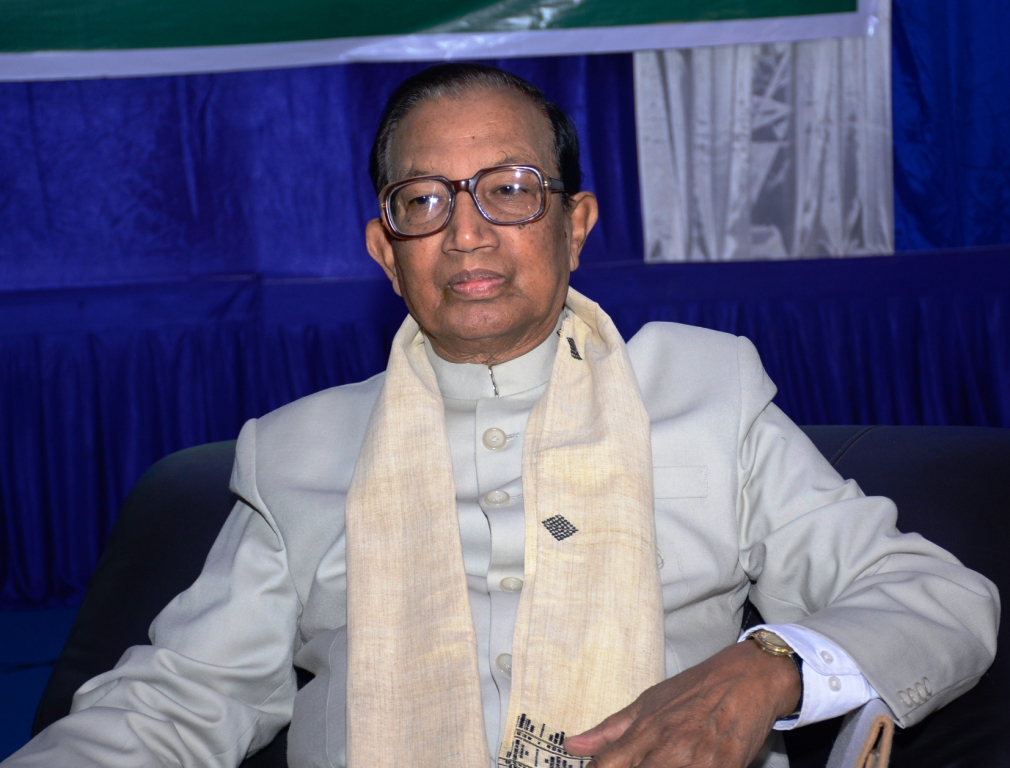
Nagen Saikia (2019)

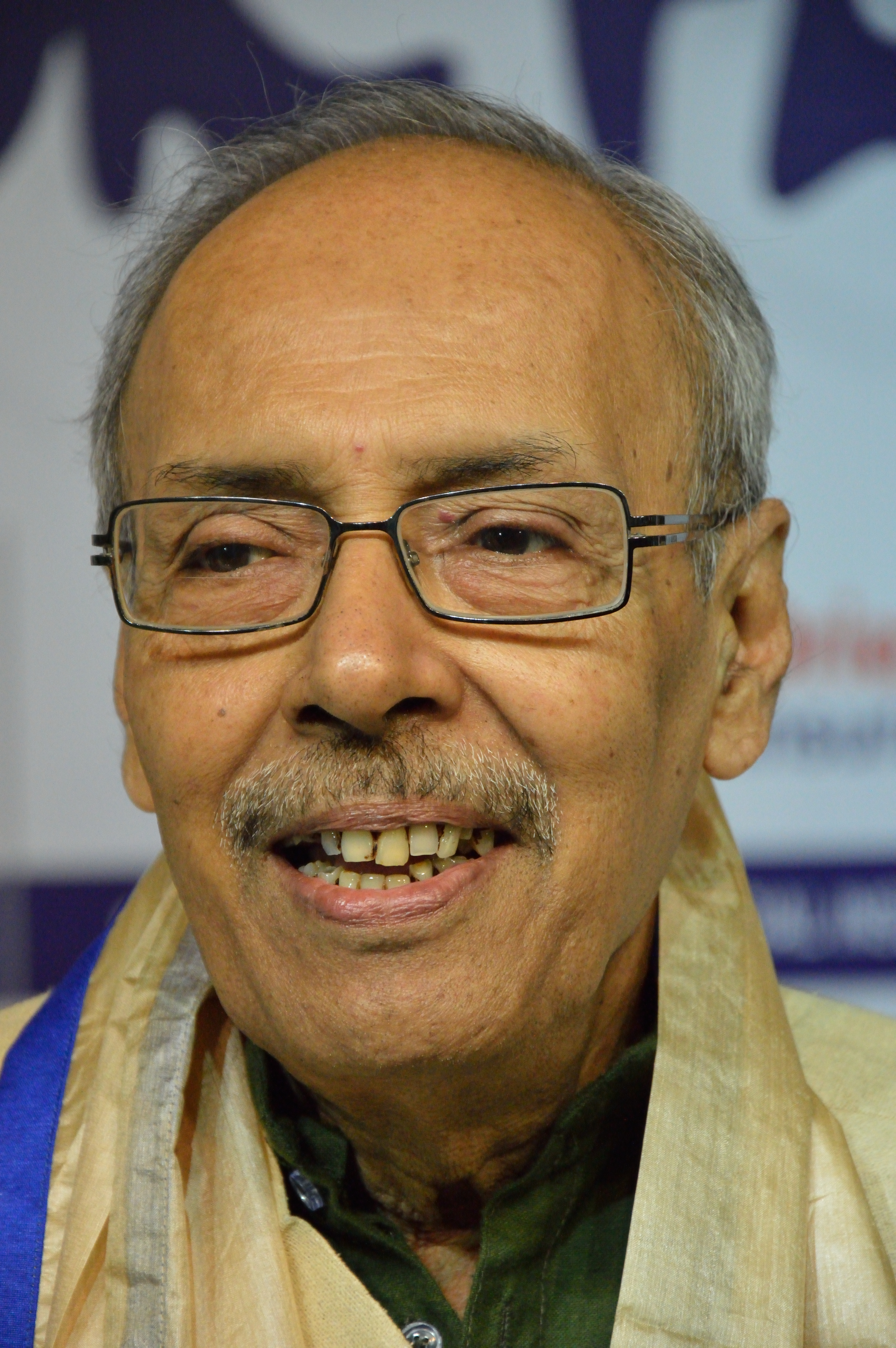
Shirshendu Mukhopadhyay (2021)

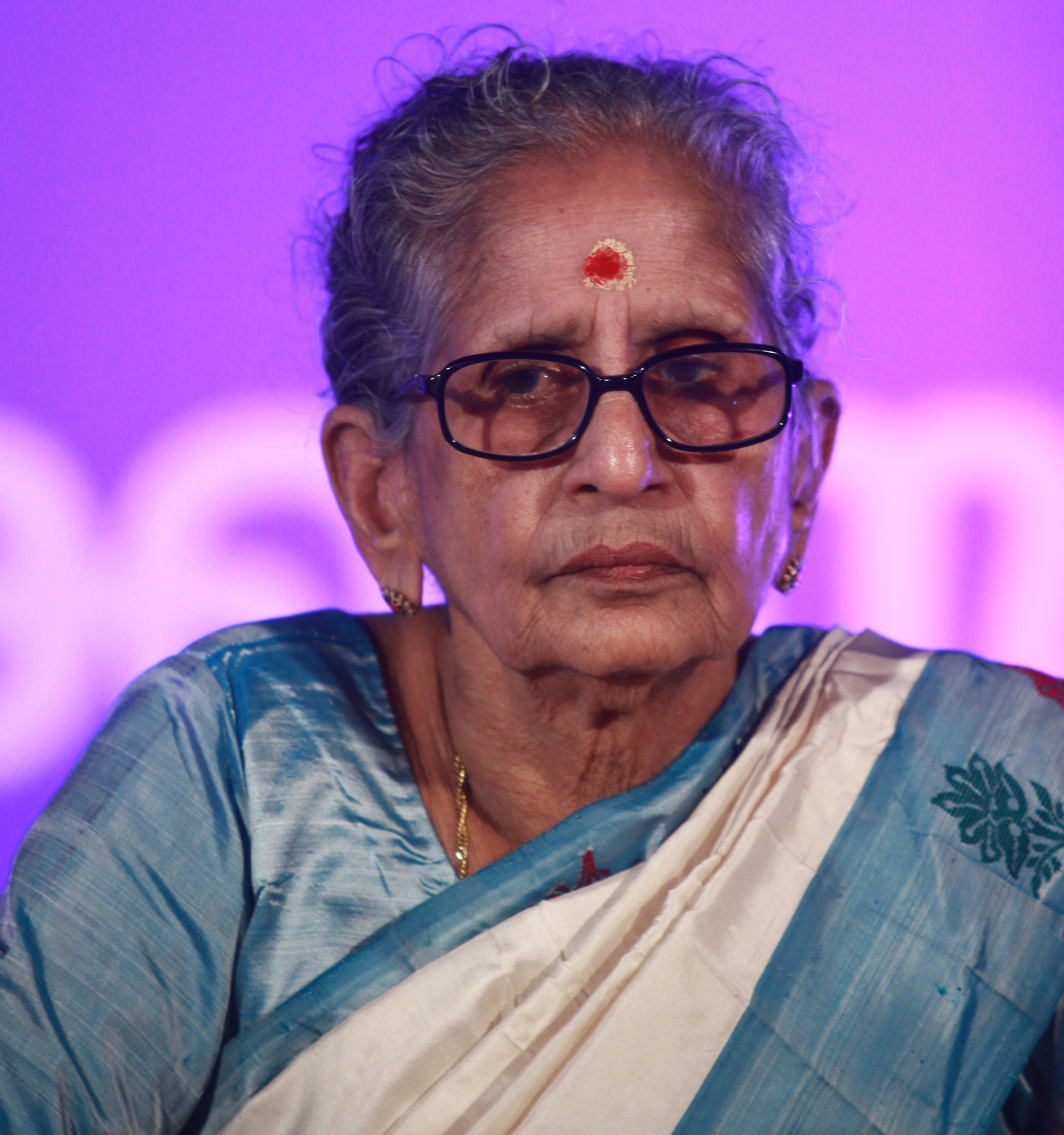
M. Leelavathy (2021)

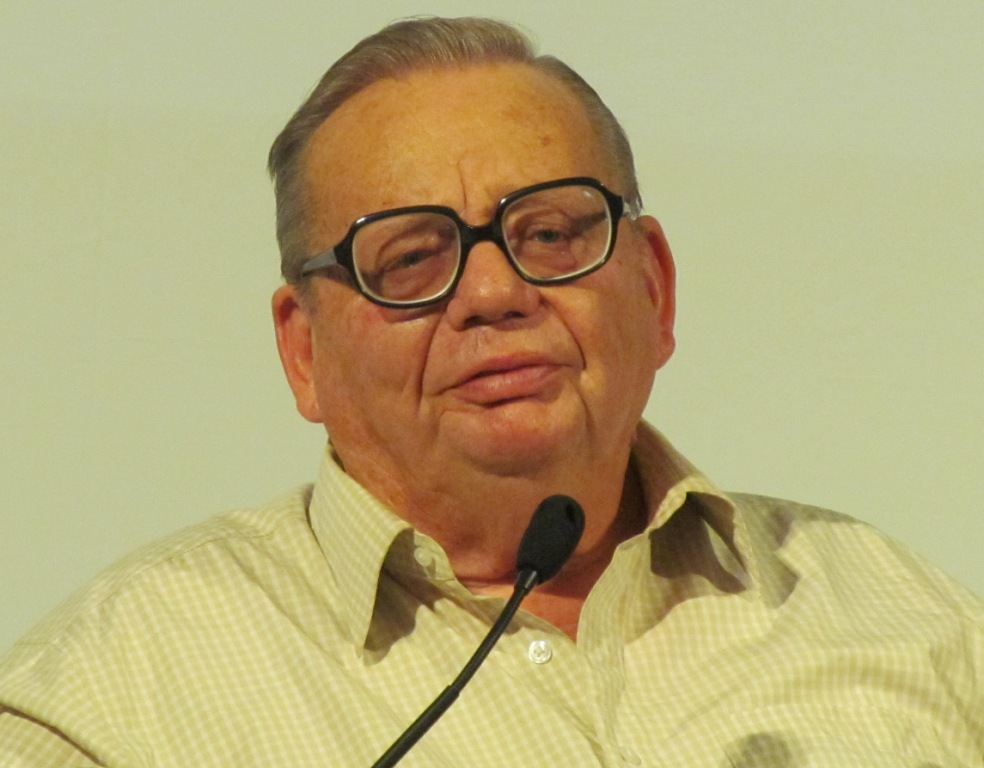
Ruskin Bond (2021)

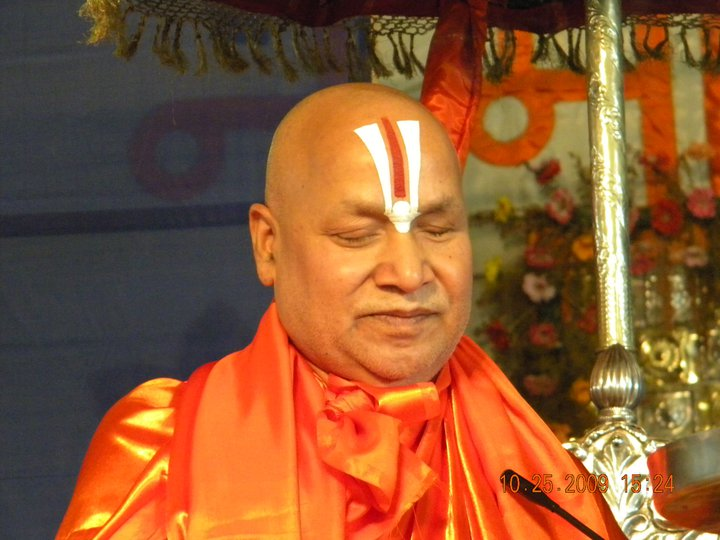
Rambhadracharya (2021)

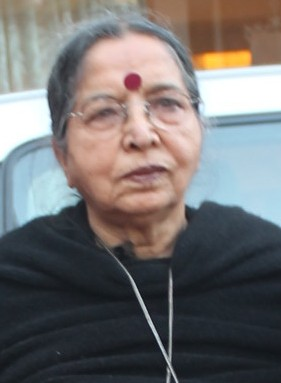
Ajeet Caur (2024)

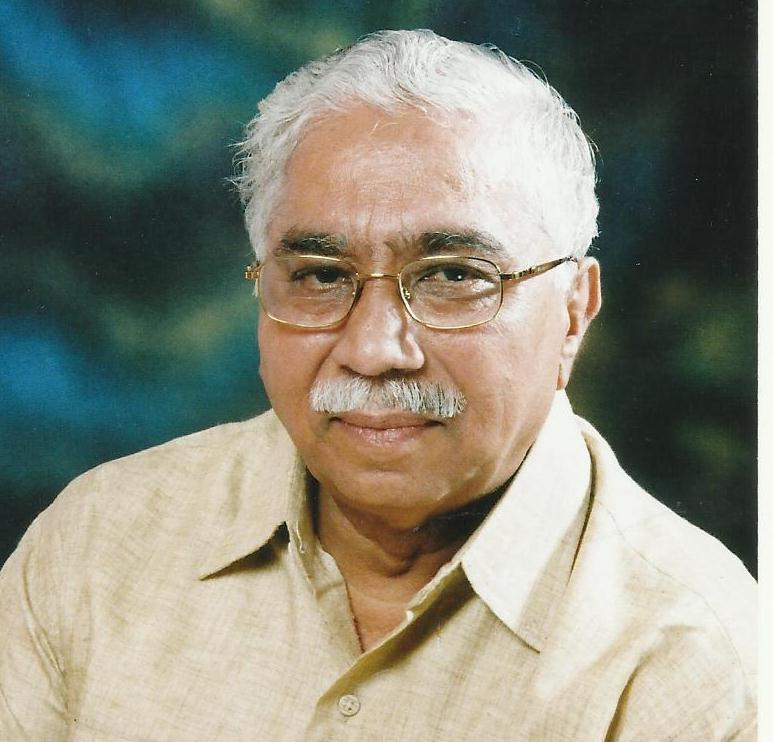
Chandrashekhar Kambar (2024)

Key
#	Indicates a current fellow
†	Indicates Honorary Fellowship
‡	Indicates Premchand Fellowship
§	Indicates Ananda Coomaraswamy Fellowship

List of Sahitya Akademi fellows, showing the year
Year	Recipient	
1968	Sarvepalli Radhakrishnan	
1969	Tarasankar Bandyopadhyay	
1969	D. R. Bendre	
1969	Sumitranandan Pant	
1969	C. Rajagopalachari	
1970	Vaikom Muhammad Basheer	
1970	Firaq Gorakhpuri	
1970	Vishnu Sakharam Khandekar	
1970	Viswanatha Satyanarayana	
1971	Dattatreya Balkrushna Kalelkar	
1971	Gopinath Kaviraj	
1971	Kalindi Charan Panigrahi	
1971	Gurbaksh Singh	
1973	Masti Venkatesha Iyengar	
1973	Mangharam Udharam Malkani	
1973	Nilmoni Phukan	
1973	Vasudev Vishnu Mirashi	
1973	Sukumar Sen	
1973	Vishnuprasad Ranchhodlal Trivedi	
1974	Léopold Sédar Senghor	^{†}
1975	T. P. Meenakshisundaram	
1979	Atmaram Ravaji Deshpande	
1979	Jainendra Kumar	
1979	Kuppali Venkatappa Puttappa 'Kuvempu'	
1979	V. Raghavan	
1979	Mahadevi Varma	
1985	Umashankar Joshi	
1985	K. R. Srinivasa Iyengar	
1985	K. Shivarama Karanth	
1989	Mulk Raj Anand	
1989	Vinayaka Krishna Gokak	
1989	Laxmanshastri Balaji Joshi	
1989	Amritlal Nagar	
1989	Thakazhi Sivasankara Pillai	
1989	Annada Shankar Ray	
1994	Nagarjun	
1994	Balamani Amma	
1994	Ashapoorna Devi	
1994	Qurratulain Hyder	
1994	Vishnu Bhikaji Kolte	
1994	Kanhu Charan Mohanty	
1994	P. T. Narasimhachar	
1994	R. K. Narayan	
1994	Harbhajan Singh	
1996	Jayakanthan	
1996	Senake Bandaranayake	§
1996	Edward C. Dimock	†
1996	Daniel H. H. Ingalls Sr.	†
1996	Vinda Karandikar	
1996	Chie Nakane	§
1996	Vidya Niwas Mishra	
1996	Subhash Mukhopadhyay	
1996	Raja Rao	
1996	Sachidananda Routray	
1996	Azad N. Shamatov	§
1996	Krishna Sobti	
1996	Ji Xianlin	†
1996	Kamil Zvelebil	†
1999	Syed Abdul Malik	
1999	K. S. Narasimhaswamy	
1999	Gunturu Seshendra Sarma	
1999	Rajendra Shah	
1999	Ram Vilas Sharma	
1999	N. Khelchandra Singh	
2000	Ramchandra Narayan Dandekar	
2000	Rehman Rahi	
2001	Ram Nath Shastri	
2002	Kaifi Azmi	
2002	Eugene Chelyshev	†
2002	Govind Chandra Pande	
2002	Nilmani Phookan	
2002	Bhisham Sahni	
2002	Vassilis Vitsaxis	†
2004	Kovilan	
2004	U. R. Ananthamurthy	
2004	Vijaydan Detha	
2004	Shankha Ghosh	
2004	Bhadriraju Krishnamurti	
2004	Amrita Pritam	
2004	Nirmal Verma	
2005	Intizar Hussain	‡
2006	Manoj Das	
2006	Vishnu Prabhakar	
2007	Ronald E. Asher	†
2007	Anita Desai	#
2007	Kartar Singh Duggal	
2007	Ravindra Kelekar	
2009	Gopi Chand Narang	
2009	Ramakanta Rath	
2010	Chandranath Mishra Amar	
2010	Kunwar Narayan	
2010	Bholabhai Patel	
2010	Kedarnath Singh	
2010	Khushwant Singh	
2013	Raghuveer Chaudhari	#
2013	Arjan Hasid	
2013	Sitakant Mahapatra	#
2013	M. T. Vasudevan Nair	
2013	Asit Rai	#
2013	Satya Vrat Shastri	
2013	Abhimanyu Unnuth	†
2014	Santeshivara Lingannaiah Bhyrappa	
2014	C. Narayana Reddy	
2016	Nirendranath Chakravarty	
2016	Gurdial Singh	
2017	Namvar Singh	
2019	Jayanta Mahapatra	
2019	Padma Sachdev	
2019	Vishwanath Prasad Tiwari	#
2019	Nagen Saikia	#
2020	Velcheru Narayana Rao	^{†}
2021	Shirshendu Mukhopadhyay	#
2021	M. Leelavathy	#
2021	Ruskin Bond	#
2021	Vinod Kumar Shukla	
2021	Bhalchandra Nemade	#
2021	Tejwant Singh Gill	#
2021	Rambhadracharya	#
2021	Indira Parthasarathy	#
2024	Ajeet Cour	#
2024	Chandrashekhar Kambar	#
2024	Pran Kishore Kaul	#
2024	Ved Rahi	

== See also ==
- List of Sangeet Natak Akademi fellows
- List of Lalit Kala Akademi fellows
- Jnanpith Award, annual literary award conferred by the Bharatiya Jnanpith.

== Bibliography ==
- George, Rosemary Marangoly (2013). Indian English and the Fiction of National Literature. Cambridge University Press. p. 285. ISBN 978-1-107-04000-7.
