= Mahakavi (TV series) =

- Genre: Documentary
- Created by: ABP News
- Written by: Prabudha Saurabh
- Directed by: Puneet Sharma
- Narrated by: Kumar Vishwas
- Music by: Zafar Mirza
- Country of origin: India
- Original language: Hindi
- No. of episodes: 10

Production
- Producer: ABP News
- Running time: 60 minutes

Original release
- Release: 5 November 2016 – 2016

Mahakavi is an Indian television documentary series, hosted by poet Kumar Vishwas on Hindi news channel ABP News. It premiered on 5 November 2016. Prior to the beginning of the series, a curtain raiser of the series was aired on 28 October 2016. It aims to bring to the audience life-story, poems and never-seen-before facts about legendary Indian poets. The weekly programme chronicles the life sketch of ten Hindi poets of twentieth century.

The TV series is hosted by the renowned poet Kumar Vishwas. The series is directed by Puneet Sharma and scripted by Prabudha Saurabh. The poems of the legendary poets have been treated with the music. While the composition of music has been done by Dr. Kumar Vishwas himself, the music has been arranged by his team Band Poetica. It is a unique attempt to present the lives of legendary poets with reconstruction and music. Mahakavi is aired every Saturday 10 pm and Sunday at 10 am and 10 pm.

The series would include 10 legendary poets, Ramdhari Singh Dinkar, Dushyant Kumar, Suryakant Tripathi Nirala, Harivansh Rai Bachchan, Mahadevi Verma, Baba Nagarjun, Jaishankar Prasad, Subhadra Kumari Chauhan, Maithili Sharan Gupt and Sachchidananda Vatsyayan Agyey.

The episode featuring the story of Ramdhari Singh Dinkar was aired on 5 November 2016. The second episode featured the story of poet Dushyant Kumar on 12 November 2016. The third episode was aired on 19 November 2016 and carried the story of poet Suryakant Tripathi Nirala

== Reception ==
The series was an instant news maker since its first episode. Several prominent people appreciated the concept and tweeted for it. The list includes TV anchor and RJ Richa Anirudh, Bollywood and TV actor Asif Sheikh, RJ Raunac, Singer Sonu Nigam, Bollywood music director Vishal Dadlani, Bollywood actor Swara Bhaskar, Quiz Master and Producer Siddhartha Basu, Cricketer Ricky Bhui, Television actor Saurabh Raj Jain, Bollywood lyricist Rahat Indori, Tips Industries Limited fame Kumar Taurani, Producer Director Prakash Jha, Bollywood lyricist Manoj Muntashir, Roadies (TV series) fame Actor Raghu Ram, Film maker and Journalist Vinod Kapri, Bollywood producer director Shirish Kunder, Folk singer Malini Awasthi, Deputy Chief Minister of Delhi Manish Sisodia, Author and RJ Neelesh Misra, Electoral Expert CVoter chief Yashwant Deshmukh, Bollywood actor Richa Chadda

=== Social media ===
The show was an instant hit and created a lot of curiosity on the internet, so much so that #महाकवि trended on Twitter on first spot on 6 November 2016. [ {Music by Janab Zafar Mirza} ]

== See also ==
- 7 RCR (TV Series)
- Bharatvarsh (TV Series)
- Samvidhaan (TV Series)
- Satyamev Jayate (TV series)
- Pradhanmantri (TV Series)
