= Mera Parivar =

Memoir collection by Mahadevi Varma

- Cover of English translation
- Author: Mahadevi Varma
- Original title: मेरा परिवार
- Translator: Ruth Vanita
- Language: Hindi
- Genre: Memoir
- Publisher: Kitab Mahal (first edition), Lokbharti Prakashan (current), Penguin India (English translation)
- Publication date: 1972
- Publication place: India
- English publication date: 2021
- ISBN: 8180313085 (2008 edition)

Mera Parivar (Hindi: मेरा परिवार, romanized: Merā Parivār, lit. 'My Family') is a Hindi memoir collection written by Mahadevi Varma and published in 1972. This is the author's final original prose work, excluding compilations of earlier writings and collections of speeches.

== Content ==
The book contains nine memoirs about various pet animals, distributed across seven chapters. Each chapter is titled after the name given to the animal by the author. In sequence, they are:

- Neelkanth—the peacock
- Gillu—the squirrel
- Sona—the doe
- Durmukh—the rabbit
- Gaura—the cow
- Neelu—the dog
- Nikki—the mongoose
- Rosie—the she-dog
- Rani—the mare

The sketches present detailed accounts of the author’s interactions with various animals, portraying them as significant and cherished members of her household. The book has been translated to English by Ruth Vanita.

== See also ==
- Kholstomer
- Hindi literature
- List of Hindi writers
- The Elephant Whisperer
