= Eugene Chelyshev =

Russian Indologist (1921–2020)

- Евгений Челышев
- Born: 27 October 1921; Moscow, Russian SFSR
- Died: 13 July 2020 (aged 98); Moscow, Russia
- Occupation: Academician

Eugene Petrovich Chelyshev or E. P. Chelyshev (Russian: Евгений Петрович Челышев, 27 October 1921 – 13 July 2020) was a Russian Indologist, academician and public figure. He was a full-time member of the Russian Academy of Sciences (1987), and he was the Academician-Secretary of the Department of Literature and Language Sciences (1988–2002), and a member of the Presidium of the Russian Academy of Sciences. He was awarded two Orders of the Red Star (1944, 1949), Order of the Patriotic War II degree (1985), Order "For Merit to the Fatherland" IV Degree (1997), III degree (2007), II degree (2020), Order of Honour (2012). Member of the Writers' Union of Russia.

== Biography ==
Chelyshev was born on 27 October 1921, to a Moscow merchant family. In 1939, after graduating from high school, he started his studies at the Moscow Institute of Chemical Engineering. A freshman, he was drafted into the army and sent to flight school in the military townlet Sescha in Oryol Military District.

In 1949, he graduated from the Military Institute of Foreign Languages of the Red Army (Eastern Division) and enrolled in post-graduate courses. In 1952, he defended his thesis in linguistics and obtained the degree of Candidate of Sciences. Until the closing of the institute in 1956, he remained the head of the department of Indian languages.

After his discharge with the rank of Lieutenant Colonel, Chelyshev worked for over 30 years at the Institute of Oriental Studies of the Russian Academy of Sciences, where he was the head of the Indian Philology department. At the same time, he became the director of the Department of Indian Languages, Moscow State Institute of International Relations, Ministry of Foreign Affairs of the USSR (1956–1975). In 1965, he wrote his thesis on Indian literature and obtained the degree of Doctor of Sciences. In 1981 Chelyshev was elected a corresponding member of the USSR Academy of Sciences, and in 1987, a full member of the USSR Academy of Sciences. A year later he was elected Academician-Secretary of the Department of Literature and Language of the Academy of Sciences of the USSR Academy of Sciences and was a member of the Presidium of the Russian Academy of Sciences.

== Academic career ==
His main subjects of research were: Literary and Cultural Studies, Comparative Literature, Indian philology.

In 2002, he was awarded India's fourth-highest civilian award, Padma Bhushan (Order of the Lotus) along with Russian scientist Gury Marchuk In 2004 he became the first Russian to be awarded the Sahitya Akademi Fellowship by the Government of India.

Chelyshev has been a member of the Writers' Union for the last 30 years. During the preparation and conduct of the 200th anniversary of the birth of Alexander Pushkin, as a member of the "Pushkin Jubilee Committee", he led a large group of academicians for which he was awarded Medal of Pushkin by the President of the Russian Federation.

He was a member of the Bureau of Indian Philosophical Society, and a member of The Asiatic Society.

=== Vivekananda research and cultivation ===
Chelyshev was a researcher and admirer of Swami Vivekananda. For more than last thirty years he has been researching on and working to spread the culture and message of Vivekananda. He was one of the vice-presidents of the Committee for Comprehensive Study of Ramakrishna Vivekananda Movement.

He told about Vivekananda—

I think that Vivekananda's greatest service is the development in his teaching of the lofty ideals of humanism which incorporate the finest features of Indian culture.... In my studies of contemporary Indian literature, I have more than once had the opportunity to see what great influence the humanistic ideals of Vivekananda have exercised on the works of many writers.... [In] Vivekananda's humanism, we recognize that it possesses many features of active humanism manifested above all in a fervent desire to elevate man, to instill in him a sense of his own dignity, sense of responsibility for his own destiny and the destiny of all people, to make him strive for the ideals of good, truth and justice, to foster in man abhorrence for any suffering.... Together with the Indian people, Soviet people who already know some of the works of Vivekananda published in the USSR, highly revere the memory of the great Indian patriot, humanist and democrat, impassioned fighter for a better future for his people and all mankind.

== Bibliography ==
- Modern Hindi poetry. (Современная поэзия хинди.) Moscow, 1965;
- Suryakant Tripathi 'Nirala'. (Сурьякант Трипатхи Нирала.) Moscow, 1978;
- Contemporary Indian literature. (Современная индийская литература.) Moscow, 1981;
- Sumitranandan Pant: The Singer of the Himalayas. (Сумитранандан Пант. Певец Гималаев.) Moscow, 1985;
- Indian literature yesterday and today. (Индийская литература вчера и сегодня.) Moscow, 1988;
- Selected Works. In three volumes. (Избранные труды. В 3 томах.) Moscow, 2002;
- Russian Emigration: 1920-30-ies. History and modernity. (Российская эмиграция: 1920-30-е годы. История и современность.) Moscow, 2002.
- Uzkoye Estate and Vladimir Solovyov. M., 2012. (Усадьба Узкое и Владимир Соловьёв; co-authored with M. Yu. Korobko).
