= Links in the Chain =

List of essays by Indian writer Mahadevi Varma

Links in the Chain (Hindi: Srinkhala ki Kadiyan) is a collection of essays by Indian writer Mahadevi Varma (1907–1987) on women's inequality in India. The essays were written between 1931 and 1937 for the literary journal Chand, and were later published together as a volume in 1942. Neera Kuckreja Sohoni, in the intro to her English translation, states that they "touch on common, but crucial and in most respect contemporary themes: the effects of war on women, the dilemma of the home and the beyond…the challenge of modernity…the restraints that shackle women forcing some into making life a commercial venture through prostitution, and lastly the art of meaningful living."

Mahadevi Varma, being a pioneer of a new literary movement in Hindi literature, known as Chhayavad, documents the plight of the oppressed and marginalized Indian woman, the dehumanization and subjugation of her existential identity by patriarchal forces, and her resultant counter-reaction of disrobing her womanhood. It does not only restrict its content to cogitation over the unageing plight of women itself but also provides certain solutions to the conundrums that the essayist puts forward.

Critics have compared Links in the Chain favourably to Simone de Beauvoir's The Second Sex.

== Overview ==
1. "Links in Our Chain" (1931)

"Links in Our Chain", basically, arrives in two halves, and deliberates the fallen status of Indian women in society, and brings to light their deep-seated ignorance towards the antithesis of the apathy inflicted upon them, at the same time.

Employing an analogy of an unsurpassable, delicate "object" - that becomes subject to both veneration and inconsideration- to draw a parallel with a modern Indian woman's sequestered life, and branding "a woman's mental development" to be "swifter than a man's", Varma asserts that women of ancient times had possessed "a deep philosophical view of life", and were garlanded as a man's "sahdharmacharini, the sharer of his dharma, and sahbhagini, sharer of his fortunes." Women, like those who belonged to the Aryan civilization; or, like "Maitreyi"(wife to "Yaagyavalkya"; breathed meaning into the "well-known invocation, "Tamaso ma jyotirgamaya, mrityoh ma amritam gamaya"- lead me from darkness to light, from mortality to immortality"), "Yashodhara"(who preferred to await her husband, "Buddha", "in her own sanctum, instead of rushing to embrace his feet like the dust"), or "Sita", likewise (who was courageous enough to boldly question her husband's "illustrious lineage") resented from being mere shadows of their respective male counterparts, but yearned to be their head-strong companions- "to be remembered for their independent personality and their strong sense of duty."

However, women of the present times, to Varma, are either "oblivious of the fact that they are members of the vast human society and possess an independent self, the blossoming or decline of which can cause society to excel or decline" or are intoxicated with a desire "to gain disparity with men, by viewing the world singularly from the man's optic and mimicking his attributes and vices." And, as a result, collapse to achieve the liberation that they are worthy of, and remain veiled under a thousand cloaks of tradition and meaningless conventions. The sensitive episode of the talented, poor Judith (from Virginia Woolf's 1929 extended essay, A Room of One's Own), nestling a dream in her heart, being engulfed by the ruthless London streets easily fits in this context.

And, at the same time, Indian women remain blind to a self-evident fact that behind every success that a man boasts of, a woman- reckoning her loss in the establishment of a man's unageing reputation- stands, just like cogitation over The Corps of Discovery Expedition (05/1804 - 09/1806) remains incomplete without an invocation of the name of young Sacagawea.

Highlighting a woman's "ignorance related to citizenship" and "countless judicial and legal rights", Varma inscribes the loss of a woman's "individual identity", and the resultant loss of her "ability to reason"; her rising inclination towards a blind imitation of man and his actions [this mimetic trait could also be traced in literary writings by women in the West that span between the years 1840 to 1880, as Elaine Showalter frames it in her 1979 essay, "Towards a Feminist Poetics"]; her reluctance to "gentleness and sentimentality"; her hollow definitions of sacrifice; and the synonymy between the natures of the male and the female as stimulation to walk towards regression.

The Indian woman easily accepts subjugation and oppression in the name of family honour and family image and tends to defy what the Vedic sage, "Manu" had to declare, "Yatraitastu na pujyante sarvastrataphala kriya" ("where she is not revered, all effort is in vain"), and remains unacquainted with what Tehmina Durrani deliberated in her 1994 autobiography, My Feudal Lord:

"Silence condones injustice, breeds subservience, and fosters a malignant hypocrisy."

To Varma, unlike the enlightened women of "both East and West", who have snapped "those fetters that men… had used to enslave them in a brutal display of their ownership" to arrive as his equal, Indian women remain ignorant of the legal rights that could set them free from the incarcerated walls of a home. Even those who belonged to the genteel hierarchy had no time to soar high as enlightened souls and cogitate over women's rights, deeming books and a dagger of the reason their ultimate means to absolve themselves. According to the essayist, altruism demands a renouncement of all "comforts and luxuries"; a sacrifice of security as Simone de Beauvoir asserts in her 1949 philosophical French treatise, The Second Sex.

Elucidating the lives of "women who work in mills and factories" as evidencing a chaotic dilemma of belongingness, Mahadevi Varma strongly believes that such enlightened women could possibly obliterate social evils- like Sati practice- that survive as ugly blots over the Indian society and incarcerate women on social and political grounds.

According to Varma, Indian women have always bravely battled varying acrid tribulations. And, a path to a dignified, liberal life could only be written through resilience and devotion.

Varma strongly upheld this stance that a woman, who could incessantly sustain the heat of burning camphor placed over her soft palms at the call of adversity, was never any "less powerful than man", and that her feminine strength could easily eclipse the marginalization that society garlands her with, and make the "iron fetters" melt like wax in the blaze of her dignity.

2. "War and Woman" (1933)

"War and Woman" forms a major part of the present collection, proposing a blatant transmogrification that women encountered in all these years because of wars.

Drawing a bridge between the stone and the modern age to highlight a "concrete reality", Varma questions man's selfishness and his increasing inclination towards wars and gore violence, and the trepidation psyche of women while the male lot happily participated in wars. She, further, asserts that this barbarity of man has been doctored by women and that the process of transformation from boorishness to tenderness has been feasible only by virtue of women's "innate common sense". It was the foundation of a sentimental institution called "home" at the hands of women that digressed the ugly medieval trajectory towards genteel civilization, emotionally binding man with his family and their expectations.

However, with a sudden upheaval of greed and cold materialism, a woman's constant pieces of advice challenged the superiority and intellectuality of man in domestic and social life, provoking an assertion about women's fragile anatomy being the sole reason for her abhorrence towards wars.

In response to which, women soared high, and deemed weapons their ornaments, and war a tool to seek revenge from the 'supreme creator', to undermine the stereotypical opinions of the male lot, which, however, resulted in man's ultimate triumph- their needs were cultivated; their "army of women" was established and was ready to behead the infants of others.

3. "The Curse of Womanhood" (1933)

"The Curse of Womanhood" tends to bring to light a woman's eroding "individuality, liveliness and aspirations" by a landslide of "sacrifice, forbearance and self-abnegation"; and the extinguishing of the candle of equality in the name of her "frailty".

Beginning with a poignant presentation of the transfixed status of Indian women whose "ascent" and "descent" arrives as incapable of changing the course of her fettered life- deeming the old saying true, "Na sawan sukhe, Na bhado hare"-the essayist inscribes the uncontrollable agony, spiritual asphyxiation, and the dismantling of feminine strength, by the male lot, and that have compelled women, since time immemorial, to ignore their human self and wear a cloak of divinity- only to assume "a divine image".

Varma deeply explores the rising conundrums and hardships that women incessantly face- from being governed under the ruthless rituals and traditions of widowhood (as in the case of Jyoti from Bharati Mukherjee's 1989 novel, Jasmine) to live as a "neglected human being", devoid of compassion, within the four cemented walls of her husband's territory; from being uplifted as "a statue, devoid of all pulsation, vibrancy and human failings" to being made to endure the pain of "abduction"- and powerfully refers to the nerve-racking episodes of Sita's 'Agni-Pariksha’ and the beheading of Renuka by the axe of "Parashuram" at the command of his father, Jamadagni, to elucidate the plight of women, and cogitate over womanhood as a curse.

This social imprisonment of women, and their undeterred subjugation from walking on the path to freedom, has its seed in the shastra: "Stri na swaantantryam arhati".

Ironically deliberating about the current status of Indian women, the essayist asserts that her emancipation is feasible only by a "few enlightened women and the male society". To Varma, only until man would stop thinking of a woman as his subordinate, stimulating the establishment of a more sympathetic outlook, a progressive society could not be brought to life. To the essayist, "a nation-wide movement", working in favour of women, is required to come down to common streets that "will arouse everyone and encourage them to strive in the desired direction" and eradicate all "cruelties that are a blot on the human race".

4. "The Modern Woman: A Look at her Status" (1934)

"The Modern Woman", basically, arrives as one such piece, in two sections, that voices women's "dissatisfaction at her [own] status", who seems anxious about self-identification, and highlights the "apparent differences between woman and man" to be a veracious cause of her miserable predicament.

Questioning the game of "give and take" played between the two biological constructs, the essay traces a dichotomy between the woman of India and that of the West (in whom, an image of a "progressive, self-centred woman" could be best visualized), where the economic independence of the latter is appreciated- an idea that stimulates the central thought of the essay; an idea reverberated by almost every feminist thinker, including Virginia Woolf (in A Room of One's Own) and John Stuart Mill (in "The Subjection of Women").

In an attempt to seek permanent solutions to her depravity, the Indian woman "finally rebelled", and deemed the western woman "her guiding spirit", assuming the form of "another man", as the essayist addresses her in "War and Woman".

Moving to the second half of the essay, Varma dichotomizes the modern woman into three distinct categories- akin to the "three streams of Triveni"- that easily unfolds the deeper meaning of life: i. "those who have set aside their age-long fetters and given unprecedented help to men in the last few years to make [the] political movement dynamic"; ii. those "who have made their education and awareness a means of livelihood as well as means for public welfare"; and, iii. those "who have combined their meagre education with considerable Western modernity to cast their domestic life into a new mould."

As the essay goes down the line, Varma begins to cogitate over the definition of modernity that varied from woman to woman in accordance to their own needs, taking up the encounters faced by women, who participated in national movements, as an archetype, and who "perceived modernity as a form of national awakening".

Employing rebellion (in almost every essay of Links in the Chain, 'rebellion' has been showcased as the primary medium of female emancipation) as her "infallible weapon", the essay turns to assert that "the enlightened and educated women of today" only remembers "the factors responsible for her deplorable condition", and now only yearns to seek the ultimate goal. Her task would uplift her quality of living:

"The task of the woman- a forerunner of revolution and the flag-bearer of freedom- will conclude with the wholesome reconstruction of life and not its destruction."

"The Modern Woman", therefore, finally ends on a note of gleeful hope, only if humanity, exclusively women, understands the deeper nuances of life, and take rebellion only as a means to express discontentment and to assert one's demands to achieve an exuberant future.

5. "Home and Beyond" (1934)

"Home and Beyond"- divided into three distinct parts- takes up the subject of the age-old inhibitions, imposed on women, is significantly contributing to the development of society as a whole.

Assigning a "fixed solitary goal" to achieve, the essayist asserts that women were marginalized within the four walls of the home in an attempt to nurture their "innate gentleness... motherhood" and womanhood, which only stimulated the emergence of a dilemmatic predicament before them- as to where does their work-zone lie, "within the home or beyond".

However, with "the current of time", Varma proposes, the birth of rebellion took place that made the male lot work according to logic and reason, and synthesized co-ordination, between the home and beyond, amongst the 'second sex', relegating the age-old thought- "It should be so because it has always been so."- to the background.

Proposing, before women, to assume the role of the British writer, Aphra Behn (that is, to earn through writing, or working in the field of literature), Varma highlights that progression of feeble individualities is practically possible only through the determination of the position of man, which would leave, both woman and man, in a state to be addressed either as "progressive individuals or mere automatons".

6. "The Hindu Woman's Wifehood" (1934)

"The Hindu Woman's Wifehood", basically, comes up to address "development and destruction" as the two sides of a 'change-named coin', and, consequently, draws an analogy between the positive-and-constructive and negative-and-destructive changes that occur in "flowing water" and "stagnant water" respectively, where the static and mundane nature of women's societal and domestic existence makes her assume the role of the latter.

Highlighting the supremacy of the notion of education over the institution of marriage, Varma addresses the "primary goal" of women to be either wifehood or motherhood- a thought that reverberates in "Home and Beyond"- where she is expected to mould herself into either a loving nurturer of children or an object of man's sexual gratification (as in the case of Mohammadi Begum from Rashid Jahan's 1932 one-act play, Behind the Veil).

This objectification of her identity, and the society's undeterred unacceptability of her 'self', stimulated her ornamentation of rebellion as a means to attain liberation and emancipation; the replacement of imposed "roles" with obvious "duties"; the denouncement of "grahastha ashram" as a subjugating phase of life; and the dilapidation of the country's "remaining dignity" because of society's inability to understand her plight, where Varma concludes her essay.

7. "The Trafficking of Life" (1934)

"The Trafficking of Life" arrives as a rather sensitive piece, in two distinct parts, that brings to light the subject of prostitution as a means of livelihood for a few women.

Showcasing the delicate framework of a woman, who attempted to control man by virtue of the "strength of her feminity", Varma brands a woman's arrival into the phase of motherhood- a change of roles- as solely responsible for the gesticulation of the male lot's transgression towards prostitution; "the decline of the human race from time to time."

"The Trafficking of Life" dichotomizes the role of a wife and that of a prostitute: where a wife assumes the form of "the holy water of the Ganga"- incapable of feeding a man's bestiality; a prostitute, on the other hand, is "like wine"- eternally young, providing momentary pleasure, and approached only for the sake of entertainment.

The present essay tends to highlight the miserable plight of scarlet women and the trauma and diabolical risks that their profession brings. And even though it supports their livelihood, a dignified life could never be achieved, which is because of man's partial and crippled outlook towards life and women, and because of society's marginalized mechanism that deprives women, and women alone, obliterating every ray of hope and "change in the lives of these fallen women."

8. "The Issue of Woman's Economic Independence"(1935)

The present piece, "The Issue of Woman's Economic Independence", basically, highlights- in two sections- the supremacy of wealth in a global context that "has always been a blind follower of power", as Varma writes.

Resonating the stance that Virginia Woolf poses in her 1929 extended essay, A Room of One's Own, about the economic independence of women over man and the absence of a room (a metaphor for self-identification) of her own, the essayist asserts that in the Indian sub-continent, women "received the exalted status of a sahdharmacharini for participating in the religious activities and that of a grahini for looking after the house", and that man was garlanded as "the grihapati, the master of the house", proposing that this domestic dichotomy solely held the onus for the inferior status of women both in-home and beyond.

Identifying the notion of "dissatisfaction" as the source of bewilderment in society, the essay highlights that the liberation of women would only stimulate an optimistic progression of society and that until man would stop thinking of a woman as "either a means of comfort or a burden", the development of the country in a constructive way won't be feasible. Varma affirms that the economic independence of women is the key to a gleeful life- a stance that every feminist would agree with.

9. "Our Problems" (1936)

Divided into two distinct halves, "Our Problems", basically, begins with sketching a concrete line of the dichotomy between "the educated and uneducated classes, much like the Ganga and Yamuna", and tends to highlight the contradictory function that education, in the modern times, performs- that of a dividing chasm.

Taking the support of tradition, the essayist asserts, however, the Indian women, on the contrary, took education as a key to "strength and power"; as a forceful medium that would help them remove the tag of "the mistresses of the kingdom of ignorance". Varma provides a quintessence of the enlightened role that women are performing "in the field of medicine" to support her stance in this context.

According to Varma, women took education as a means of the humanization of character and realized the true value of education in a being's intellectual development. However, the institution of marriage and the "flawed social arrangements related to" it, soon dilapidated the possibility of a better future for women, in particular, and society, in general, and made education assume the verisimilitude of a thought that could reach the zenith of efficacy.

The orthodox and tapered framework, and outlook, of society towards female emancipation, to the essayist, becomes the basic foundation over which several other correspondent problems cultivate, and also the reason behind the bitterness and agony of womankind at the same time.

10. "Society and the Individual" (1937)

"Society and the Individual" exclusively arrives to deal with the mutual "relationship between the individual and society" [as the title suggests], and calls for an internally consistent harmony between the two.

Varma, further, asserts that "society has two foundation stones- the distribution of wealth and the relationship between man and woman"- where the latter draws the attention of the essayist, who strongly believes that it is prejudiced and has been doctored with; it is "a form of bestiality which lacked responsibility."

Highlighting the absence of unification, "the disparity in the distribution of wealth", and the deplorable "status accorded to… women", as the primary reasons behind the trepidations of the society's foundation, Varma affirms that unless society and its individuals work in accordance with each other, a healthy social order could not be established. She stresses the fact that a "despotic (ruling) society can mark the end of humanity."

11. "The Art of Living" (1934)

"The Art of Living", basically, lays its primary emphasis over the mutual symbiosis of "theoretical knowledge and practical application"- as to how one is incomplete without the other.

Addressing the utilization of this mutual symbiosis as the ultimate art of living, Varma brings to light an analogy of paint colours and a paintbrush's varieties to elucidate her point, and further discusses the integration of "the essential norms for living… as aphorisms in [the] sanskars." To Varma, the tenet, "Satyam bruyat- speak the truth", for example, lies sequestered and trivial unless it is practically applied and made the fundamental basis of one's life.

The actual internalization of the above-mentioned tenet arrives when one is able to lie that would save "the life of an innocent", rather than embracing veracity that would only lead to "an innocent's death".

As the essay goes down the line, Varma cogitates over the nationwide ignorance of the art of living as a curse, and inscribes the apathy that has been inflicted upon Indian women since time immemorial because of her ignorance of "that art of living".

To the essayist, the divine qualities that an Indian woman is adorned with are enough to make a "woman of any other nation a goddess". However, an Indian woman's "spirit of sacrifice" and "limitless fortitude" hinders her quest to "bring those divine qualities alive", subjugating her to an incarcerated position of an "Ardhangini" who is incessantly compelled to embody the attributes of an "ideal Sita-Savitri".

Branding the Hindu woman as a corpse, Varma asserts that somewhere in the middle of this flummoxed predicament, the onus of a relegated status lies with the Indian woman herself. And though she possesses certain principles that could mesmerize her life, a "wrong utilization" of those principles renounces every trace of hope of liberation in her life. An analogy of a "beautiful bracelet" comes forward to explicate the essayist's brisk stance.

Towards the end, Varma holds "the social environment" responsible, at the same time, for a woman's "mute obedience" to the diabolical laws of society. According to her, the feasibility of a better life gets amplified only through a subtle intertwining of "external and internal progress" in both man and woman:

"Only when both the man and the woman become vested with human dignity will the art of living to be able to thrive, with its goal being to make such human traits as kindness, animation and love more and more pervasive."

Mahadevi Varma wrote in support of the emancipation of women in India across multiple domains. In her work Links in the Chain, she addressed the subordination of female identity within patriarchal social structures, and sought to encourage Indian women across caste and class divisions to advance both within the domestic sphere and beyond it.
