= Ram Nath Shastri =

Indian academic (born 1914)

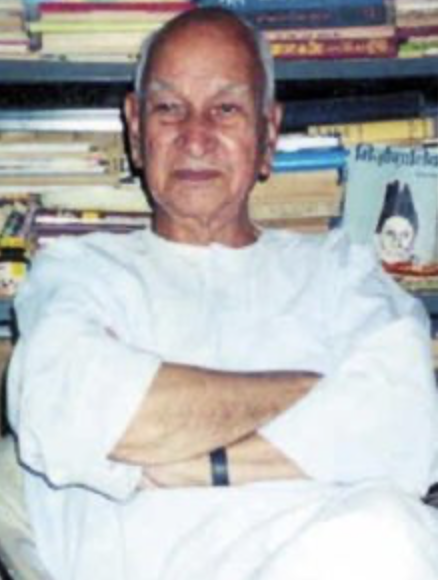
- Born: 15 April 1914; Jammu, India
- Died: 8 March 2009 (aged 94); Jammu, India
- Occupations: Dogri writer; playwright; poet
- Spouse: Sushila Khajuria
- Website: ramnathshastri.org

Padma Shri Ram Nath Shastri (15 April 1914 - 8 March 2009) was known as the "Father of Dogri" for his pivotal role in the revival and resurgence of the Dogri language.

In 2001, he was awarded the Sahitya Akademi Fellowship, awarded by the Sahitya Akademi, India's National Academy of Letters, the highest literary honour conferred by the Government of India.

== Early life and career ==
Prof. Shastri's father, Vaid Gauri Shankar, was an Ayurvedic doctor and originally belonged to a small village Marhi in Reasi tehsil of Udhampur district (now Reasi district). For better prospects, he moved to Jammu. Initially, he wanted Ram Nath to adopt the same profession and instructed him to learn Sanskrit. All ancient scriptures being in Sanskrit, it would be immensely helpful as an Ayurvedic doctor. He joined Ranbir Sanskrit Pathshala at the Ranbir High School. After which, he did post graduation in Sanskrit and Prabhakar in Hindi. He started his career as a high school Sanskrit teacher for five years and later became a college lecturer.

== Founding of Dogri Sanstha ==
On the day of Basant Panchami in 1944, Shastri and five other writers — Dinu Bhai Pant, Sansar Chand Baru, Bhagwat Prasad Sathe, N.D. Mishra, and D.C. Prashant — formally established the Dogri Sanstha, a literary society dedicated to the preservation and propagation of the Dogri language. At the time, Dogri held no official status in the princely state of Jammu and Kashmir, and Dogri-speaking people were widely regarded as culturally lesser even within their own region; the Sanstha was conceived in part as a response to that institutional neglect.

In its early years the Sanstha had neither premises nor funding, and Shastri was central to sustaining it through public mushairas (poetic gatherings), publishing efforts, and the cultivation of a younger generation of Dogri writers. He served as long-time editor of the Sanstha's Dogri literary periodical Nami Chetna, which became an important platform for emerging writers.

In 1956, Shastri co-authored Naman Gran, the first published Dogri play, with Dinu Bhai Pant and Ram Kumar Abrol.

Dogri was eventually included in the Eighth Schedule to the Constitution of India by the Ninety-second Amendment in 2003, granting it official-language status.

In 1970, he retired as a professor in the J&K State Education Department. In 1970, he retired as a professor in the J&K State Education Department. From 1970 to 1975, he was a Senior Fellow in Dogri at the University of Jammu.

From 1977 to 1985, as Chief Editor at the J&K Cultural Academy, he edited the Hindi–Dogri Dictionary.

He died on 8 March 2009, in Jammu.

== Important works ==
- Naman Gran (1956) — Dogri play, co-authored with Dinu Bhai Pant and Ram Kumar Abrol
- Bawa Jitto (1973) — ballad on the Duggar folk hero
- Jhakdian Kiran (1975) — one-act play
- Badnami Di Chhan (1976) — collection of six short stories
- Dharti Da Rin (1977)
- Talkhiyan (1980) — collection of Dogri ghazals
- Duggar De Lok Nayak — prose work on the folk heroes of the Duggar region, including Mian Dido, Bawa Jitto, Ranpat, and Gugga Chauhan
- Kalamkaar Charan Singh
- Ik Ha Raja (edited)

== Translations ==
- Shudraka's Mricchakatika as Mitti Di Gaddi (1989) — Sanskrit play; awarded the Sahitya Akademi Translation Prize
- Six Upanishads in Dogri verse — Katha, Kena, Taittiriya, Aitareya, Prashna, and Isha
- Bhartrihari's Niti Shataka and Vairagya Shataka
- Four short plays of Bhasa
- Bodhayana's Sanskrit play Bhagavadajjukam
- Mahendra Vikrama Varma's Sanskrit play Mattavilasa
- Rabindranath Tagore's Gitanjali, Balidan, Malini, and Dak Ghar
- Mahatma Gandhi's autobiography The Story of My Experiments with Truth
- Vinoba Bhave's Gita Pravachan
- C. Rajagopalachari's Ramayana
- Dharamvir Bharati's Andha Yug, as Anna Yug
- Maxim Gorky's The Lower Depths, as Patal Vasi

== Honours and awards ==
- 2004 — Duggar Rattan Award
- 2001 — Sahitya Akademi Fellowship, the highest literary honour conferred by the Sahitya Akademi
- 1994 — Honorary D.Litt., University of Jammu
- 1991 — J&K State Cultural Academy Award for his Dogri prose work Duggar De Lok Nayak
- 1990 — Padma Shri, India's fourth-highest civilian honour, for Literature & Education
- 1989 — Sahitya Akademi Translation Prize for the Dogri translation of Shudraka's Sanskrit drama Mricchakatika as Mitti Di Gaddi. Shastri was the inaugural recipient of the Sahitya Akademi Translation Prize for Dogri.
- 1989 — Saraf Award
- 1981 — J&K State Cultural Academy Award for his collection of Dogri ghazals Talkhiyan
- 1976 — Sahitya Akademi Award (Dogri) for his short story collection Badnami Di Chhan

== Legacy ==
In 2014, on the occasion of Shastri's birth centenary, his family in collaboration with the Dogri Sanstha instituted the annual Prof. Ram Nath Shastri Memorial Award (also known as the Ram Nath Shastri Smriti Puruskar) to encourage emerging writers in Dogri. The award is conferred each year on a Dogri writer for a first book published within the preceding five years, and consists of a cash prize of ₹21,000 along with a shawl and a memento. The award ceremony is traditionally held on or around 15 April, Shastri's birthday.

Recipients have included Pitambar Nath Sharma (for the novel Bhagaali, 2018), Ashok Ambar (for Nama Savera, 2022), Promila Manhas (for Phullen Ladoi Raat Rani, 2023), Pawan Verma (for Jo Katteya So Maahlein, 2024), and Ritu Singh (for Dogri Mukrian, 2026). Earlier recipients have included Ashok Angurana, Raz Manawari, Ashok Dutta, Susheel Begana, Rajeshwar Singh "Raju", and Shailender Singh.
