= Bharatvarsh (TV series) =

Indian television documentary about history of India

- Genre: Documentary
- Created by: ABP News
- Directed by: Puneet Sharma
- Starring: Anupam Kher
- Narrated by: Anupam Kher
- Country of origin: India
- Original language: Hindi
- No. of episodes: 10

Production
- Producer: ABP News
- Running time: 60 minutes

Original release
- Network: ABP News
- Release: 20 August – 23 October 2016

Bharatvarsh is an Indian television historical documentary series, hosted by actor-director Anupam Kher on Hindi news channel ABP News. It started on 20 August 2016. The show presents thoughts and ideologies of personalities in the 5000-year old history of India and showcases journey from ancient India to the 19th century. Season 1 finished on 23 October 2016.

== Cast ==
- Tej Sapru as Chanakya
- Aham Sharma as Ashoka
- Rohit Bakshi as Chandragupta Maurya
- Ashish Kapoor as Prithviraj Chauhan
- Astha Agarwal as Samyukta
- Mohammed Iqbal Khan as Akbar
- Shiva Rindani as Hemu
- Rohit Purohit as Dara Shikoh
- Sudhanshu Pandey as Shivaji
- Bhavesh Balchandani as Young Shivaji
- Gavie Chahal as Aurangzeb
- Sachin Shroff as Adi Shankara
- Amar Sharma as Shah Jahan

== Episodes ==
=== Season 1 ===
Episode	Topic	Original Air date
1	A Journey From Siddhartha To Gautama Buddha	20 August 2016
2	Story of Chanakya, The Author Of Arthashastra	27 August 2016
3	Story of Mauryan Emperor Ashoka Samrat	3 September 2016
4	Story of Adi Shankaracharya	10 September 2016
5	Story of Prithviraj Chauhan	17 September 2016
6	Story of Kabir	24 September 2016
7	Story of Akbar	1 October 2016
8	Story of Maharana Pratap	8 October 2016
9	Story of Dara Shukoh	15 October 2016
10	Story of Chhatrapati Shivaji	22 October 2016

== Reception ==
The show was well received. One episode was telecasted in Delhi Public School Ghaziabad for students. The episode on Chanakya was screened in Little Angels Convent H S School, Kohe Fiza, Bhopal. In October 2016, Juggernaut Books and ABP News announced the publication of a book based on Bharatvarsh, which will be published in the first quarter of 2017.

=== Social media ===
The show noticed a huge engagement on social media with the #भारतवर्ष trending on Twitter. The hash-tag was promoted heavily by ABP News through a contest on Twitter. The lucky winners of the #भारतवर्ष contest were given Karbonn K9 smartphone.

== See also ==
- Pradhanmantri
- 7 RCR (TV Series)
- Bharat Ek Khoj
- Mahakavi Series
