= Dushyant Kumar =

Indian poet (1931–1975)

Dushyant Kumar Tyagi
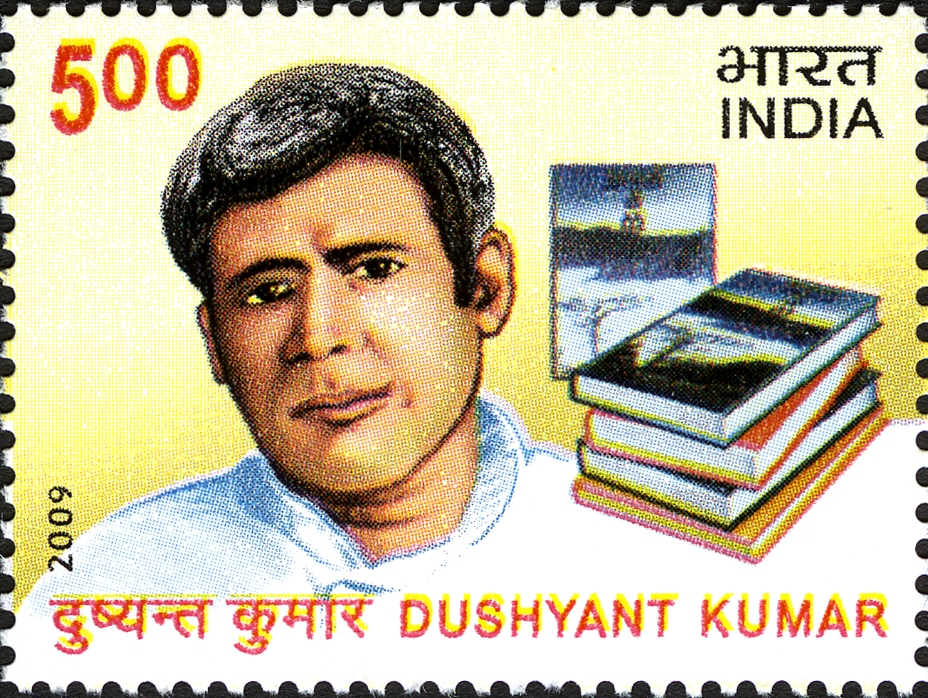
- Kumar on a 2009 stamp of India
- Born: 1 September 1931; Bijnor District, Uttar Pradesh, India
- Died: 30 December 1975 (aged 44); Bhopal, Madhya Pradesh, India
- Education: MA (Hindi), Allahabad
- Occupations: Poet, dramatist, Litterateur, Gazal, translator
- Writing career
- Genre: Hindi poems
- Notable works: Saaye mein Dhoop, Ek Kanth Vishpayi; Mann Ke Kon, published in 1963

Dushyant Kumar Tyagi (1 September 1931 – 30 December 1975) was an Indian poet of modern Hindi literature. He is famous for writing Hindi ghazals, and is generally recognised as one of the foremost Hindi poets of the 20th century.

== Personal life ==
Kumar was married to Rajeshwari Tyagi.

== Legacy ==
- Parts of Kumar's poem ""Ho Gayi hai Peer Parvat Si"(हो गई है पीर पर्वत-सी)" were used in the popular 2017 India film Irada. The film showcases the sorry state of the people of Bathinda (Punjab) due to corruption and cancer caused by pesticides left from the Green Revolution and uranium contamination of ground water due to fly ash from thermal power plants.
- The poem "Ho Gayi hai Peer Parvat Si"(हो गई है पीर पर्वत-सी) was sung often by Arvind Kejriwal during the 2011 Indian anti-corruption movement.
- Kumar's lines from his ghazal 'Saye Me Dhoop' are often used in many programmes and were used in the Hindi film "Halla Bol" मेरे सीने में नहीं तो तेरे सीने मे सही, हो कहीं भी आग, लेकिन आग जलनी चाहिए. Star Plus used the lines "Sirf hungaama khada karna mera maqsad nahin, saari koshish hai, ki yeh soorat badalni chahiye" in promos for its show Satyameva Jayate.
- The Indian Department of Posts issued a commemorative stamp with Kumar's image on it in September 2009.
- A museum dedicated to Kumar exists in C. T. T. Nagar, Bhopal, Madhya Pradesh.
- The line "Tu kisi rail si guzarti hai" was taken from his poems and used as a song in the movie Masaan.
- ABP News and the Hindi poet Kumar Vishwas made an episode on Dushyant Kumar in their program Mahakavi which was aired on 12 and 13 November 2016.
- Kumar's house was broken by the administration of Smart City Project. This was criticised by several leading people.

Explaining the inclusion of Kumar's poems in the 2015 Hindi film Masaan, the lyricist Varun Grover explained that he wanted to show Shaalu (played by Shweta Tripathi) as a person whose hobby is to read Hindi poetry and shaayari, as this is a common hobby of Millennial and Generation X youngsters in Northern India, especially when in love, but this aspect is rarely shown in Hindi films.
