= Nagarjun =

Indian poet (1911–1998)

- Born: Vaidyanath Mishra; 30 June 1911; Satlakha Village, Darbhanga district, Bihar, India
- Died: 5 November 1998 (aged 87); Khwaja Sarai, Darbhanga district, Bihar, India
- Occupations: Poet; writer; essayist; novelist; Buddhist
- Spouse: Aparajita Devi
- Writing career
- Pen name: Nagarjun
- Language: Hindi, Maithili
- Years active: 1930–1994
- Notable awards: 1969: Sahitya Akademi Award; 1994: Sahitya Akademi Fellowship

Vaidyanath Mishra (30 June 1911 – 5 November 1998), better known by his pen name Nagarjun, was a Hindi and Maithili poet who has also penned a number of novels, short stories, literary biographies and travelogues, and was known as Janakavi- the People's Poet. He is regarded as the most prominent protagonist of modernity in Maithili.

== Personal life and biography ==
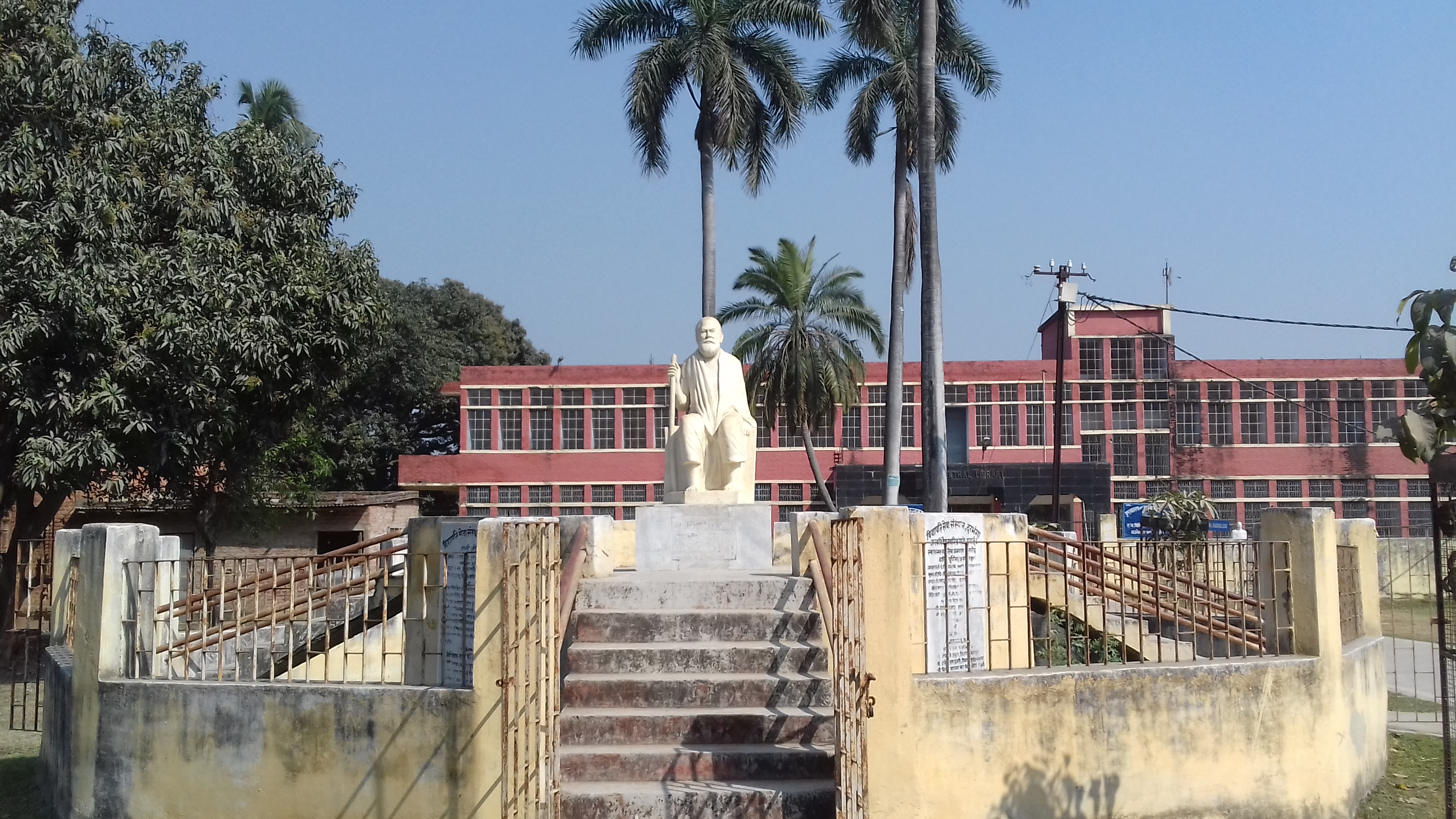
Sculpture of Nagarjun in the Library Park of LN Mithila University

=== Early life and education ===
Vaidyanath Mishra was born on 11 June 1911 (Jyeshtha Purnima), in the Gram Panchayat Tarauni and Block Benipur in Darbhanga District of Bihar, India to Uma Devi and Gokul Mishra. He spent most of his days in his mother's village Satlakha of Madhubani district, Bihar. He later converted to Buddhism and got the name Nagarjun. His mother died when he was only four years old, and his father being a vagabond himself, couldn't support him so young Vaidyanath thrived on the support of his relatives, and the scholarships he won on the account of him being an exceptional student. Soon he became proficient in Sanskrit, Pali and Prakrit languages, which he first learnt locally and later at Varanasi and Calcutta, where he was also semi-employed, while pursuing his studies. Meanwhile, he married Aparajita Devi and the couple had six children.

=== Career ===
He started his literary career with Maithili poems by the pen-name of Yatri (यात्री) in the early 1930s. By the mid-1930s, he started writing poetry in Hindi. His first permanent job of a full-time teacher, took him to Saharanpur (Uttar Pradesh), though he didn't stay there for long as his urge to delve deeper into Buddhist scriptures, took him to the Buddhist monastery at Kelaniya, Sri Lanka, where in 1935, he became a Buddhist monk, entered the monastery and studied the scriptures, just as his mentor, Rahul Sankrityayan had done earlier, and hence took upon the name "Nagarjun". While at the monastery, he also studied Leninism and Marxism ideologies, before returning to India in 1938 to join 'Summer School of Politics' organised by noted peasant leader, Sahajanand Saraswati, founder of Kisan Sabha. A wanderer by nature, Nagarjun spent a considerable amount of his time in the 1930s and the 1940s travelling across India.

He also participated in many mass-awakening movements before and after independence. Between 1939 and 1942, He was jailed by the British courts for leading a farmer's agitation in Bihar. For a long time after independence he was involved with journalism.

He played an active role in Jayaprakash Narayan's movement prior to the Emergency period (1975–1977), and therefore was jailed for eleven months, during the emergency period. He was strongly influenced by Leninist-Marxist ideology. This was one of the reasons that he never found patronage from the mainstream political establishments.

He died in 1998 at the age of 87 in Darbhanga.

== Works and literature ==
The subjects of his poetry are varied. Effects of both his wandering tendencies and activism, is evident in his middle and later works. His famous poems like Bādal kō Ghiratē Dēkhā hai (Hindi: बादल को घिरते देखा है), is a travelogue in its own right. He often wrote on contemporary social and political issues. His famous poem Mantra Kavita (मंत्र कविता), is widely considered the most accurate reflection of a whole generation's mindset in India. Another such poem is Āō Rānī Hum Ḍhōēṅgē Pālakī (Hindi: आओ रानी हम ढोएंगे पालकी), which sarcastically humiliates the then prime minister of India, Jawaharlal Nehru, for the extravagant welcome thrown by him for Queen Elizabeth.

Besides these accepted subjects of poetry, Nagarjun found poetic beauty in unconventional subjects. One of his most astonishing works is a poem based on a show called With Sharp Teeth (पैने दाँतो वाली). Another such creation is a series of poems on a full-grown jackfruit.

Because of the breadth of his poetry, Nagarjun is considered the only Hindi poet after Tulsidas to have an audience ranging from the rural sections of society to the elite. He effectively freed poetry from the bounds of elitism.

== Languages ==
Maithili was his mother tongue and he authored many poems, essays and novels in Maithili. He was educated in Sanskrit, Pali, and Hindi. Hindi remained the language of the bulk of his literature. The Hindi of his works varies from highly sanskritized to vernacular forms. He was a poet of the masses, and preferred to write in the language of immediate local impact. Therefore, he never adhered to specific bounds of languages.

He also had good grasp of the Bengali language and used to write for Bengali newspapers. He was close to the Bengali Hungry generation or Bhookhi Peerhi poets and helped Kanchan Kumari in translating Malay Roy Choudhury's long poem Jakham and Chana Jor Garam in Hindi.

== Awards ==
Nagarjun was given the Sahitya Akademi Award in 1968 for his historic book Patarheen Nagna Gachh, and the 'Bharat Bharati Award' by the Uttar Pradesh government for his literary contributions in 1983. He was also honoured by the Sahitya Akademi Fellowship, India's highest literary award for lifetime achievement, in 1994.

== Major literary works ==
=== Poetry ===
- Yugdharao
- Kal aur Aaaj
- Satrange Pankhon Wali
- Talab ki Machhliyan
- Khichri Viplava Dekha Humne
- Hazar Hazar Bahon Wali
- Purani Juliyon Ka Coras
- Tumne Kaha Tha
- Akhir Aisa Kya Kah Diya Maine
- Is Gubare Ki Chhaya Mein.
- Yeh Danturit Muskaan
- Mein Military Ka Boodha Ghoda
- Ratnagarbha
- Aise bhi hum kya
- Bhool jao purane sapne
- Apne Khet Mein Chandana
- Fasal
- Akal aur Uske bad
- Harijan Gatha
- Badal ko ghirate Dekha hai
- Aaj main beej hoon
- Mantra Kavita

=== Novels ===
- Rati Nath Ki Chachi
- Balachnama
- Baba Bateshar Nath
- Himalaya ki betiya
- Nai Paudh
- Varun Ke Bete
- Dukh Mochan
- Ugratara
- Jamania Ka Baba
- Kumbhi Pak
- Paro and Asman Mein Chanda Tare.
- Abhinandan
- Imaratia
- Sita Usko
- Navturiya

=== Essay collections ===
- Ant Hinam Kriyanam.
- Bum Bholenath
- Ayodhya ka raja

=== Maithili works ===
- Patrahin Nagna Gachh (collection of poems)
- Chitra (collection of poems)
- Pparo(novel)
- Navturiya(novel)
- Balchnma(novel)
- His work on culture has been published in the form of books entitled Desh Dashkam and Krishak Dashkam.

== Works on Baba Nagarjun ==
- Poet Kumar Vishwas and channel ABP News aired a video documentary about the life and writings of Nagarjun in their Mahakavi Series.
