= Jainendra Kumar =

Indian writer

- Born: 2 January 1905; Kodiyaganj, United Provinces of Agra and Oudh, British India
- Died: 24 December 1988 (aged 83)
- Writing career
- Language: Hindi
- Notable works: Parakh; Paap Aur Prakash; Muktibodh
- Notable awards: Padma Bhushan; 1971; Sahitya Akademi Fellowship; 1979; Sahitya Akademi Award; 1966

Jainendra Kumar (2 January 1905 – 24 December 1988) was a 20th-century Indian writer who wrote in Hindi. He wrote novels include Sunita and Tyagapatra. He was awarded one of India's highest civilian honours, the Padma Bhushan in 1971. He was awarded the Sahitya Akademi Award by the Sahitya Akademi in 1966, for his work Muktibodh (novelette), and its highest award, the Sahitya Akademi Fellowship in 1979.

== Literary works ==
- Suneeta
- Neelam Desh ki Rajkanya
- Chidiya Ki Bhachi
- Ek Raat
- Vatayan
- Parakh
- Ankita
- Sukhda
- Kalyani
- Jayvardhan
- Dashark
- Akal Purush Gandhi
- Premchand: Ek Krati Vyaktitva
- Sahitya ka Shrey Aur Prey
- Samay Aur Hum
- Jeevan Sahitya Aur Paramparayein
- Gandhi aur Humara Samay Tatha Sanskriti
- Khel
- Pajeb
- Patni
- Apna Apna Bhagya
- Muktibodh
- "Atma Shikshan" (short story)

=== Translations ===
- Prem Mein Bhagwaan
- Paap Aur Prakash
- Yama

== Awards and honors ==
- Hindustan Academy Puraskar, 1929 for Parakh
- Sahitya Akademi Award, 1953 for Paap Aur Prakash
- Hastimal Dalmiya Puraskar, 1965 for Muktibodh
- Padma Bhushan, 1971
- Sahitya Akademi Fellowship, 1979
