= Abhimanyu Unnuth =

Mauritian writer

Abhimanyu Unnuth (9 August 1937 – 4 June 2018) was a Mauritian writer.

Born in Triolet, Mauritius, Unnuth was a novelist characterized by the description of daily life with extreme realism, denouncing injustice, stupidity and exploitation. He was the author of more than 70 books, all written in Hindi, including verses, prose, and essays. They include The Emperors of the Night (1983) and Sweats of Blood (2001), the most famous trilogy that focuses on the fate of the workers dedicated to the cane fields during colonial Mauritius. He started to write at the age of 14 at the cane fields.

In 2014, he received the Sahitya Akademi Fellowship from the National Academy of Letters of India for his influence in the world of Indian literature.

He died on 4 June 2018 from Alzheimer's disease.
