= Tejwant Singh Gill =

Tejwant Singh Gill is an Indian author and professor of English in Guru Nanak Dev University who got Sahitya Akademi Fellowship in 2021. He is the contributor of The Oxford Handbook of Sikh Studies. He has written more than 25 books.
