= Kauriaganj =

- Town
- Location in Uttar Pradesh, India Kauriaganj (India)
- Coordinates: 27°52′N 78°19′E
- Country: India
- State: Uttar Pradesh
- District: Aligarh

Population (2001)
  - Total: 10,581

Language
  - Official: Hindi
  - Additional official: Urdu
- Time zone: UTC+5:30 (IST)
- Vehicle registration: UP-81

Kauriaganj is a small town and a nagar panchayat in Aligarh district in the Indian state of Uttar Pradesh.

== Demographics ==
At the 2001 India census, Kauriaganj had a population of 10,581 (males 53%, females 47%). Kauriaganj has an average literacy rate of 41% (males 50%, females 31%), lower than the national average of 59.5%. 21% of the population was under 6 years of age.

== Notable people ==
The Hindi writer Jainendra Kumar (1905–1988) was born here.

== Nearby cities ==
- Khair
- Kasganj
- Aligarh
