= Pran Kishore Kaul =

Kashmiri actor, theatre director and screenwriter

Pran Kishore Kaul is a Kashmiri stage personality. In addition to acting, he has directed and written screenplays. He received Sahitya Akademi Award for his novel Sheen Tu Watu Pod. He was one of the founders of the Miltsar Kashmir Music & Dance Group, a group that travels widely with the goal of supporting Kashmiri and Indian arts.

Pran Kishore Kaul is best known as the creator of 1991 Doordarshan television serial Gul Gulshan Gulfaam. He is also a recipient of Siliver peacock for the feature film Maanzirath and was instrumental in major cultural activities that took place in the Kashmir valley since past five decades thus made a unique contribution and place in the field. In 2018, Kaul was awarded with the civilian award Padma Shri.
