= Deepshikha =

Hindi poetry collection by Mahadevi Varma

- Title page of the first edition
- Author: Mahadevi Varma
- Original title: दीपशिखा
- Illustrator: Mahadevi Varma
- Language: Hindi
- Genre: Poem
- Publisher: Kitabistan and Bharati Bhandar (former); Vani Prakashan and Lokbharti Prakashan (current)
- Publication date: 1942; 84 years ago
- Publication place: British India
- Media type: Print (Hardcover and Paperback)
- Pages: 75 (first edition)
- ISBN: 8180311198 (2008 edition by Lokbharti Prakashan)

Deepshikha (Hindi: दीपशिखा, romanized: Dīpśikhā, lit. 'Crest of the Flame') is a collection of lyric poetry in Hindi composed by Mahadevi Varma and published in 1942. It was Mahadevi's final major poetry collection to embody the sensibilities of Chhayavad. Thereafter, she turned her focus toward prose writing.

As suggested by the title, many of the poems are addressed to a lamp, through which she conveys introspective depth, emotional nuance, contemplation, and motivation. The original edition comprised a fusion of painting and poetry, with the poems rendered upon subtle watercolor backgrounds.

== Background ==
Deepshikha was completed in 1939 but its publication was delayed until 1942 due to disruptions in the publishing industry caused by World War II. The initial editions featured an integration of painting and poetry, with the poems set against delicate watercolor backgrounds in the style of the Bengal School of Art and the text rendered in Varma’s own handwriting.

Preceding the poems, the volume includes a substantial introduction along with reflective prose passages on various concepts such as the relative and the absolute in the perception of truth and art, the shifting forms of truth in human relationships, and the portrayal of women in progressive literature. The book comprises 51 lyric poems on various subjects characteristic of the Chhayavad literary movement. In the first edition, each illustrated leaf was counted as a single page, while the accompanying prose section, spanning 24 pages, followed conventional pagination.

== Themes ==
The imagery of the lamp, along with the motif of a waiting woman holding a lamp, appears recurrently in Mahadevi's poetry—from her debut collection, Nihar (1930), to her final work, Agnirekha (1990), which was published posthumously.

As noted by critics, the sentiments and philosophical undertones conveyed through the lamp motif evolved in Varma's works over time. This symbolic identification of the woman with the lamp reached its culmination in Deepshikha. The poetic voice in the later verses articulates what may be regarded as a new phase of the love-myth in her oeuvre—where love, once directed solely toward an unknown beloved, expands into a form of universal love, and personal sorrow is transformed into a broader empathetic compassion.

== See also ==
- Yāmā
- Hindi literature
- List of Hindi poets
- Ram Ki Shakti Puja
