= 7 RCR (TV series) =

- Also known as: 7 RCR...Projecting India's Future
- Genre: Documentary
- Directed by: Puneet Sharma
- Starring: Chetan Bhagat
- Narrated by: Chetan Bhagat
- Country of origin: India
- Original language: Hindi
- No. of episodes: 15

Production
- Running time: 60 minutes

Original release
- Network: ABP News
- Release: 11 January – 29 March 2014

7 RCR...Projecting India's Future is an Indian television politics-based reality series/documentary series, hosted by Indian author, columnist, and speaker Chetan Bhagat on Hindi news channel ABP News, which premiered on 11 January 2014. This is a show of dramatized biographies of all those who have the mettle to make it to 7, Race Course Road, the Prime Minister's official residence, presented in the most interesting manner. It aims to bring to the audience the never seen before facts of Indian history. The 7 RCR show started immediately after the much critically acclaimed Pradhanmantri hosted by Shekhar Kapur. 7 RCR is a show in lead up to 2014 Indian general election. Raghi Papiya Joshi and Sohan Thakur are casting Directors of the show. It showed 8 possible candidates for PM of India. The series is re-launched post-election with episodes on Narendra Modi's journey to 7RCR on 24 May 2014.

== Cast ==
- Susheel Parashar as Ambalal Khosti, RSS Pracharak
- Navni Parihar as Indira Gandhi
- Mohit Chauhan as Rajiv Gandhi
- Dharmesh Tiwari as Jaswant Singh
- Suzanne Bernert as Sonia Gandhi
- Kartik Soni as Rahul Gandhi
- Sangam Rai as Narendra Modi

== Episodes ==
| No. | Title | Original release date |
|---|---|---|
| 1 | "Story Of Narendra Modi From 1950 To 2001" | January 11, 2014 |
| 2 | "Story Of Narendra Modi in Controversial Years From 2001 To 2013" | January 18, 2014 |
| 3 | "Truth Behind Brand Modi" | January 25, 2014 |
| 4 | "Story Of Rahul Gandhi From 1970 To 2004" | February 1, 2014 |
| 5 | "Story Behind Not Naming Rahul Gandhi As PM Candidate For 2014 General Elections" | February 8, 2014 |
| 6 | "Story Of Arvind Kejriwal's Rise" | February 15, 2014 |
| 7 | "Story Of Arvind Kejriwal – Jan Lokpal Bill To 49 – Day CM Of Delhi" | February 22, 2014 |
| 8 | "Story Of Nitish Kumar – CM Of Bihar" | March 1, 2014 |
| 9 | "Story Of Mayawati" | March 8, 2014 |
| 10 | "Story Of Mulayam Singh Yadav" | March 15, 2014 |
| 11 | "Story Of Jayalalithaa – AIADMK Supremo" | March 22, 2014 |
| 12 | "Story Of Mamata Banerjee – CM Of West Bengal" | March 29, 2014 |
| 13 | "Narendra Modi's Journey From Childhood To 7 RCR" | May 24, 2014 |
| 14 | "Election Journey Of Narendra Modi To 7 RCR" | May 31, 2014 |
| 15 | "Masterplan Of Narendra Modi's NDA Govt." | June 7, 2014 |

== Reception ==
=== Social media ===
The show noticed a huge engagement on social media with the #7RCR trending on Twitter for over 4 days in India on its launch. The hashtag was promoted heavily by ABP News through running contest on Twitter started on 18 January 2014. The lucky winners of the #7RCR contest were given iPad Mini. Following the 7RCR's success, Aaj Tak started a documentary series named Aandolan, which is narrated by Om Puri.

=== Controversies ===
The producer of this series, ABP News, came under controversy over showing Arvind Kejriwal under negative light. Use of language on defining every aspect of his life has been overly negative. Arvind Kejriwal himself tweeted about his surprise over the episode on his life. ABP News itself in under criticism for producing biased news..

On the contrary, ABP News has appealed to Arvind Kejriwal to tell about the 'fictional' part of the show and has mentioned that he will be given space to clarify his stand.

== See also ==
- Pradhanmantri
- Samvidhaan
- Bharatvarsh
