= Mahadevi Varma =

Indian writer and poet (1907–1987)

Mahadevi Varma PB PV
- Mahadevi Varma
- Born: 26 March 1907; Farrukhabad, United Provinces of Agra and Oudh, British India
- Died: 11 September 1987 (aged 80); Allahabad, Uttar Pradesh, India
- Education: Allahabad University
- Occupations: Poet, essayist, short story writer
- Spouse: Vikas Narayan Singh
- Writing career
- Years active: 1930–1987
- Notable works: Yāmā; Deepshikha; Shrinkhala ki Kadiyan; Mera Parivar
- Notable awards: 1956 Padma Bhushan; 1982 Jnanpith Award; 1988 Padma Vibhushan
- Movement: Chhayavaad

Signature
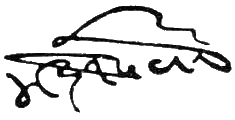

Mahadevi Varma (26 March 1907 – 11 September 1987) was an Indian Hindi-language poet, essayist, and short-story writer. She is regarded as one of the four major pillars of the Chhayavaad movement in Hindi literature.

Between 1930 and 1988, Varma published eight collections of poetry along with several works of prose, including essays and speeches. Her writings reflect experiences from both pre- and post-Partition India, as well as her involvement in social reform, particularly in support of the women's liberation movement.

Literary critics have referred to her as the "modern Meera". The poet Suryakant Tripathi 'Nirala' described her as "Sarasvati in the vast temple of Hindi literature."

Varma developed a softer poetic diction in Khari Boli Hindi, which had previously been associated mainly with Braj Bhasha. She was also trained in music, and her compositions are noted for their expressive language and stylistic refinement.

She is considered one of the most influential female writers of the twentieth century. Her birth centenary was celebrated in 2007, and in 2018, Google honoured her with a Google Doodle.

== Life and education ==
=== Early life ===
Mahadevi Varma was born on 26 March 1907, to a Hindu Chitraguptavanshi Kayastha family from Farrukhabad in Uttar Pradesh. Her father, Govind Prasad Varma, was a college professor in Bhagalpur. Her mother, Hem Rani Devi, was a vegetarian and a religious woman with a keen interest in music. Varma's mother spent hours reciting the Ramayana, Gita, and Vinay Patrika. Her father was a scholar, music lover, atheist, and hunting enthusiast. Poets Suryakant Tripathi and Sumitranandan Pant were close friends of Mahadevi Varma. It is said that Varma tied a rakhi to Tripathi for 40 years.

=== Education ===
Varma was originally admitted to a convent school, but upon her insistence and objection, she was admitted to Crosthwaite Girls' College in Prayagraj (then Allahabad). According to Varma, she learned the strength of unity while staying in the hostel at Crosthwaite, where students of different religions lived together. At first, she started to write poems discreetly. However, it was her roommate and senior, Subhadra Kumari Chauhan (known in the school for writing poems), who discovered her hidden stash of poems.

While others used to play outside, me and Subhadra used to sit on a tree and let our creative thoughts flow together... She used to write in Khariboli, and soon I also started to write in Khariboli... this way, we used to write one or two poems a day...

— Mahadevi Verma Smrti Chitra (Memory Sketch)

She and Subhadra sent poems to various publications, including weekly magazines, and managed to get some of their poems published. The budding poets also attended Kavi Sammelan (poetry seminars), where they met eminent Hindi poets and read their poems to the audience. This partnership continued until Subhadra graduated from Crosthwaite.

In her childhood biography, Mere Bachpan Ke Din (My Childhood Days), Varma wrote that she was very fortunate to be born into a liberal family, especially at a time when girls were considered a burden to their families. Her grandfather reportedly had the ambition of making her a scholar, although he insisted that she follow tradition and marry at the age of nine. Her mother was fluent in both Sanskrit and Hindi and was strongly committed to her faith. Varma credits her mother for inspiring her to write poems and take an interest in literature.

Married in childhood, Varma was expected to live with her husband after graduating in 1929, but she refused as she found his hunting and meat-eating habits offensive. Her remorseful father offered to convert along with her if she wanted to divorce and remarry (since Hindus could not legally divorce at the time), but she declined, insisting she wanted to remain single. She even tried, unsuccessfully, to convince her husband to remarry. Later, she reportedly considered becoming a Buddhist nun but decided against it, though she studied Buddhist Pali and Prakrit texts for her master's degree.

== Professional career ==
She started her career as a teacher and went on to become the principal of Prayag Mahila Vidyapeeth. Although she was married in her childhood, Varma chose to live independently and did not live with her husband, a decision that influenced both her personal life and her literary career. She was also a painter and translator. She went on to receive several of the highest literary awards in Hindi literature.

=== Literary ===
Nihar was her debut collection of poems. She composed Nihar in 1930, Rashmi in 1932, and Neerja in 1933. In 1936, a collection of her poems titled Sandhya Geet was published. In 1939, four poetry collections were published with their respective artworks under the title Yāmā. Apart from these, she also wrote memoirs and essays, with Mera Parivar (My Family), Smriti ki Rekhaye (Sketches from memory), Path ke Sathi (Path's Companions), Shrinkhala ki Kariyan (Series of Links), and Ateet ke Chalchitra (Scenes from Past) being prominent among them.

=== Women's advocacy ===
Mahadevi Varma (on right) receiving the Jnanpith Award from then British Prime Minister Margaret Thatcher in 1982

Varma is also considered among the pioneers of feminism in India. Throughout her career, Varma's work in writing, editing, and teaching significantly advanced the development of Prayag Mahila Vidyapeeth College in Allahabad. This level of responsibility was considered a significant step in the field of women's education at the time. She also worked as a school principal. In 1923, she took over Chand, the leading women's magazine. In 1955, Varma established the Literary Parliament in Allahabad with the help of Ilachandra Joshi and eventually took up the editorship of its publication. This laid the foundation for women poets' conferences in India. Mahadevi was greatly influenced by Buddhism. Under the influence of Mahatma Gandhi, she took up public service and worked in Jhansi in support of the Indian struggle for freedom.

In 1937, Mahadevi Varma built a house in the village of Umagarh, Ramgarh, Uttarakhand, 25 km from Nainital. She named it Meera Temple. She started working for the people of the village and their education. She dedicated herself to women's education and their economic self-sufficiency. Today, this bungalow is known as the Mahadevi Sahitya Museum. She advocated for women's education and economic self-sufficiency.

Her strong condemnation of social stereotypes earned her recognition as a women's rights advocate. She had also been called a social reformer due to her development work and public service towards women and their education. Throughout her creations, there are no visions of pain or anguish anywhere, but the indomitable creative fury reflected in the society's desire for change and an innate attachment towards development.

In her essay Stree Ka Patnitva (“The Wifehood of Hindu Women”), Varma compared traditional marriage structures to forms of social subjugation. She writes that, without affiliation to any political or financial authority, women are relegated to roles as wives and mothers. Her feminism is often overshadowed by her poetic persona. Through poems like Cha, she explores themes and ideas of female sexuality. In her short story, Biblia, she addresses the subject of women's physical and mental abuse.

She spent most of her life in Allahabad (now Prayagraj), Uttar Pradesh, where she died on 11 September 1987.

== Works ==
Varma was a poet as well as a distinguished prose and story writer. Her works are listed below:

=== Poetry ===
- Nihar (1930)
- Rashmi (1932)
- Neerja (1933)
- Sandhyageet (1935)
- Deepshikha (1942)
- Pratham Ayam (1949)
- Saptaparna (1959)
- Agni Rekha (1988)

Several other poetic collections of Mahadevi Varma have also been published, in which selected songs from the above compositions have been compiled.

=== Prose ===
List of selected prose works includes

- Shrinkhala ki Kadiyan (1942)
- Smriti ki Rekhaye (1943)
- Sansmaran (1943)
- Sambhasan (1949)
- Path ke Sathi (1956)
- Skandha (1956)
- Ateet Ke Chalchitra (1961)
- Mera Parivar (1972)
- Vivechamanak Gadya (1972)
- Himalaya (1973)
- Meera Aur Meera (1975): A collection of speeches on Meerabai.

=== Others ===
Two compilations of children's poems of Mahadevi Varma are

- Thakurji Bhole Hai
- Aaj Kharidenge hum Jwala

== Critical analysis ==
Mahadevi Varma's poetry has often been interpreted as deeply personal, especially in its exploration of emotional themes such as pain, longing, compassion, and spiritual yearning.

The moralist Ramchandra Shukla expressed skepticism about the reality of her poetic anguish. He noted

Concerning this anguish, she has revealed such sensations of the heart which are extraterrestrial. As for how real these sensations are, nothing definite can be said.
(English translation)

In contrast, Hazari Prasad Dwivedi viewed Varma's poetry as a collective reflection of human emotion. He argued that her poetic expression of pain was not confined to individual sorrow but symbolized universal human experiences.

Poems such as Deep (from Nihar), Madhur Madhur Mere Deepak Jal (from Neerja), and Mome Sa Tan Gal Hai are frequently cited as representative of Varma's introspective and reflective tone. These works, while sometimes seen as self-centered, also align with the aesthetic and thematic concerns of the Chhayavaad (Shadowism) literary movement.

Literary scholar Satya Prakash Mishra offered a philosophical reading of Varma's role in redefining Chhayavaad:

Mahadevi not only distanced herself from the earlier mystical and object-centered constructs of Chhayavaad, but also reshaped it through humanistic rationalism. Her poetry marked a shift in sensation and expression, focusing not on mere sentiment or devotion, but on the character, essence, and evolution of Chhayavaad itself.
(English translation)

American novelist and translator David Rubin praised her distinctive poetic voice and technical finesse:

What arrests us in Mahadevi's work is the striking originality of the voice and the technical ingenuity that enabled her to create, through a series of mostly short lyrics across five volumes, a consistently evolving representation of total subjectivity measured against the vastness of cosmic nature. There is little direct human interaction—only metaphorical acts like weeping, walking the road, or playing the Veena.

Writer and critic Prabhakar Shrotriya rejected the notion that Mahadevi Varma should be seen solely as a poet of sorrow and despair. He wrote:

In fact, the core of Mahadevi's creative force is not tears but fire. What appears on the surface is not the ultimate truth; the invisible realm is the true source of her inspiration. Her tears are not of ordinary sadness, but the result of internal storms—of thunder, rebellion, and fierce inner flame.
(English translation)

In the scholarly paper Ethical Literary Criticism of the Pain Emotion in Mahadevi Varma's Poetry, researcher Li Yalan examined how critics have interpreted Varma's recurrent focus on suffering. While acknowledging the spiritual and metaphysical tone of her poetry, Li noted that many critics view her portrayal of pain as more symbolic or lyrical than literal. Some also argue that her melancholic tone feels somewhat anachronistic or disconnected from the historical realities of her time.

Despite these debates, Mahadevi Varma remained deeply engaged with the social and political issues of her time. During the Bengal famine of 1943, she published a poetry collection that included the piece Banga Bhu Shanth Vandana. Similarly, in response to the Sino-Indian War, she edited a patriotic poetry collection titled Himalaya.

== Honors and awards ==
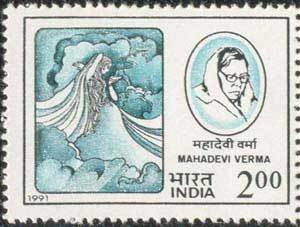
Honorary postal stamp released in 1991

- 1956: Padma Bhushan
- 1979: Sahitya Akademi Fellowship
- 1982: Jnanpith Award for her poetry collection Yāmā.
- 1988: Padma Vibhushan

In 1979, the Indian filmmaker Mrinal Sen produced a Bengali film on her memoir Woh Chini Bhai (The Chinese Brothers), titled Neel Akasher Neechey. On 14 September 1991, the Postal Department of the Government of India issued a double stamp of ₹2 honoring her and Jaishankar Prasad.

== Literary contributions ==
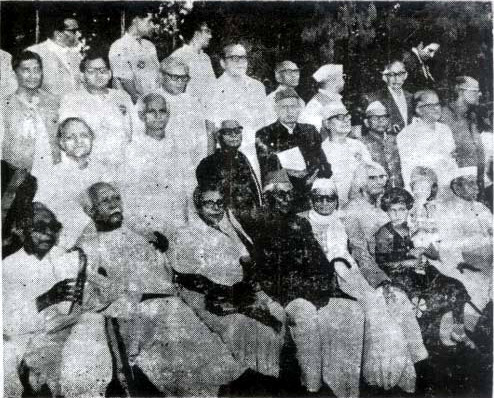
Mahadevi Varma (bottom row, third from left), along with Hazari Prasad Dwivedi and others

The emergence of Mahadevi Varma in literature happened at a time when the shape of Khadi Boli was being refined. She introduced Braj bhasha softness to Hindi poetry and developed a repertoire of songs reflecting her heartfelt acceptance of Indian philosophy. She became an influential figure in language, literature, and philosophy, all of which later influenced an entire generation. Varma created a unique rhythm and simplicity within the composition and language of her songs, as well as the natural use of symbols and images that draw a picture in the mind of the reader. Her contribution to the prosperity of Chhayavadi poetry is significant; while Jaishankar Prasad gave naturalization to the Chhayavadi poetry, Suryakant Tripathi Nirālā embodied the liberation in it, and Sumitranandan Pant brought the art of delicateness; Varma embodied life in the Chhayavadi poetry. The most prominent features of her poetry are emotionalism and intensity of feeling. Such a lively and tangible manifestation of the subtle expressions of the heart makes Varma among the best Chhayavadi poets. She is remembered with respect for her speeches in Hindi. Her speeches were full of compassion for the common man and firm in the truth. At the 3rd World Hindi Conference held in Delhi in 1983, she was the chief guest of the closing ceremony.

Apart from her original creations, she was also a bilingual translator, with works such as her translation of Saptaparna (1980). With the help of her cultural consciousness, she presented 39 pieces of Hindi poetry in her work by establishing the identity of Vedas, Ramayana, Theragatha, and the works of Ashwaghosh, Kalidas, Bhavabhuti, and Jayadeva. The 61-page Apna Baat, discusses the heritage of Indian wisdom and literature, addressing the overall understanding, and fine writing of Hindi, but not limited to female writing.

== Works in English translation ==
Many of Mahadevi Varma’s works—particularly her prose writings—have been translated into English, both in full volumes as well as anthologies.

=== Prose translations ===
- A Pilgrimage to the Himalayas and Other Silhouettes from Memory (1975), translation of Smriti ki Rekhayen by Radhika Prasad Srivastava and Lillian Srivastava. This work was included in the Indian series of UNESCO Collection of Representative Works.
- Sketches from My Past: Encounters with India’s Oppressed (1994), selections from Ateet ke Chalchitra, translated by Neera Kuckreja Sohoni, published by Northeastern University Press.
- Links in the Chain (2003), translation of Shrinkhala ki Kadiyan by Neera Kuckreja Sohoni, a collection of Varma’s essays on Indian women.
- Political Essays on Women, Culture, and Nation (2010), edited by Anita Anantharam (Cambria Press), comprises major political essays and selected poems, translated by Francesca Orsini and Vasudha Dalmia, among others.
- My Family (2021), translation of Mera Parivar by Ruth Vanita, published by Penguin India.
- Portraits from Memory (2025) by Ruth Vanita, published by Harper Perennial India, an imprint of Harper-Collins India, brings together Smriti ki Rekhaye and Ateet ke Chalchitra in a single memoir volume.

=== Poetry translations ===
Translations of Mahadevi Varma’s poetry have appeared in a few editions. Selected Poems: Mahadevi Varma (1987), translated by L.S. Sinha, was among the earliest stand-alone English editions of her poems. David Rubin included substantial selections of her work in The Return of Sarasvati: Four Hindi Poets (1998) and in Of Love and War: A Chhayavad Anthology (2005). Beyond these, a few poems have been translated into various journals. Notable appearances include The Illustrated Weekly of India, Hindi Review (the English organ of the Nagari Pracharini Sabha), Indian Literature published by the Sahitya Akademi, and Modern Indian Literature: An Anthology edited by K.M. George.

== See also ==
- Chhayavaad
- Jaishankar Prasad
- Suryakant Tripathi 'Nirālā'
- Sumitranandan Pant
