= Kumar Vishwas =

Indian poet and a lecturer

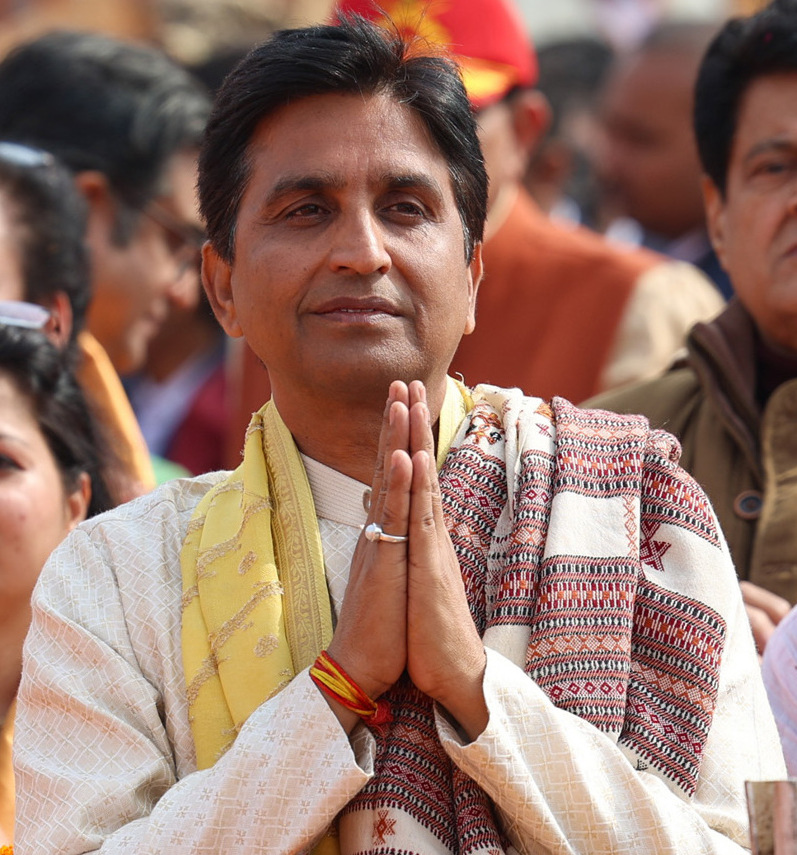
- Born: Vishwas Kumar Sharma; 10 February 1970 (age 56); Pilkhuwa, Uttar Pradesh, India
- Occupations: Poet; Politician; Lecturer
- Children: 2
- Writing career
- Notable works: Ek Pagli Ladki Ke Bin (1996); Koi Deewana Kehta Hai (2007); Hothon Par Ganga Ho (2016); Phir Meri Yaad (2019)

Kumar Vishwas (born Vishwas Kumar Sharma; 10 February 1970) is an Indian Hindi poet, a lecturer and former politician. He was one of the founding members of the Aam Aadmi Party (AAP) and a former member of its National Executive.

== Life and career ==
Vishwas was born on 10 February 1970 in a middle-class family in the town of Pilkhuwa in Uttar Pradesh, where he studied at Lala Ganga Sahay School. His father, Chandra Pal Sharma, was a lecturer at R.S.S. Degree College in Pilkhuwa and his mother, Rama Sharma, was a homemaker. Vishwas is the youngest child and has four brothers and a sister. He studied at the Rajputana Regiment Inter College and then joined Motilal Nehru Regional Engineering College because his father wanted him to become an engineer. However, engineering did not interest Vishwas and he left it to study Hindi literature, in which he subsequently earned a PhD.

It was while studying for his PhD that Vishwas changed his name from Vishwas Kumar Sharma to Kumar Vishwas, to maintain a poetic identity. In 1994, he became a lecturer in Indra Gandhi PG College 'Pilibanga' Rajasthan, then taught Hindi literature at Lala Lajpat Rai College. In 2012, he joined the newly formed AAP as a volunteer worker.

Vishwas hosts a comedy show called KV Sammelan on the Aaj Tak television channel that first premiered on 29 September 2018.

Vishwas routinely gives performances in which he demonstrates his poetry and love for Hindi, Urdu and Sanskrit literature. He incorporates his comments on topical issues relating to India. He has participated in poetry recitations and functions abroad including the US, UK, Dubai, Oman, Singapore and Japan.

== Political career ==
Vishwas has known Arvind Kejriwal since 2005 and joined the India Against Corruption movement led by Anna Hazare. Thereafter, as the movement faded and morphed into what is today known as the AAP, led by Kejriwal, he was asked to become a member of its national executive.

He contested the 2014 Lok Sabha election as an AAP candidate from Amethi, but lost to then incumbent Rahul Gandhi, securing only 25,527 votes.

A sting operation was carried out by a tabloid media portal called "Media Sarkar" ahead of the 2013 Delhi Assembly elections that claimed that some AAP members, including Vishwas and Shazia Ilmi, had raised illegal cash donations. The AAP accused the portal of slandering the leaders of the party. Mediasarkar.com and AAP filed cross complaints against each other. The police promised action after a thorough investigation.

As elections approached, a doctored video clip from a Kavi sammelan went viral in which he was shown making alleged derogatory remarks about Imam Hussain and Hindu deities and nurses from Kerala. As a result, various cases were registered against him. Vishwas responded that the clippings were doctored and later apologised for his remarks, saying it was not his intention to hurt anyone's sentiments or feelings.

In 2016, Vishwas was accused by a campaign volunteer of molestation and making "sexually coloured" remarks. The courts ordered a FIR to be registered because of the complaint but an investigation by Delhi Police found no significant evidence to substantiate it.

In July 2017, Vishwas was accused of copyright infringement by Amitabh Bachchan in relation to a posting on YouTube of a poem by his father Harivansh Rai Bachchan. The video was taken down and a compensation of ₹32 was paid. This was around the same time that he was embroiled in a dispute within the AAP, which he had threatened to quit.

On 23 March 2019, Vishwas was served with a legal notice by Amritsar based advocate, NPS Hira, for allegedly cracking jokes on the Sikh community in a demeaning manner in a programme organised at NIT ground Faridabad on 15 March 2019. Hira also warned Vishwas of criminal complaint if he fails to visit Sri Akal Takht Sahib and apologise.

On 16 February 2022 just before 2022 Punjab Legislative Elections, Vishwas claimed that the AAP Supremo Kejriwal once said him that even if he loses the election, he will become the first prime minister of an independent Khalistan by taking the help of separatists. Kejriwal termed these claims as politically motivated and a "big joke" as had he been a terrorist why had not he been probed since so many years in electoral politics. Delhi High Court called a petition related to this matter "frivolous". AAP MLAs offered "laddoos" to Vishwas in the wake of their Punjab victory.

== Media ==
Vishwas has been a guest judge on the Indian Idol television show and a guest on Zee TV's talent hunt show Sa Re Ga Ma Pa Li'l Champs. He wrote the songs "De De Jagah" for the 2018 Hindi film Parmanu: The Story of Pokhran and "Veer Bhagat Singh". Vishwas was a guest on 1 July 2017 episode of The Kapil Sharma Show along with Rahat Indori and Shabinaji. He was a guest again on 21 September 2019 episode of The Kapil Sharma Show along with Manoj Bajpai and Pankaj Tripathi.

He also presented Tarpan, a musical poetry series, where he would recite poems of famous historical poets, against a background of music.

Kumar Vishwas will be seen as judge, evaluating performances of the contestants on parameters of sur, bhaav and saar in upcoming spiritual musical reality show Swarna Swar Bharat on Zee TV, Zee Anmol and Zee5.

== Personal life ==
He is married to Manju Sharma, with whom he has two daughters.

== Notable works ==
- Ek Pagli Ladki Ke Bin (1996)
- Koi Deewana Kehta Hai (2007)
- Phir Meri Yaad (2017)
- Hai Naman Unko
- Apne Apne Ram

== Filmography ==
- Mission Raniganj (2023) - as a lyricist
- Ramayana: Part 1 (2026) - as a lyricist
