= Bhargavi (disambiguation) =

Bhargavi is an epithet of the goddess Lakshmi in Hinduism.

== People ==
- Bhargavi (actress) (1983–2008), Telugu actress
- Bhargavi Chirmule (born 1978), Marathi actress
- Bhargavi Davar, Indian activist
- Bhargavi Rao (1944–2008), Telugu writer and translator
- Manju Bhargavi (born 1955), Telugu actress and dancer
- Sravana Bhargavi (born 1989), Telugu playback singer

== Other uses ==
- Bhargavi River, Orissa, India
- S. P. Bhargavi, a 1991 Kannada action film

== See also ==
- Bhargava, a dynasty in Hinduism founded by the sage Bhrgu
- Bhargava (name), masculine form of the given name
