= Fasana-e-Azad =

Urdu novel in four parts by Ratan Nath Dhar Sarshar

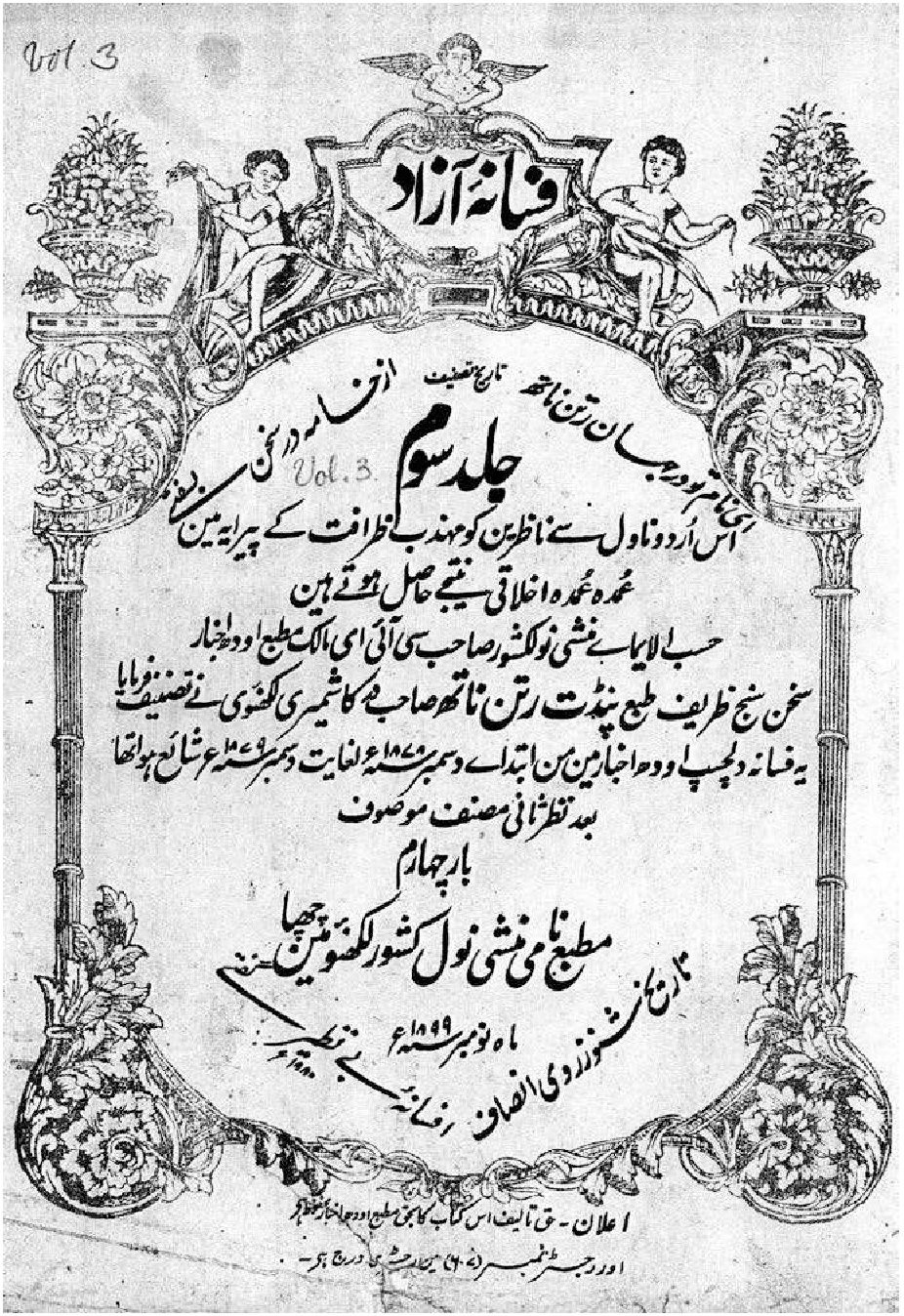
- Title page of Fasana-e-Azad Vol. 3, 4th ed. (1899), published by Nawal Kishore Press
- Author: Ratan Nath Dhar Sarshar
- Original title: فسانۂ آزاد
- Language: Urdu
- Genre: Picaresque novel
- Set in: Lucknow and an imaginary Middle East during the late 19th century
- Publisher: Nawal Kishore Press
- Publication date: Volume 1: 1881; Volume 2: 1882; Volume 3: 1883; Volume 4: 1883
- Publication place: British India
- Dewey Decimal: 891.4393

Fasana-e-Azad (Urdu: فسانۂ آزاد; transl. The Adventures of Azad, also romanized as Fasana-i-Azad) is an Urdu novel by Ratan Nath Dhar Sarshar. It was serialized in Avadh Akhbar between 1878 and 1883 before it was published in four large volumes by the Nawal Kishore Press. The story follows a wandering character named Azad and his companion, Khoji, from the streets of late-nineteenth-century Lucknow to the battlefields of the Russo-Turkish War (1877–1878) in Constantinople and Russia. The work's status as a novel has been debated, but it is thought by most scholars to be one of the first novels (or a proto-novel) in Urdu.

Sarshar conceived of writing Fasana-e-Azad after the success of the articles he contributed to Avadh Akhbar under the title "Zarafat" ("Wit and Humour"). Perennially popular, Fasana-e-Azad has been a subject of study by literary critics as the first Urdu novel and for its influence on the literary form's later development. It is noted for its colourful descriptions of Lucknow, its people, and its culture.

== Background ==
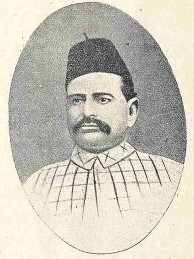
Ratan Nath Dhar Sarshar (1846 or 1847 – 1903)

Sarshar, a teacher in Kheri District of Uttar Pradesh, joined the Nawal Kishore Press (founded by Munshi Nawal Kishore) in Lucknow as an editor of Avadh Akhbar. He wrote a column for the magazine about Lucknow's feudal culture, which inspired him to write Fasana-e-Azad.

On 8 August 1878, Sarshar was appointed editor of Avadh Akhbar. His first entry in a series called "Zarafat" was published in the 13 August 1878 issue, and the column appeared regularly thereafter. These columns, which eventually made up the first 500 pages of the book, satirize urban life, usually centering on a wandering figure such as Azad or a minor character. This was in keeping with the influence of Charles Dickens's The Pickwick Papers and Miguel de Cervantes' Don Quixote on Sarshar. The popularity of Zarafat led Sarsharr to continue the stories and develop the entries into a narrative called Fasana-e-Azad.

In one piece, published on 23 September, Sarshar explained his reasons for writing the series. He said that his intention was to use humour to allow Avadh Akhbar's readers to familiarize themselves with a social culture, characterized by proper conversational style and idiomatic fluency suited to a variety of social occasions, which could be used in a variety of social gatherings. Sarshar believed that such an education would improve the country and its people; pleasure in reading humorous articles would encourage refinement and higher thought. (Note: This is an English paraphrase of the original statement in Urdu: اس سے اصلی مقصد ہمارا یہ ہے ناظرین اودھ اخبار بہ پیرایۂ ظرافت تعلیم مذاق و بول چال اور موقع مناسب کے محاورات اور ہر قسم کی صحبتوں کی کیفیت و طرز معاشرت کلیہ واقفیت تامہ حاصل کریں ..... کہ مجامع انسان کی جو حالتیں ہیں اور جس قدر اثر صحبت زمانہ کا ہے اس سے ہمارے ملک کو فائدہ عظیم پہنچے تاکہ نیک خیالات اخلاق حسنہ سے لوگوں کے دل منور اور خیالات فاسدہ اور خصائل رزیلہ کی تاریکی سے پاک ہوں اور ٰٰکامل فیض ایک معقول تربیت سے راستی پسند طبیعیتوں کو ہو۔ ان کو پڑھ کر بلحاظ زباندانی اور بخیال عمدہ مقاصد لطف و مذاق زندہ دلی حاصل کریں۔)

== Characters ==
Fasana-e-Azad's main characters are:

- Azad – the protagonist. He wanders around Lucknow, meets people from all classes with a variety of ideas, and attends the festivals of Eid, Shab Barart, and Basant and the mourning rituals of Maharram.
- Husn Ara – a beautiful girl, from an aristocratic family, whom Azad loves
- Sihpahr Ara – Husn Ara's younger sister
- Khoji – a dwarf who is Azad's companion

== Plot ==
The novel is set in Lucknow and an imaginary Middle East during the late 19th century. Its theme follows the pattern of Miguel de Cervantes' Don Quixote, with Azad modeled on Don Quixote. Azad's faithful friend, Khoji, echoes Sancho Panza.

Azad, with no family history, wanders around the city; he encounters all kinds of people and observes Lucknow's changing urban milieu. He has a keen eye for female beauty. Azad meets two sisters and falls in love with Husna Ara, the older sister. Although she loves him too, she sets a condition for their marriage: Azad must go to Turkey and fight with the Turks in their war with the Russians. Azad leaves for Turkey with Khoji, his sidekick, a dwarf with a fondness for opium and delusions about his handsomeness and martial prowess. They have a number of adventures in Turkey and Russia; several noblewomen fall in love with Azad, who remains more-or-less true to Husn Ara.

Azad, Khoji, and two female European admirers return to India in triumph. Azad marries Husna Ara, and the two European women become social workers. He becomes the father of twins and is well-known and respected, devoting a great deal of time to the propagation of new ideas, education, commerce and industry. When war breaks out against Afghanistan, Azad is asked by the government to aid the war effort. He goes to war, again proving himself a valiant soldier. Azad then returns home and lives a happy, useful life devoted to the advancement of his country. Fasana-e-Azad has a number of sub-plots, including the story of Husna Ara's sister, Sipahr Ara; her lover, prince Humayun Far; and the Shahsawar, his mysterious rival.

== Publication history ==
Fasana-e-Azad consists of four volumes, with a total of about 3,000 pages (roughly 2.25 million words). The novel has been published in a number of formats. Volume One was serialized in Avadh Akhbar from August 1878 to 5 January 1880 under the title, "Zarafat". It was published in book form in January 1881 by the Nawal Kishore Press, which also published the remaining three volumes. The first instalment of Volume Two appeared in the magazine on 1 July 1880, when the title Fasana-e-Azad was first used. Further instalments, sold by subscription and separately priced, were published after 30 July as monthly supplements to Avadh Akhbar. It was published in book form in July 1882. The third volume was serialized monthly from February 1882 to January 1883 and was published in book form, with an initial print run of 200 copies and a cost of three rupees, in June 1883. Although it is unknown if the final volume was serialized, it was published in book form in 1883.

=== Later editions ===
A chapter of Fasana-e-Azad, over 15 pages long, was published by Nawal Kishore Press in 1906 as "Range Siyar". A new edition of the novel was published in 1934. Saraswati Press of Banaras published an abridged 550-page Hindi edition in 1947. The character of Khoji became so popular that Muhammad Ahsan Farooqi collected excerpts about Khoji from the novel and compiled them into a book entitled Khoji, which was published in 1952 by Raja Ram Kumar Press (a successor of Nawal Kishore Press). The New Delhi-based Jamia Book Department published an abridged edition, Fasana-e-Azad (Talkhis), in 1970.

== Reception ==
Fasana-e-Azad was the first serialized Urdu fiction published in an Urdu newspaper. A landmark of modern Urdu fiction, it sparked unprecedented public interest and helped Avadh Akhbar solidify its reputation as one of South Asia's first commercially viable Urdu dailies. During and after publication of the novel, Sarshar became one of the Urdu community's most popular figures.

The novel is regarded as one of the first modern Urdu novels, or an immediate precursor to the novel form. According to Firoz Hissain, Fasana-e-Azad's success was unprecedented in the history of Urdu literature; it was read and enjoyed by every segment of society. The novel has been described as an encyclopedia of contemporary Lucknow culture.

Reviewers praised Fasana-e-Azad for its portrayals of Lucknow's marketplaces, fairs and diverse social classes, presented with a liveliness and accuracy considered unprecedented in Urdu literature. Historian Ram Babu Saksena cites the novel's realistic depiction of Lucknow's life, the "faithful and vivid portrayal of life and manners of Lucknow society" and Sarshar's "brilliants humour" as outstanding features of Fasana-e-Azad. Saksena calls Sarshar's humour "full-blooded, healthy and unrestrained", and none of his contemporaries approach his "fund of humour".

Shaista Suhrawardy Ikramullah calls Khoji Sarshar's greatest achievement and an immortal character in Urdu fiction. Saksena describes Khoji as a "unique character in the whole range of Urdu literature" and as "the most original and wonderful creation of humorous art".

Rauf Parekh included it among the "10 best urdu novels", praising the novel's depiction of Lucknow culture and its use of chaste Urdu.

== Adaptation ==
Wah Janaab, a television series based on Fasana-e-Azad, aired on DD National in 1984.

== Status as a novel ==
Study of Fasana-e-Azad began after Sarshar's death with the publication of articles by Brij Narayan Chakbast and Bishan Narayan Dar, two of his contemporaries. Much scholarship has focused on its relationship to the history of the novel. Asaduddin describes the general consensus that "Critics and writers call Fasana-e Azad a novel but with some reservations."

Sarshar himself was the first to call Fasana-e-Azad a novel, in 1879. Ralph Russell calls it "a work which brought permanently into Urdu literature some of the major elements of the modern novel." Vaqār ʿAz̤īm's textbook on Urdu prose describes it as important in the history of the novel, saying it has had "a profound impact on our novels' development, for which all future novelists owe Sarshar a debt of gratitude." Dubrow argues that inconsistencies the work's plot and characterization are actually common features of serialized works, which Sarshar intentionally improved to be more novelistic when he revised his columns for book publication. Mohammad Asaduddin highlights the way that Sarshar depicts ordinary life with unembellished language as an important novelistic trait. He also highlights the lack of supernatural elements which would have aligned Fasana-e-Azad more strongly with the genre of dāstān or romance.

Ultimately, however, Asaduddin concludes that Fasana-e-Azad is not a "novel proper" because its plot is too unfocused and its characters too unrealistic. Plot and characters, and especially their failure to conform to Victorian standards of literary realism, are common grounds for the assessment that Fasana-e-Azad is not quite a novel. Muhammad Ahsan Farooqi attributed the many uncohesive subplots to Sarshar's "carelessness": "Sarshar had no plan and stuffed in any story wherever he wanted and ended it whenever the mood struck." According to Farooqi, the love between Azad and Husn Ara is the only thread running through the work from beginning to end. Bishan Narayan Dar wrote, "Fasana-e-Azad is not a proper novel, since its plot was not conceived according to any plan. It has neither beginning, nor middle, nor end; rather, it is a collection of unconnected snapshots of the society and culture in which Sarshar lived." Chakbast questioned how Azad's character (which he described as a "uncontrollable, carefree, itinerant, and sometimes even sinful man") could abruptly become "so chaste and refined," finding the character's development "against the law of nature." Author Shaista Suhrawardy Ikramullah also called the characters' development inconsistent.

== See also ==
- Hamzanama, Indian folktale, considered an influence on the novel

== Sources ==
- Asaduddin, Mohammad (2001). "First Urdu Novel: Contesting Claims and Disclaimers". The Annual of Urdu Studies. hdl:1793/18219.
- Dubrow, Jennifer (2011). From newspaper sketch to "novel": The writing and reception of "Fasana-e Azad" in North India, 1878–1880 (PhD thesis). Departments of South Asian Languages and Civilizations, University of Chicago – via ProQuest.
- Dubrow, Jennifer (2016). "A Space for Debate: Fashioning the Urdu Novel in Colonial India". Comparative Literature Studies. 53 (2): 296. doi:10.5325/complitstudies.53.2.0289 – via Project MUSE.
- Dubrow, Jennifer (2017). "Serial fictions: Urdu print culture and the novel in colonial South Asia". The Indian Economic & Social History Review. 54 (4): 408. doi:10.1177/0019464617728224. S2CID 149068497 – via SAGE Publishing.
- Dubrow, Jennifer (October 2018). "The Novel in Installments: Fasana-e Azad and Literary Modernity". Cosmopolitan Dreams: The Making of Modern Urdu Literary Culture in Colonial South Asia. University of Hawaii Press. pp. 35–36. doi:10.1515/9780824876692. ISBN 978-0-8248-7270-0. S2CID 239947236 – via De Gruyter.
- George, K. M., ed. (1997). Masterpieces of Indian literature. Vol. 2. New Delhi: National Book Trust. pp. 1518–1520. ISBN 978-81-237-1978-8.
- Husain, Firoz (1964). Life and works of Ratan Nath Sarshar (PhD thesis). SOAS University of London. OCLC 46438440.
- Ikramullah, Shaista Suhrawardy (1945). "Chapter IV: Pandit Ratan Nath Sarshār: Fasāna e Azād" (PDF). A Critical Survey of the Development of the Urdu Novel and Short Story. London: Longmans, Green and Co. pp. 31–40. OCLC 3920236.
- Jain, Gyan Chand (1988). "Fasana-e-Azad". In Datta, Amaresh (ed.). Encyclopaedia of Indian Literature: Devraj to Jyoti. New Delhi: Sahitya Akademi. pp. 1264–1265. ISBN 978-81-260-1194-0.
- Ministry of Information and Broadcasting Annual Report 1985–86 (Report). 1985.
- Mohammed, Sadiq (1995). A History of Urdu Literature. Delhi: Oxford University Press. p. 417. ISBN 978-0-19-563145-6.
- Oldenburg, Veena Talwar; Sharar, Abdul Halim; Llewellyn-Jones, Rosie (2001). The Lucknow Omnibus. Oxford University Press. p. 201. ISBN 978-0-19-565329-8.
- Saksena, Ram Babu (1990). A History of Urdu Literature. New Delhi: Asian Educational Services. ISBN 9788120606166. OCLC 312754167.
- Stark, Ulrike (2007). "Chapter 6: Avadh Akhbar: Politics, Public Opinion, and the Promotion of Urdu Literature". An Empire of Books: The Naval Kishore Press and the Diffusion of the Printed Word in Colonial India. Ranikhet: Permanent Black. p. 364. ISBN 978-81-7824-196-8.
- Sud, K. N. (July–August 1977). "Urdu Fiction and Krishan Chandar". Indian Literature. 20 (4). New Delhi: Sahitya Akademi: 124. JSTOR 24158701.
- Parekh, Rauf (11 February 2012). "The 10 best Urdu novels...and a runner-up". Dawn (newspaper).
