= Ratan Nath Dhar Sarshar =

Indian writer and newspaper editor (1846/47–1903)

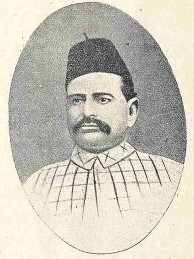
- Born: 1846 or 1847
- Died: 21 January 1903; Hyderabad, British India
- Occupations: novelist, columnist, editor
- Writing career
- Pen name: Sarshar
- Language: Urdu
- Notable work: Fasana-e-Azad

Ratan Nath Dhar Sarshar (Urdu: رتن ناتھ در سرشارؔ; 1846 or 1847 – 21 January 1903) was an Indian Urdu novelist, columnist and editor from British India. Born into a Kashmiri Brahmin family which settled in Lucknow, he received his education at Canning College and later took up employment as a schoolteacher. In August 1878, he was appointed editor of the Lucknow-based newspaper Avadh Akhbar, in which his most famous work Fasana-e-Azad was published serially.

== Biography ==
Sarshar's date of birth is uncertain. Most probably he was born in 1846 or 1847. He was born in a Kashmiri Brahmin (a group well known for their proficiency in Persian and Urdu) family. His father, Pandit Bej Nath Dhar, a trader who immigrated from Kashmir to Lucknow, died when Sarshar was four years old; thereafter Sarshar was brought up by his mother. Sarshar was initially schooled in the traditional way by learning Arabic and Persian at a local maktab (primary school).

Sarshar joined, for his schooling, the Canning College (which later migrated into University of Lucknow), but left without taking a degree. In 1878, he joined Avadh Akhbar as its editor.

In 1895, Sarshar moved to Hyderabad where he was engaged by Maharaja Sir Kishen Pershad to correct and improve upon his prose writings and poetic composition. Sarshar also edited a journal, Dabdaba-e-Asifi.

He died on 21 January 1903 at Hyderabad due to heavy drinking.

== Works ==
The historian Ram Babu Saksena called Sarshar 'a most remarkable figure' in the last decade of nineteenth century.

His serialized novel Fasana-e-Azad (The Tale of Azad), which appeared between 1878 and 1883 as a regular supplement in his paper, was influenced by novels like The Pickwick Papers and Don Quixote, as well as the epic romances (dastan) of Persian and Urdu. Spanning over three thousand pages, the novel narrates the adventures of the protagonist, Azad, through the streets of Lucknow to the battlefields of the Russo-Turkish War (1877–1878). It was first published in 1881 by Nawal Kishore Press. Sarshar gave copyrights for Fasana-e-Azad to Munshi Nawal Kishore of Lucknow who also published Talism Hoshruba. Fasana-e-Azad was translated into Hindi as Azad Katha by Premchand, who also translated Sarshar's Sair-i-Kohsar as Parvat Yatra. A Hindi TV serial Wah Janaab by satirist Sharad Joshi, based on Fasana-e-Azad, ran successfully on the state-run television channel Doordarshan in the 1980s.

His other novels are Sair-i-Kohsar and Jam-i-Sarshar. His novel Gor-i-Ghariban remained unpublished due to his accidental death. His novel Khuda-e-Foujdar is an Urdu translation of Don Quixote.
