= Bhargava (name) =

Bhargava is a surname. Notable persons with that name include:

- Alok Bhargava, Indian econometrician
- Girdhari Lal Bhargava (1936–2009), Indian politician, and member of the Lok Sabha
- Gopi Chand Bhargava (1889–1966), first Chief Minister of Punjab
- H. R. Bhargava, Indian film director
- Kant Kishore Bhargava, Indian diplomat
- Lila Ramkumar Bhargava, Indian freedom fighter, social worker
- Manish Bhargav (born 1994), Indian footballer
- Manjari Bhargava (1956–2024), Indian diver
- Manjul Bhargava, Canadian-American mathematician of Indian origin
- Manoj Bhargava, Indian American businessman and philanthropist
- Pushpa Mittra Bhargava, Indian scientist, writer, and administrator
- Rajeev Bhargava (born 1954), Indian political theorist
- Ranjit Bhargava, Indian environmentalist
- Ravindranath Bhargava, Indian politician from Madhya Pradesh
- R. C. Bhargava (born 1934), chairman of Maruti Suzuki
- Seema Bhargava, Indian film and television actress
- Sharda Bhargava (1912–1999), Indian politician, of Indian National Congress and member of Rajya Sabha
- Sneh Bhargava, Indian radiologist, medical academic
- Vikrant Bhargava, Indian entrepreneur

== See also ==
- Bhargava
