= Biotechnology in India =

Biotechnology industry in India

Biotechnology in India is a sunrise sector within the Indian economy. Agencies of the Government of India concerned with the biotechnology industry include the Department of Biotechnology and the proposed Biotechnology Regulatory Authority of India. As of 2022, the sector is valued at $80 billion. Biotechnology in India is in a growth phase and the sector is expected to be valued at $150 billion by 2025 and surpass $300 billion in value by 2030.

== History ==
The first Indian biotechnology company to be established was Biocon, which was founded by Kiran Mazumdar-Shaw in 1978. The Indian biotechnology industry formally began in 1986 with the establishment of the Department of Biotechnology (DBT) by the Ministry of Science and Technology. 1999 saw the founding of Genome Valley, an Indian high-technology business district spread across 2,000-acre (8.1 km^{2})/(3.1 sq mi) in Hyderabad, Telangana. Also from 1999, St. Joseph’s College, Irinjalakuda, Kerala is offering a government-aided B.Sc. Biotechnology program. It is the only institution in Kerala offering an aided graduation program in biotechnology. In 2024, the Indian government approved the ₹9,197 crore (US$960 million) Bio-RIDE scheme to focus on three areas of biotechnology in India: research and development, entrepreneurship and industrial development, and biomanufacturing and biofoundries, with the goal of growing India's bioeconomy to $300 billion by 2030.

== Regulation ==
=== Department of Biotechnology ===
The Department of Biotechnology is an Indian government department under the Ministry of Science and Technology, responsible for administering development and commercialization in the field of modern biology and biotechnology in India. The DBT was also one of the world's first government departments that was established to focus solely on the biotechnology sector.

=== Biotechnology Regulatory Authority of India ===
The Biotechnology Regulatory Authority of India (BRAI) is a proposed regulatory body in India for uses of biotechnology products including genetically modified organisms (GMOs). The institute was first suggested under the Biotechnology Regulatory Authority of India (BRAI) draft bill prepared by the Department of Biotechnology in 2008. Since then, it has undergone several revisions.

== Companies ==
=== Biologics and biosimilars manufactures ===
Several of the large Indian pharmaceutical companies also manufacture biologics and biosimilars. One of Biocon's subsidiaries, Biocon Biologics, manufactures biosimilars. Intas Pharmaceuticals also manufactures biosimilars. Dr. Reddy's Laboratories entered the biosimilars market in 2008. Cipla entered the biosimilars market in 2010. Aurobindo Pharma is focusing on developing biosimilars in various segments. Enzene Biosciences is the biologics subsidiary of Alkem Laboratories.

Reliance Life Sciences, owned by Mukesh Ambani, Asia's wealthiest man, manufactures biosimilars and other biopharmaceutical and pharmaceutical products.

=== Vaccine manufactures ===
India is the world's largest vaccine maker as of 2020. Indian vaccine manufactures include the Serum Institute of India (SII). SII is the world's largest vaccine manufacturer. Reliance Life Sciences, among other products, also manufactures vaccines. Another established vaccine manufacturer is Bharat Biotech. Hester Biosciences is Asia’s largest company that manufactures animal and poultry vaccines.

=== Contract manufacturers, researchers and developers ===
Syngene International, is a subsidiary of Biocon and is a contact development and manufacturing organisation (CDMO) that, among other areas, offers CDMO services for biologics. Laurus Bio is a subsidiary of Laurus Labs and was originally an independent company named Richcore, before Laurus Labs acquired Richcore and renamed it. Laurus Bio, among other products and services, also offers CDMO services for microbial precision fermentation. In 2021, Cipla entered into a joint venture with biopharmaceutical CDMO company Kemwell Biopharma, to develop, manufacture and commercialize biosimilars for global markets. Concord Biotech, among other areas, offers contract research and manufacturing services for fermentation products.

=== Active pharmaceutical ingredients ===
Concord Biotech manufactures, among other products, fermentation based complex active pharmaceutical ingredients.

=== Bioinformatics ===
Tata Consultancy Services (TCS), one of the largest information technology companies in India, offers bioinformatics and biostatistics services.

=== Other established companies ===
- Advanced Enzymes
- Sea6 Energy is a startup working for producing fuel from seaweed.

=== Startups ===
There have been an increasing number of startups being founded in the Indian biotechnology industry. In 2021, the total number of biotechnology startups stood at 5365, whereas in 2010, there were only 50 startups in the sector. As of 2021, more than half of the biotechnology startups are being founded in the medical sector, however, other large sectors where biotechnology startups are being founded include 18% in the biotechnology services sector and 14% of startups are in agricultural biotechnology.

== Biotechnology parks ==
The DBT has set up biotechnology parks in India, and as of 2022, there are 9 biotechnology parks across the country. The parks have been set up by the DBT to give infrastructure support that will assist in making biotechnology research into products and services. The biotechnology parks give scientists and small and medium-sized enterprises facilities that can help them in developing and demonstrating technologies, and assist in their pilot plant studies as well.
