= Biotechnology Regulatory Authority of India =

The Biotechnology Regulatory Authority of India (BRAI) is a proposed regulatory body in India for uses of biotechnology products including genetically modified organisms (GMOs). The institute was first suggested under the Biotechnology Regulatory Authority of India (BRAI) draft bill prepared by the Department of Biotechnology in 2008. Since then, it has undergone several revisions.

The bill has faced opposition from farmer groups and anti-GMO activists.

== Overview ==
On 23 January 2003, India ratified the Cartagena Protocol which protects biodiversity from potential risks of genetically modified organisms, the products of modern biotechnology. The protocol requires setting up of a regulatory body. Currently, the Genetic Engineering Approvals Committee, a body under the Ministry of Environment and Forests (India) is responsible for approval of genetically engineered products in India. If the bill is passed, the responsibility will be taken over by the Environment Appraisal Panel, a sub-division of the BRAI.

According to the bill, BRAI will have a chairperson, two full-time members and two part-time members; all will be required to have expertise in life sciences and biotechnology in agriculture, health care, environment and general biology. The bill also proposes setting up an inter-ministerial governing body, to oversee the performance of BRAI, and a National Biotechnology Advisory Council of stakeholders to provide feedback on the use of biotechnology products and organisms in the society. The regulatory body will be an autonomous and statutory agency to regulate the research, transport, import, and manufacture biotechnology products and organisms.

== Criticism ==
Suman Sahai, founder of the Gene Campaign, has called the bill flawed. According to her, the bill is proposing new institutes without clearly defining their powers and responsibilities. She has also stated that the bill was introduced without consulting the people who will be affected by the bill.

P. M. Bhargava, founder of the Centre for Cellular and Molecular Biology, has also opposed the bill. He has called the bill unconstitutional, as agricultural policy is the domain of state governments. He pointed out that the bill proposes formation of several subdivisions and has argued that they will consist of bureaucrats with no scientific knowledge. He has accused the Department of Biotechnology, which will be involved in selection of members, as a promoter of genetic technology in India. He has pointed out that the broadly defined term "confidential commercial information" has been kept outside the purview of the Right to Information Act. He had stated that the bill uses vague wordings which would criminalize sequencing or isolation of DNA and PCR techniques, requiring approval for each usage. Thus, hindering research and education. He pointed out the bill has no provision for mandatory labelling of GM foods. He criticized giving the body power to punish parties making false or misleading statements about GM crops, calling it unprecedented.

In September 2010, Jairam Ramesh, then Environment Minister, pointed out that the body is only deals with safety and efficacy of biotechnology products. The issue of commercialization has been left unaddressed. The decisions regarding commercialization can fall under the purview of Ministry of Environment and Forests, Ministry of Health, Ministry of Agriculture, or Department of Science and Technology.

On the other hand, Association of Biotechnology Led Enterprises (ABLE) has supported the bill. J.S. Rehman, an entomologist and a former member of the Review Committee on Genetic Manipulation, has stated that most protesters associate genetic engineering with Monsanto, as a result development of Indian biotech is being hindered.

== See also ==
- Regulation of the release of genetic modified organisms
- Bt brinjal
- Genetically modified food controversies
