= Lila Ramkumar Bhargava =

Indian freedom fighter (early 1920s–2014)

- Born: c. 1921; India
- Died: 25 May 2014; Bengaluru, Karnataka, India
- Occupations: Social worker, freedom fighter
- Spouse: Munshi Ram Kumar Bhargava
- Children: Ranjit Bhargava
- Awards: Padma Shri

Rani Lila Ramkumar Bhargava was an Indian freedom fighter, social worker, educationist and a former leader of the Indian National Congress. She was an associate of Indian prime minister, Indira Gandhi and was married into the family of Munshi Nawal Kishore, the founder of reportedly the oldest printing press in Asia, Nawal Kishore Press, to Munshi Ramkumar Bhargava, a fourth generation member of the family and the holder of the title of Raja from Lord Wavell, then Viceroy of India,She was motivated by the senior leader of the Congress Party, Nirmal ChandraChaturvedi, MLC to actively involve in social work of women and children.

Her son, Ranjit Bhargava is a noted environmentalist and a Padma Shri awardee.

== Early life and career ==
Rani Lila was born in Bengaluru, Karnataka. She moved to Lucknow after getting married at the age of 16. She was known as Rani Sahiba and was one of the founding members of the National Council of Women in India (NCWI). Rani Lila also served as its president.

== Awards ==
In 1971, she was honoured by the Government of India with Padma Shri, the fourth highest Indian civilian award.

== Death ==
On 25 May 2014, Rani Lila Ram Kumar Bhargava died after a short illness at the PGI hospital in Bangalore. She had three sons and one daughter.
