= Shambhu (disambiguation) =

Shambhu may refer to:

People

- Shambhu Das (born 1934), an Indian classical musician and educator
- Shambhu Maharaj (1910 – 1970), a guru of the Lucknow gharana of Indian classical dance
- Shambhu Rai, a Nepali singer, songwriter, musician and producer
- Shambhu Shikhar, an Indian comedian and writer
- Shambhu Singh (1847 – 1874), Maharana of the princely state of Udaipur

Other uses

- Shambhu, Punjab, a village in Patiala district, Punjab, India
- Shankar Shambhu, a 1976 Bollywood action film
