= Atari Democrat =

1980s–1990s tech-friendly moderate U.S. Democratic politicians

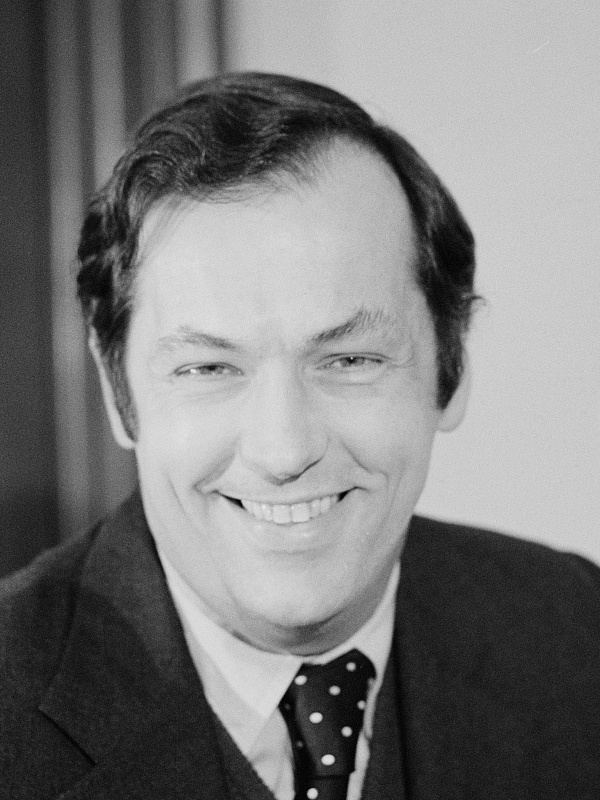
Bill Bradley

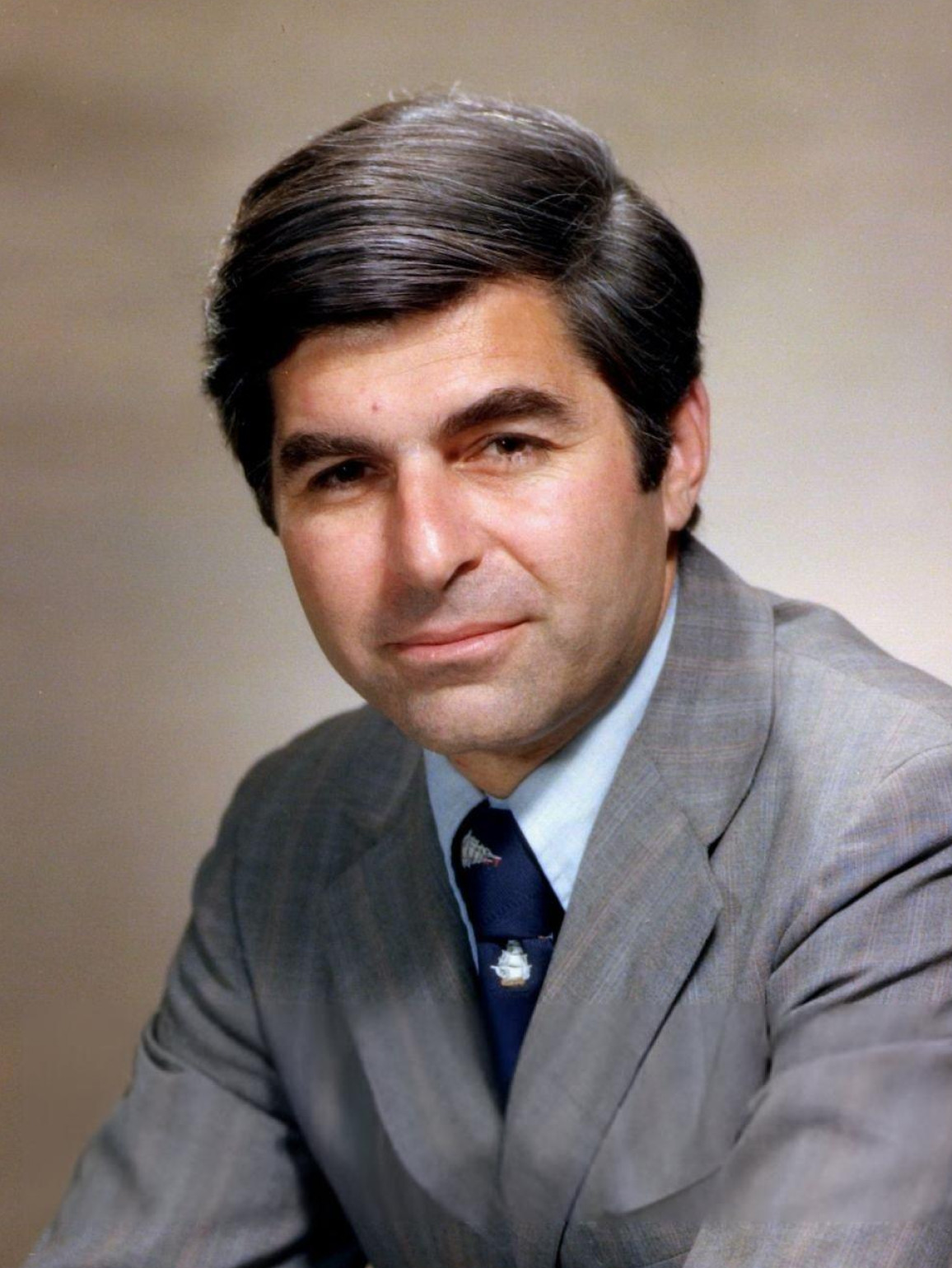
Michael Dukakis

Al Gore

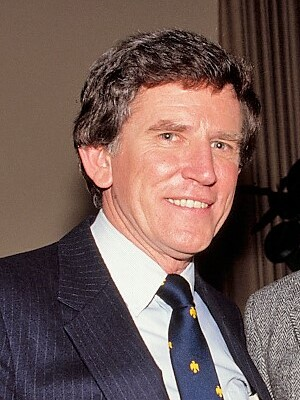
Gary Hart

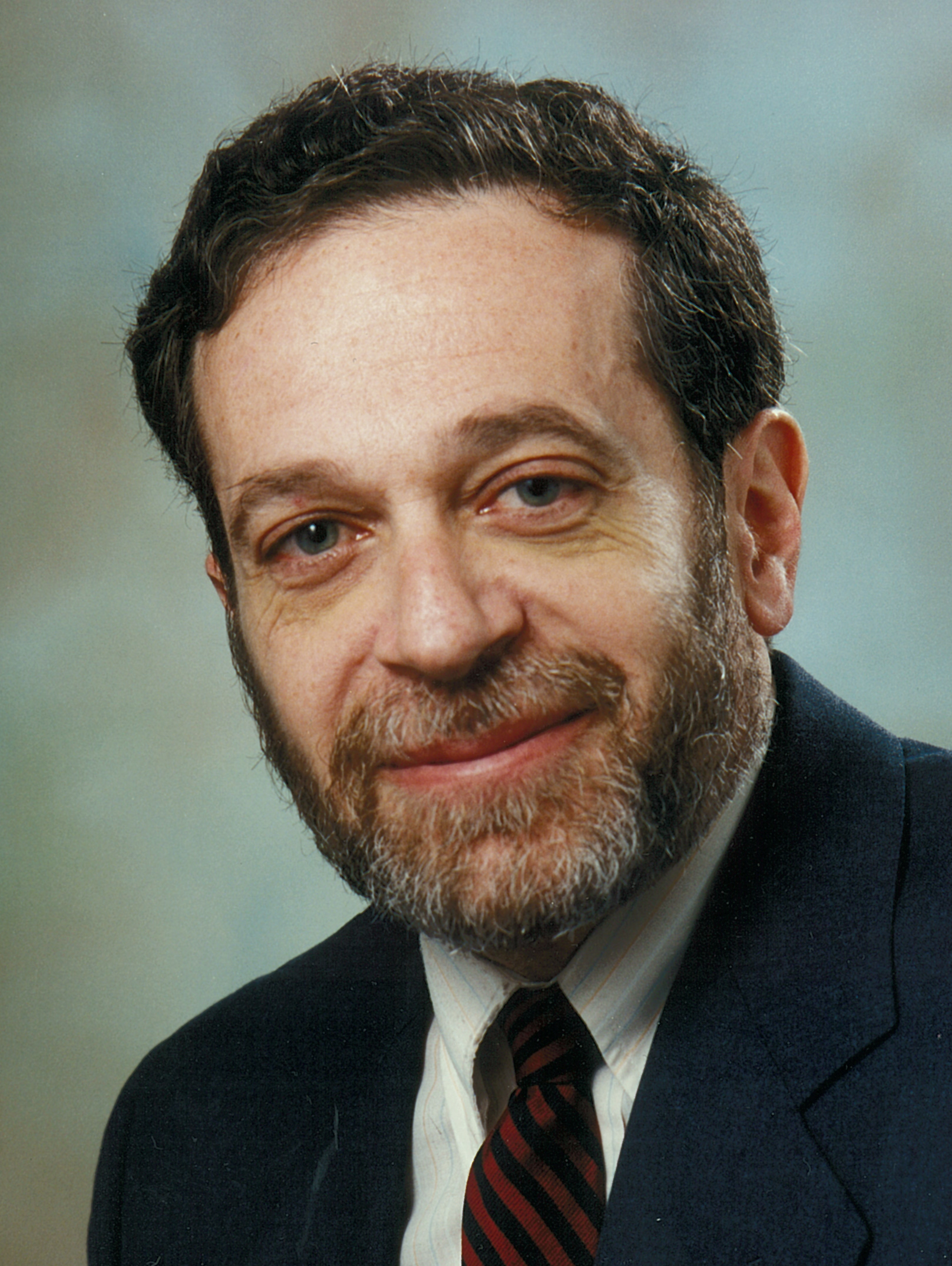
Robert Reich

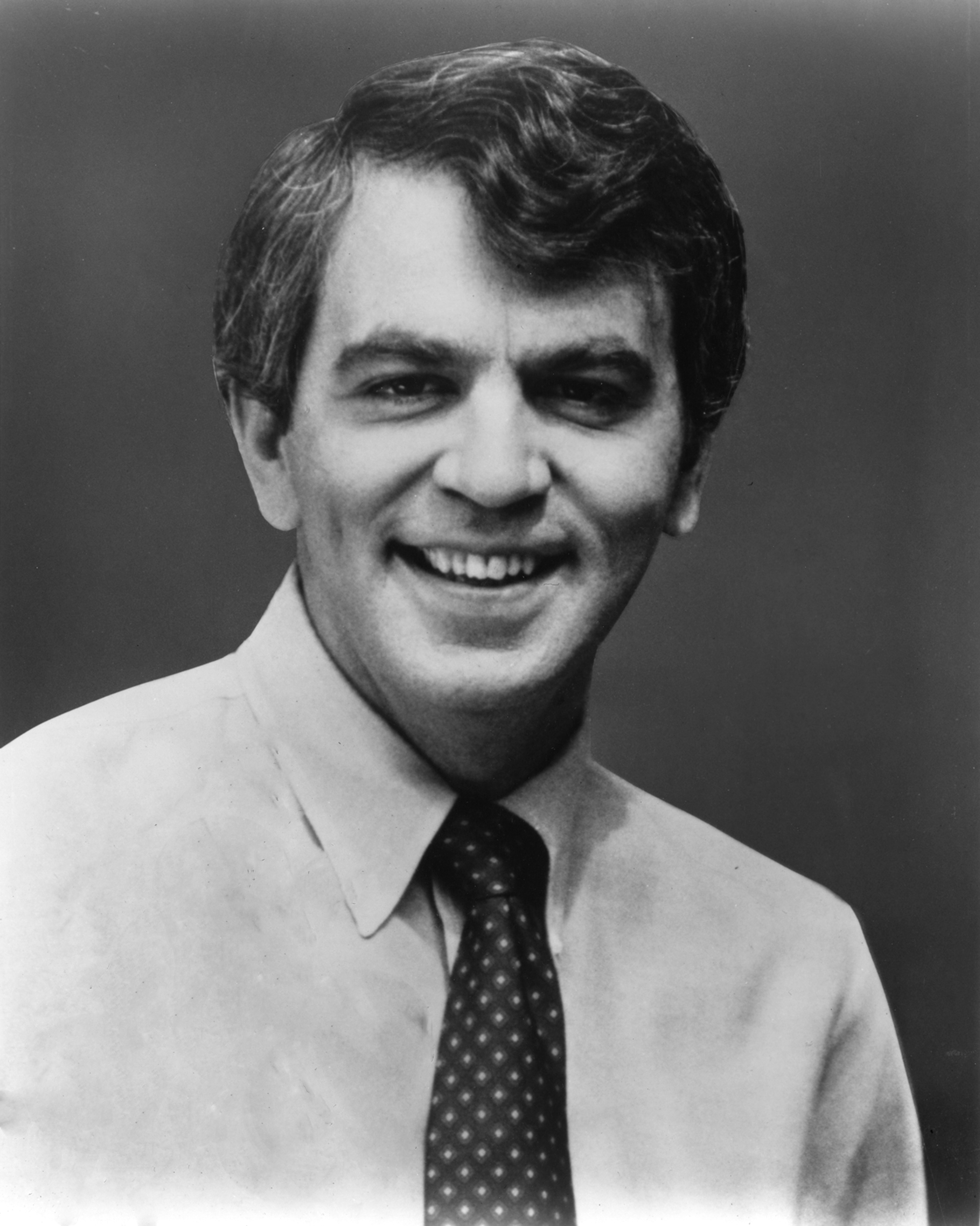
Paul Tsongas

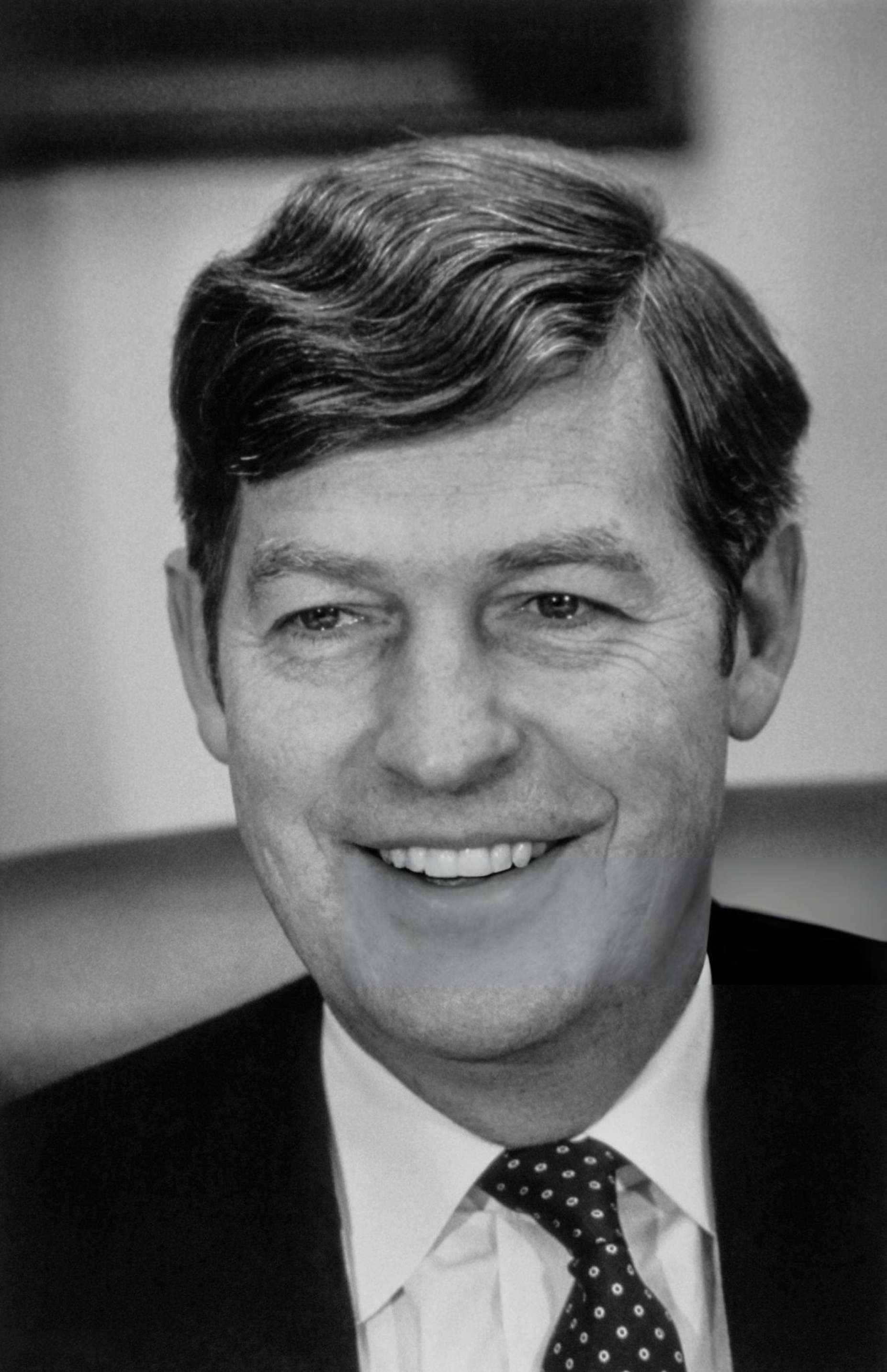
Tim Wirth

In 1980s and 1990s American politics, "Atari Democrat" referred to Democratic legislators who suggested that the support and development of high tech and related businesses would stimulate the economy and create jobs. The term refers to the Atari brand of video-game consoles and arcade machines, which was prominent in the 1980s.

The term was initially used in 1982 for Democratic politicians' focus on investing in high tech industries over sunset industries, primarily Gary Hart, Bill Bradley, Michael Dukakis, Al Gore, Paul Tsongas, and Tim Wirth. The New York Times discussed a generation gap that developed during the 1980s between older liberals who maintained an interest in traditional visions of social liberalism, and the Atari Democrats who attempted to find a middle ground. The Atari Democrats advocated for free markets, neo-liberalism, and for market forces being better able to offer solutions to environmental problems than actual regulations. The older liberals viewed them as advocates for Reaganomics.

Although rarely applied to Bill Clinton, the cohort’s tech-friendly, neo-liberal/market-oriented outlook fed into the New Democrat synthesis of the 1990s, and several figures linked with the label—most prominently his Vice President, Al Gore, and administration ally Tim Wirth—were influential during Clinton’s presidency.

== Definition ==
Chris Matthews coined Atari Democrat in January 1982 as a rechristening of young Watergate baby elected Democrats who shared a fascination with high tech. At a brunch in writer Margaret Carlson's Washington, D.C., home, Matthews, then administrative assistant to House Speaker Tip O'Neill, asked a group of guests including Gary Hart's speechwriter Ross Brown, and Walter Shapiro, who was working as a reporter for The Washington Post at the time, "You know what these people are, don't you?" before answering his own question to laughter, "They're Atari Democrats." Brown later told Hart about the phrase; Hart initially found the label amusing and used it in a speech.

The term appeared in print for the first time in an Elizabeth Drew article in the March 22, 1982, issue of The New Yorker. In a discussion of Dick Gephardt, Wirth, and like-minded Democratic colleagues focussing "on high technology, computers, 'the information society,' and so on", Drew mentioned that the "group is referred to by some members as 'Atari Democrats.'" The group, which included Hart, Bill Bradley, Michael Dukakis, Al Gore, Paul Tsongas, and Tim Wirth, were influenced by Lester Thurow and Robert Reich to focus on investing in high tech industries over sunset industries as a means to promote economic growth and social justice. By the end of 1982, Democrats were distancing themselves from the term as high tech companies had begun outsourcing jobs overseas.

A 1983 San Jose Mercury News article defined Atari Democrats as "smart young congressmen who sought to make the restoration of American business their issue". A 1984 article in The Philadelphia Inquirer defined the term as "a young liberal trying to push the party toward more involvement with high-tech solutions". It also observed, "Since July 1982, it has appeared in The New Yorker, Business Week, Fortune, Time and ... in The Wall Street Journal." In 1989, The New York Times suggested that Atari Democrats, now also known as "Democrats' Greens", were "young moderates who saw investment and high technology as the contemporary answer to the New Deal". The New York Times also discussed a generation gap that developed during the 1980s between older liberals who maintained an interest in traditional visions of social liberalism and Atari Democrats who attempted to find a middle ground.

When the Atari Democrats first emerged in the early Reagan years, their commitments to free markets and investment won them much criticism from older liberals, who considered their neo-liberalism as warmed-over Reaganism. Mr. Leahy, who combines his environmentalism with an old-fashioned commitment to social programs, argues that the cutbacks of the Reagan years suggested that it had been a mistake for members of his Congressional class to take the old programs for granted. But some of the Atari Democrats argue that their commitment to innovative uses of markets and to the environment are complementary. Mr. Wirth, for example, has sought to bring his two passions together by arguing that market forces can be harnessed to protect the environment and work better than "command-and-control regulations."

== Politicians ==
Specific individuals have been identified with Atari Democrats. Al Gore's "passion for technological issues, from biomedical research and genetic engineering to the environmental impact of the 'greenhouse effect,' linked him with other technological politicians on Capitol Hill known as Atari Democrats." Time magazine observed that Tim Wirth "made a reputation as the typical 'Atari Democrat,' who urges growth and investment in high-technology industries." The New York Times referred to Paul Tsongas as an Atari Democrat, "a member of the young generation of politicians and economists who looked to high technology as a source of jobs and economic growth." Gary Hart also referred to himself as an Atari Democrat and stated in 2003, "I was, early on in my Senate career, described as an Atari Democrat. No one would know what that means because there are no more Ataris, but we were among the first — a small group of us to forecast the transition of the economy from industrialized manufacturing to the information age."

== See also ==
- Factions in the Democratic Party (United States)
- Innovation economics
- New Democrats
- Supply-side progressivism
