= Simply Shekhar =

- Created by: In-House Productions
- Starring: Shekhar Suman
- Country of origin: India
- No. of episodes: 54

Production
- Producers: Shekhar Suman & Uday Sinh Wala
- Production location: Mumbai, Maharashtra
- Running time: 52 minutes

Original release
- Network: Zee TV
- Release: 30 July 2001

Simply Shekhar is an Indian late-night talk show that was hosted by popular comedy-actor Shekhar Suman, on Zee TV. It made its debut on 30 July 2001.

== Format ==
The show has various different segments, such as stand-up comedy, monologue, & chat with a celebrity guest. The show also contains a segment in which the host, Shekhar Suman mimics some of the most known politicians from all over the world. In the last segment of the show, Suman often sings to the live band on the show.

== Episodes ==
Episode #	Celebrity guest	Notes
1	Bal Thackeray	Leader of an Indian political party, Shiv Sena
2	Bal Thackeray	
3	Shilpa Shetty	Bollywood actress
4	Abhijeet Bhattacharya	Indian singer
5	Bejan Daruwalla	Astrologer
6	Sunidhi Chauhan	Indian singer
7	Belly dancers from Brazil	
8	Anil Kapoor	Bollywood actor
9	Anil Kapoor	
10	Anu Malik	Indian singer; episode also features some TV celebrities
11	Taufiq Qureshi	Classical fusion percussionist
12	Agosh	Contemporary band group
13	Himesh Reshammiya	Television Producer, Music Director, Composer, Singer and Actor; To promote Tere Naam
