= Avadh Akhbar =

Urdu newspaper founded by Munshi Nawal Kishore

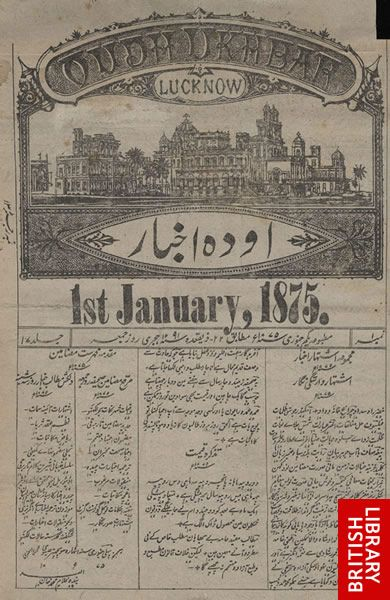
- 1 January 1875 issue
- Owner(s): Nawal Kishore Press
- Founder(s): Munshi Nawal Kishore
- Publisher: Nawal Kishore Press
- Founded: 1858
- Language: Urdu
- Headquarters: Lucknow, British India
- City: Lucknow
- Country: British India

Avadh Akhbar (or Awadh Akhbar or Oudh Akhbar) was an Urdu-language newspaper founded by Munshi Nawal Kishore, and published by Nawal Kishore Press from Lucknow, British India. It was launched in 1858 and lasted for almost a century. It was the most popular newspaper of its time, specialising in politics, social reform and literature. In 1877, it became the first Urdu daily in Northern India.

Pandit Ratan Nath Dhar Sarshar, one of the paper's editors, serialised his novel Fasana-e-Azad in this newspaper between 1878 and 1883. It is considered the first 'serialised novel' in Urdu.

== Founding ==
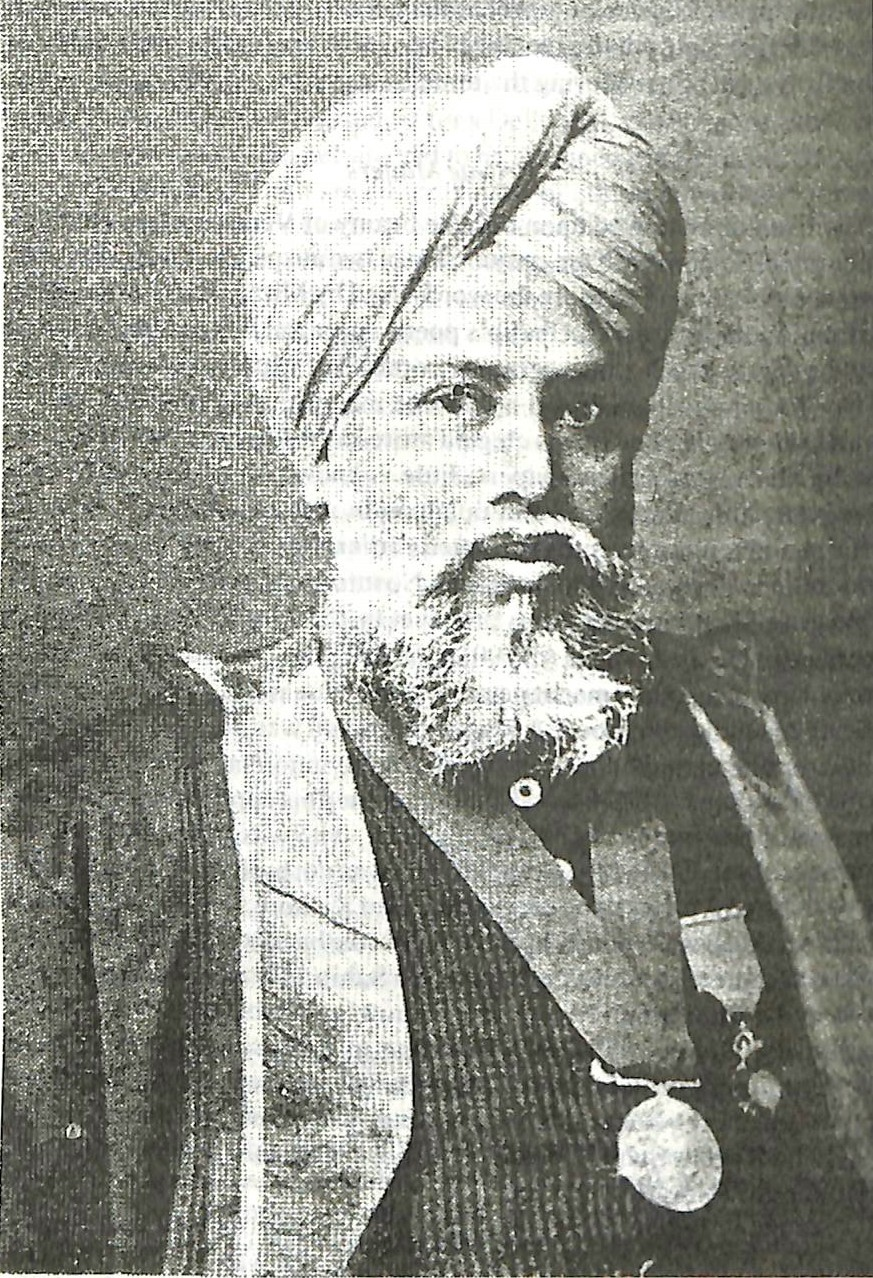
Munshi Nawal Kishore, founder of the paper

The date of the first publication of Avadh Akhbar is not traceable, but most authorities on Urdu journalism maintain that the first issue of Avadh Akhbar did not appear before January 1859. The issue of 8 January 1862 was marked as volume 4, no. 2, which suggests that the first issue was produced in 1859. Nawal Kishore launched the paper at some point in 1858; however, its regular weekly publication began the following year, starting a fresh count with volume 1 in January 1859.

== Format ==
Avadh Akhbar was initially a four-page weekly, 18 x 22 cm in size. Its front cover was illustrated with a drawing of Chattar Manzil, a building in Lucknow, and Farhat Bakhsh Palace. It appeared every Wednesday. From 1864, its size was increased to sixteen pages, and the format was expanded to 22 x 29 cm. From August 1871, it began to appear twice a week, and from May 1875 three times a week.

On 23 May 1877, it was announced through a special supplement to the paper that, starting from 1 June 1877, the paper would be published on a daily basis, initially for a six-month trial period. After receiving support from readers, it continued as a regular daily after the six-month trial period, becoming the first Urdu daily in Northern India.

== Content ==
Avadh Akhbar published local, national and international news. It provided extensive coverage of the ongoing wars, the Russo-Turkish war (1877–1878) and the second Anglo-Afghan war (1878–80), which interested the North Indian people at the time, especially Muslims. The paper introduced a special column entitled Maidān e Jang Kī Tāzatarīn Khabareṃ ('Latest news from the battlefield'), with maps and illustrations. The paper also contained articles on social and cultural topics, education and literature. It adopted a reformist and progressive attitude for social change. It published reports on Mushairas (poetic symposia), literary gatherings and book publications.

Following the appointment of Pandit Ratan Nath 'Sarshar' as editor, his Urdu novel Fasana-e-Azad began to appear in the paper in August 1878. Considered a landmark in modern Urdu fiction, the novel received unprecedented public interest and boosted the paper.

== Editors ==
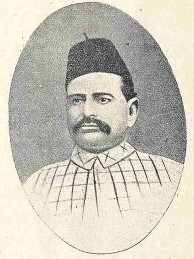
Pandit Ratan Nath Dhar Sarshar, one of the editors of Avadh Akhbar; his novel Fasana-e-Azad was serialised in the paper.

The initial issues of Avadh Akhbar were edited by Munshi Nawal Kishore himself. He was soon forced to entrust this time-consuming task to others. In 1859, Maulvi Hadi Ali 'Ashk', one of Nawal Kishore Press's scholars and calligraphers, was appointed the paper's first formal editor. Due to his failing health, Ashk left the editorship in 1864. According to an editorial notice which appeared in a later issue of the paper, Maulvi Fakhruddin 'Fakhr', a scholar, took over the editorship from Ashk, probably in 1865. In 1866, he was succeeded by Mehdi Husain Khan, the ex-proprietor of the Riyaz-e-Nur Press in Multan and former editor of an Urdu weekly of the same name.

Following Mehdi Husain Khan, in 1867 the editorship was assumed by Maulvi Raunaq Ali, a Persian and Urdu scholar and poet who wrote under the pen names 'Afsun' and 'Raunaq'. He had joined the Nawal Kishore Press as a proofreader for Avadh Akhbar but was soon promoted to editor. He was sent to Patiala by Nawal Kishore to oversee the establishment of a new printing office. In 1870, Maulvi Ghulam Muhammad Khan was appointed as the new editor. As well as a journalist and editor, he was a pupil of poet Mirza Ghalib and wrote poetry in Persian and Urdu under the pen-name 'Tapish'. He served as editor for eight years. During his editorship, Avadh Akhbar flourished. In 1876, he left the press following disagreements with Nawal Kishore. Sometime later he became editor again, and in March 1877, he announced in the paper that because of his ill health and low eyesight, he would quit Avadh Akhbar and start his own paper, Mushir-e-Qaisar-e-Hind. According to Garcin de Tassy, Maulvi Amjad Ali 'Ashhari' took charge of the paper for a short period after Tapish.

On 10 August 1878, Pandit Ratan Nath Dhar Sarshar was appointed as editor. Avadh Akhbar helped to launch his career as one of the most important fiction writers in Urdu. Sarshar's novel Fasana-e-Azad appeared serially, and later as a special supplement, in the paper from 1878 to 1880. It became the first Urdu novel to be serialised in a newspaper. Sarshar also published articles on literary, educational, political and social subjects in the paper, advocating progressive thoughts, enlightenment and modernity. Ulrike Stark remarks that Sarshar gave a new dimension to journalistic prose in Urdu and became a model for many later writers. Sarshar resigned from the editorship on 1 February 1880; however, he remained associated with the Nawal Kishore Press for some time. His novels Fasana-e-Jadid (later published in book form as Jam-e-Sarshar) and Sair-e-Kohsar were serialised as special supplements to Avadh Akhbar in 1880 and 1886 respectively.

After Sarshar, no formal editor was appointed. The editorial work was handled by several editors including Abdul Halim Sharar (assistant editor from 1880 to 1882), Mirza Hairat Dehlavi, Munshi Shiv Parshad, Maulvi Ahmad Hasan 'Shaukat' and Munshi Debi Parshad 'Sihr'.

== Circulation, frequency and editors ==
Circulation, frequency and editors of Avadh Akhbar.

Year	Circulation/Government Subscriptions	Frequency	Editor
1858		weekly	Munshi Nawal Kishore
1859–64		weekly	Maulvi Hadi Ali 'Ashk'
1865–66	ca. 400	weekly	Maulvi Fakhruddin 'Fakhr'; Muhammad Mehdi Husain Khan
1867–69		weekly	Maulvi Raunaq Ali 'Afsos'
1870		weekly	Maulvi Ghulam Muhammad Khan 'Tapish'
1871		weekly/ bi-weekly	Maulvi Ghulam Muhammad Khan 'Tapish'
1872		bi-weekly	Maulvi Ghulam Muhammad Khan 'Tapish'
1873		bi-weekly	Maulvi Ghulam Muhammad Khan 'Tapish'
1874		bi-weekly	Maulvi Ghulam Muhammad Khan 'Tapish'
1875–76	600	bi-weekly/ thrice-weekly	Maulvi Ghulam Muhammad Khan 'Tapish'
1877	820/50	thrice-weekly/ daily	Maulvi Ghulam Muhammad Khan 'Tapish'
1878	719/50	daily	Maulvi Amjad Ali 'Ashhari'; Pandit Ratan Nath Dhar Sarshar
1879	719/50	daily	Pandit Ratan Nath Dhar Sarshar
1880	685	daily	Editorial board consisting of several people, including: Abdul Halim Sharar (assistant editor from 1880 to 1882), Mirza Hairat Dehlavi, Munshi Shiv Parshad, Maulvi Ahmad Hasan 'Shaukat', Munshi Debi Parshad 'Sihr'
1881	715	daily	Editorial board consisting of several people, including: Abdul Halim Sharar (assistant editor from 1880 to 1882), Mirza Hairat Dehlavi, Munshi Shiv Parshad, Maulvi Ahmad Hasan 'Shaukat', Munshi Debi Parshad 'Sihr'
1882	620	daily	Editorial board consisting of several people, including: Abdul Halim Sharar (assistant editor from 1880 to 1882), Mirza Hairat Dehlavi, Munshi Shiv Parshad, Maulvi Ahmad Hasan 'Shaukat', Munshi Debi Parshad 'Sihr'
1883	620/90	daily	Editorial board consisting of several people, including: Abdul Halim Sharar (assistant editor from 1880 to 1882), Mirza Hairat Dehlavi, Munshi Shiv Parshad, Maulvi Ahmad Hasan 'Shaukat', Munshi Debi Parshad 'Sihr'
1884	605/94	daily	Editorial board consisting of several people, including: Abdul Halim Sharar (assistant editor from 1880 to 1882), Mirza Hairat Dehlavi, Munshi Shiv Parshad, Maulvi Ahmad Hasan 'Shaukat', Munshi Debi Parshad 'Sihr'
1885	605/94; 732/94	daily	Editorial board consisting of several people, including: Abdul Halim Sharar (assistant editor from 1880 to 1882), Mirza Hairat Dehlavi, Munshi Shiv Parshad, Maulvi Ahmad Hasan 'Shaukat', Munshi Debi Parshad 'Sihr'
1886	732/90; 660/94	daily	Editorial board consisting of several people, including: Abdul Halim Sharar (assistant editor from 1880 to 1882), Mirza Hairat Dehlavi, Munshi Shiv Parshad, Maulvi Ahmad Hasan 'Shaukat', Munshi Debi Parshad 'Sihr'
1887	660/94; 595/94	daily	Editorial board consisting of several people, including: Abdul Halim Sharar (assistant editor from 1880 to 1882), Mirza Hairat Dehlavi, Munshi Shiv Parshad, Maulvi Ahmad Hasan 'Shaukat', Munshi Debi Parshad 'Sihr'
1888	595/94; 690/94	daily	Editorial board consisting of several people, including: Abdul Halim Sharar (assistant editor from 1880 to 1882), Mirza Hairat Dehlavi, Munshi Shiv Parshad, Maulvi Ahmad Hasan 'Shaukat', Munshi Debi Parshad 'Sihr'
1889	690/94; 550/94	daily	Editorial board consisting of several people, including: Abdul Halim Sharar (assistant editor from 1880 to 1882), Mirza Hairat Dehlavi, Munshi Shiv Parshad, Maulvi Ahmad Hasan 'Shaukat', Munshi Debi Parshad 'Sihr'
1890	550/94	daily	Editorial board consisting of several people, including: Abdul Halim Sharar (assistant editor from 1880 to 1882), Mirza Hairat Dehlavi, Munshi Shiv Parshad, Maulvi Ahmad Hasan 'Shaukat', Munshi Debi Parshad 'Sihr'
1891	540/94	daily	Editorial board consisting of several people, including: Abdul Halim Sharar (assistant editor from 1880 to 1882), Mirza Hairat Dehlavi, Munshi Shiv Parshad, Maulvi Ahmad Hasan 'Shaukat', Munshi Debi Parshad 'Sihr'
1892	540/90	daily	Editorial board consisting of several people, including: Abdul Halim Sharar (assistant editor from 1880 to 1882), Mirza Hairat Dehlavi, Munshi Shiv Parshad, Maulvi Ahmad Hasan 'Shaukat', Munshi Debi Parshad 'Sihr'
1893	521/87; 503/92	daily	Editorial board consisting of several people, including: Abdul Halim Sharar (assistant editor from 1880 to 1882), Mirza Hairat Dehlavi, Munshi Shiv Parshad, Maulvi Ahmad Hasan 'Shaukat', Munshi Debi Parshad 'Sihr'
1894	503/92; 521/92	daily	Editorial board consisting of several people, including: Abdul Halim Sharar (assistant editor from 1880 to 1882), Mirza Hairat Dehlavi, Munshi Shiv Parshad, Maulvi Ahmad Hasan 'Shaukat', Munshi Debi Parshad 'Sihr'
1895	521/94	daily	Editorial board consisting of several people, including: Abdul Halim Sharar (assistant editor from 1880 to 1882), Mirza Hairat Dehlavi, Munshi Shiv Parshad, Maulvi Ahmad Hasan 'Shaukat', Munshi Debi Parshad 'Sihr'

== Reception ==
The paper appears to be Nawal Kishore's most profitable journalistic venture and received great success with Urdu readers. It was the most popular newspaper of its time, specialising in politics, social reform and literature.

Avadh Akhbar was the only commercially viable Urdu daily newspaper for a decade (1877–1887), until a rival newspaper, Paisa Akhbar, began being published in Lahore around 1887. It was read across a wide geographical region in India ranging from Delhi to Hyderabad, and from Lahore to Kolkata.
