= Tere Bina Kya Jeena =

- Directed by: P.P. Ghosh
- Produced by: Gulan Hussain
- Starring: Shekhar Suman; Moon Moon Sen
- Music by: Jugal Kishore-Tilak Raj
- Release date: June 9, 1989
- Running time: 134 minutes
- Country: India
- Language: Hindi

Tere Bina Kya Jeena is a 1989 Bollywood film directed by P.P. Ghosh and starring Shekhar Suman, Moon Moon Sen, Satish Shah and Raj Kiran.

== Cast ==
- Shekhar Suman as Amar
- Moon Moon Sen
- Satish Shah
- Rakesh Bedi
- Raj Kiran

== Soundtrack ==
Lyrics: Gulab Hussain

#	Title	Singer(s)
1	"Kya Jeena Tere Bina"	Jayshri Shivram, Mehul Kumar
2	"Mohabbat Ka Zamana"	Asha Bhosle, Shabbir Kumar
3	'Rooth Mere Sajna"	Mohammed Aziz, Jayshri Shivram
4	"Mere Dil KI Halat Dekh"	Asha Bhosle
