= Ranjit Bhargava =

Indian environmentalist

- Born: Lucknow, Uttar Pradesh, India
- Occupation: Environmentalist
- Parent(s): Raja Ram Kumar Bhargava; Rani Lila Ramkumar Bhargava
- Awards: Padma Shri; Order of the Golden Ark; Order of Merit of the Federal Republic of Germany
- Website: Official web site

Ranjit Bhargava, is an Indian environmentalist known for his endeavors towards environmental conservation and his efforts for obtaining UNESCO World Heritage Site status for the upper Ganga region. The Government of India honored him in 2010 with the fourth highest civilian award of Padma Shri. He is also a recipient of the Order of the Golden Ark from Prince Bernard of the Netherlands and the Order of Merit of the Government of Germany.

== Biography ==
Ranjit Bhargava was born in the family of Munshi Nawal Kishore, (1836–1895) a publisher, as a fifth generation member, in Lucknow, Uttar Pradesh, India. His parents were Raja Ram Kumar Bhargava, holder of the title Raja by the then Viceroy of India, Lord Wavell and Rani Lila Ramkumar Bhargava, a 1971 Padma Shri awardee. He headed the Uttar Pradesh chapter of the World Wide Fund for Nature (WWF). A member of the faculty of Foreign Affairs at Lucknow University, Bhargava is a Convener of the Indian National Trust For Art and Cultural Heritage (INTACH) where has instituted the INTACH Environmental Award in memory of his son, Anirudh Bhargava.

Bhargava is one of the founders of the Upper Ganga Region initiative, a collective campaign for getting the Upper Ganga Region, comprising Rishikesh and Haridwar, the status of UNESCO World Heritage Site. He is also involved with other environment related campaigns such as the Citizens' Forum on Public Policy and the campaign for the protection of Indian sites abroad, like INA Memorial in Singapore and Jim Corbett's tomb in Nyeri, Kenya. He has been honorary advisor for environment ecology and heritage to the Indian Army Central Command from 1991 to 2007. The Hive, a British heritage bungalow used by Christopher Corbett, the father of Jim Corbett, has been bought by Bhargava and is now a tourist attraction in Ayarpatta, Nainital.

Ranjit Bhargava is the author of a book on environment by the title, Environment: A Will To Fail.

== Awards and recognition ==
Ranjit Bhargava has been honored by the Government of Germany Order of Merit. This was followed by the title, the Officer of the Order of the Golden Ark, conferred by Prince Bernhard of the Netherlands.

In 2010. The Government of India included in the Republic Day honours list for the Padma Shri.
