= India's Laughter Champion =

Indian reality stand-up comedy series

- Genre: Reality
- Directed by: Hemant Sharma
- Judges: Shekhar Suman; Archana Puran Singh
- Country of origin: India
- Original language: Hindi
- No. of seasons: 1
- No. of episodes: 20

Production
- Producer: Banijay Asia
- Production location: Mumbai
- Camera setup: Multi-camera
- Running time: 50 minutes

Original release
- Network: Sony Entertainment Television
- Release: 11 June – 27 August 2022

India's Laughter Champion is an Indian reality stand-up comedy series produced by Banijay Asia. The show was broadcast on Sony Entertainment Television. The show was hosted by Rochelle Rao, while Shekhar Suman and Archana Puran Singh are the judges. It replaced The Kapil Sharma Show. It aired its finale on 27 August 2022. It was won by Rajat Sood.

== Concept ==
The show is based on a format where stand-up comedians perform and entertain judges.

== Judges ==
- Shekhar Suman
- Archana Puran Singh

== Guest ==
- Shilpa Shetty
- Vijay Deverakonda
- Rajkummar Rao
- Taapsee Pannu
- Mithali Raj
- Ananya Panday

== Contestant ==
- Rajat Sood- WINNER
- Nitesh Shetty- 1st Runner-up
- Vighnesh Pandey- 2nd Runner-up
- Jayvijay Sachan- 2nd Runner-up
- Ketan Singh
- Gaurav Dubey
- Hemant Pandey
- Abhay Sharma
- Shambhu Shikhar
- Haseeb Khan
- Mujawar Malegaowi
- Himanshu Bawandar
- Jaswant Singh Rathore
- Amit Singh Andotra(Chui)
- Ravi Gupta (world famous)
- Aditya Kulshreshth (Kullu)

== Laughter ke SIRpanch ==
- Rajpal Yadav
- Sugandha Mishra
- Sunil Grover
- Raju Srivastav
- Jamie Lever
- Suresh Albela
- Rajeev Nigam
- Sardar Pratap Faujdar
- Surender Sharma
- Arun Gemini
- Dr. Tushar Shah
- Gurpreet Ghuggi
- Chetan Shashital

== See also ==
- List of programs broadcast by Sony Entertainment Television
