= Manav Hatya =

1996 Indian Hindi-language film

Manav Hatya is a 1986 Hindi feature film starring Shekhar Suman, Madhuri Dixit, Sunil Thapa, Gulshan Grover, Sharat Saxena, Sriram Lagoo and Arvind Deshpande. The film was directed by Sudarshan Rattan and produced by Sarwan Singh Rehal.

== Cast ==
- Shekhar Suman as Varun Shourie, Editor
- Madhuri Dixit as Rama
- Gulshan Grover
- Arvind Deshpande as Ramkrishna
- Sharat Saxena as Police Inspector Joseph
- Rajesh Puri as Muthuswamy, assistant to Varun
- Tom Alter
- Sudhir Dalvi as Minister Baakelal
- Praveen Kumar
- Sunil Thapa as Police Constable Bajirao Kale
- Sudha Chopra

== Music ==
Manav Hatya

Soundtrack album by Anu Malik
- Released: March 10, 1986
- Genre: Feature film soundtrack
- Language: Hindi
- Label: T-Series

The soundtrack of the film was composed by Anu Malik with lyrics by Rajendra Krishan.

1. "Alap (Manav Hatya)" - Anuradha Paudwal
2. "Chaurahe Pe Khada Kabira" - Suresh Wadkar
3. "Pyar Mein Jitni Shartein Hain" - Anuradha Paudwal, Mohammed Aziz
4. "Simki Samoka" - Kavita Krishnamurthy, Malik Brothers
