= Wah Janaab =

- Written by: Sharad Joshi
- Directed by: Chitrartha Singh
- Starring: Shekhar Suman; Kiran Juneja; Shailendra Goyal
- Country of origin: India
- Original language: Hindi
- No. of seasons: 1

Production
- Running time: 20 minutes

Original release
- Network: DD National
- Release: 1984

Wah Janaab is an Indian television series that aired in 1984 on DD National. It was directed by Chitrartha Singh and written by Sharad Joshi. based after 1878-1883 Ratan Nath Dhar Sarshar's classic novel Fasana-E-Azad.

== Cast ==
- Shekhar Suman
- Kiran Juneja
- Shailendra Goyal
