= Order of the Golden Ark =

Order of merit in the Netherlands

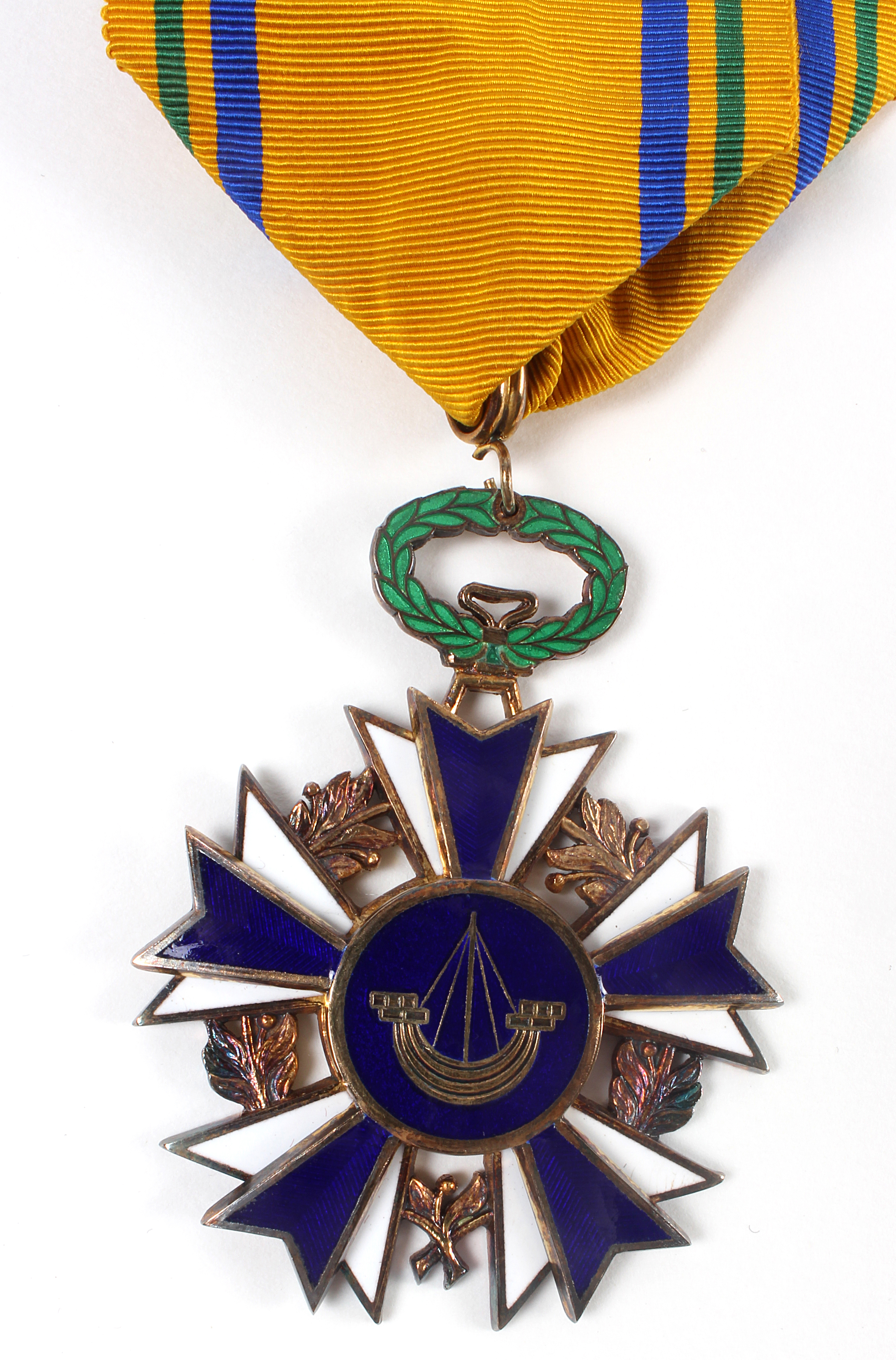
- Kingdom of the Netherlands Commander of the Order of the Golden Ark badge of order
- Type: Order of Merit
- Country: Netherlands
- Awarded for: Significant contributions to nature conservation
- Status: Still living recipients, but no longer awarded since 1999
- Grand Master: Unknown
- Grades: Commander (Dutch Commandeur); Officer (Dutch Officier); Knight (Dutch Ridder)

Precedence
- Next (higher): Teutonic Order, Bailiwick of Utrecht
- Next (lower): Cross for the Four Day Marches; Awards of Dutch NGO's
- Ribbon of the order

The Order of the Golden Ark (Dutch: Orde van de Gouden Ark) is a Dutch order of merit established in 1971 by Prince Bernhard of the Netherlands. It is awarded to people for major contributions to nature conservation. Although not awarded by the government of the Netherlands, it is considered by the government as a recognized chivalrous order. Since its inception, over 300 people have been recognised by the award. Now that Prince Bernhard has died, the future of the order is uncertain.

== Notable recipients ==
- Ranjit Bhargava
- Carl Gustav of Sweden
- Gerald Durrell
- Sylvia Earle
- Valerie Taylor
- Tony Fitzjohn
- Zafar Futehally
- Jane Goodall
- Gyanendra of Nepal
- Roger Tory Peterson
- Prince Philip, Duke of Edinburgh (awarded 1971)
- Ian Player
- Suman Sahai
- Ravindra Kumar Sinha
- Marc van Roosmalen
- Lyall Watson
- Delia Owens
- Mobutu Sese Seko (awarded 1973)
- Emil Salim (awarded 1982)
- David B. Wingate

== See also ==
- List of environmental awards
