= Kiran Juneja =

Indian actress

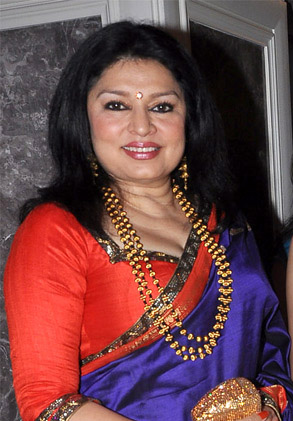
- Born: 10 February 1964 (age 62); New Delhi, India
- Occupation: Actress
- Years active: 1984–present
- Spouse: Ramesh Sippy (m. 1991)
- Relatives: G. P. Sippy (father-in-law)

Kiran Juneja is an Indian actress who works in Hindi cinema.

== Personal life ==
She is second wife of filmmaker Ramesh Sippy. She hails from Punjabi Bagh area of New Delhi, India and her father was a doctor.

== Career ==
In 1984, she started her acting career by signing an Indo-Italian co-production film called Shaheen as the leading lady, followed by a serial called Paying Guest for Rajshree Films and Wah Janaab opposite Shekhar Suman. She went on to act in several serials such as Ye Jo Hai Zindagi, Kismat, Junoon, Siddhi, Barsaat(1995), Banjara Guest House, Mouth Full of Sky, Waqt Ki Raftar, Swabhimaan, Gaatha, Palchin, Tere Ghar Ke Saamne with Raju Kher, Commander, Colonel, Tere Mere Sapne, Suraag, Kuch Love Kuch Masti, Koi Dil Me Hai and Sindoor Tere Naam Ka.

She is best known for her role of Ganga in Mahabharat and Veerawali in Buniyaad.

== Filmography ==
=== Film ===
- All films are in Hindi unless otherwise noted.

Year	Title	Role	Notes
1984	Prerana	Gauri	
1986	Ek Misaal	Rekha	
1988	Mulzim	Vijay's sister	
1988	Hamara Khandaan	Rita	
1988	Brahma Vishnu Maheshwara	Rekha	Kannada film
1990	Amba	Prabha R Singh	
1991	Akayla	Neetu	
1991	Pucca Badmash	Gulnar	
1992	Sarphira	Shikha	
1992	Shiv Mahima	Parvati	
1993	Badi Bahen	Seema Kedarnath	
1994	Jai Maa Vaishno Devi	Vaishnavo Devi	
1995	Zamaana Deewana	Police Inspector Shalini Shrivastava	
2005	Bunty Aur Babli	Vimmy's mother	
2006	Khosla Ka Ghosla	Sudha Khosla	
2006	Krrish	Amisha Kalyanan	
2007	Jab We Met	Mrs. Dhillon	
2007	Marigold	Mrs. Rajput	Hindi/English film
2007	Fear	Kesar Ma	
2008	Fashion	Mrs. Mathur	
2008	The Other End of the Line	Aunt Pummi	Hindi/English film
2009	Chandni Chowk to China	Mrs. Kohung	
2010	Badmaash Company	Maya Kapoor	
2011	Sahi Dhandhe Galat Bande	Chief Minister	
2015	Mukhtiar Chadha	Mukhtiar's Mother	Punjabi film
2020	Shimla Mirchi	Avinash's mami	
2022	Mister Mummy	Koni	

=== Television ===
Year	Title	Role	Notes
1984	Wah Janaab		
1985	Yeh Jo Hai Zindagi	Rashmi	
1986–1987	Buniyaad	Veeravali / Pragyavati	
1988–1990	Mahabharat	Ganga	
1993	Junoon	Nalini Mathur	
1997–1998	Mahabharat Katha	Ganga	
1998–1999	The Kiran Juneja Show	Host	
1999	Waqt Ki Raftar	Sidhi Devi	
2003	Kkoi Dil Mein Hai	Mrs Punj	
2005–2007	Sinndoor Tere Naam Ka	Kavita Raizada	
2007	CID	Mandira	1 episode
2015	Sumit Sambhal Lega	Pammi Ahluwalia	
2015–present	Koshish Se Kamyabi Tak	Host	

=== Web series ===
Year	Title	Role	Platform	Notes
2020	Abhay	Manda	ZEE5	Season 2 Episode 4

=== Dubbing roles ===
Film title	Actor(s)	Character	Dub Language	Original Language	Original Year Release	Dub Year Release	Notes
Ant-Man and the Wasp	Michelle Pfeiffer	Janet van Dyne	Hindi	English	2018	2018	
