= Shambhu Shikhar =

Indian comedian, novelist, poet (born 1984)

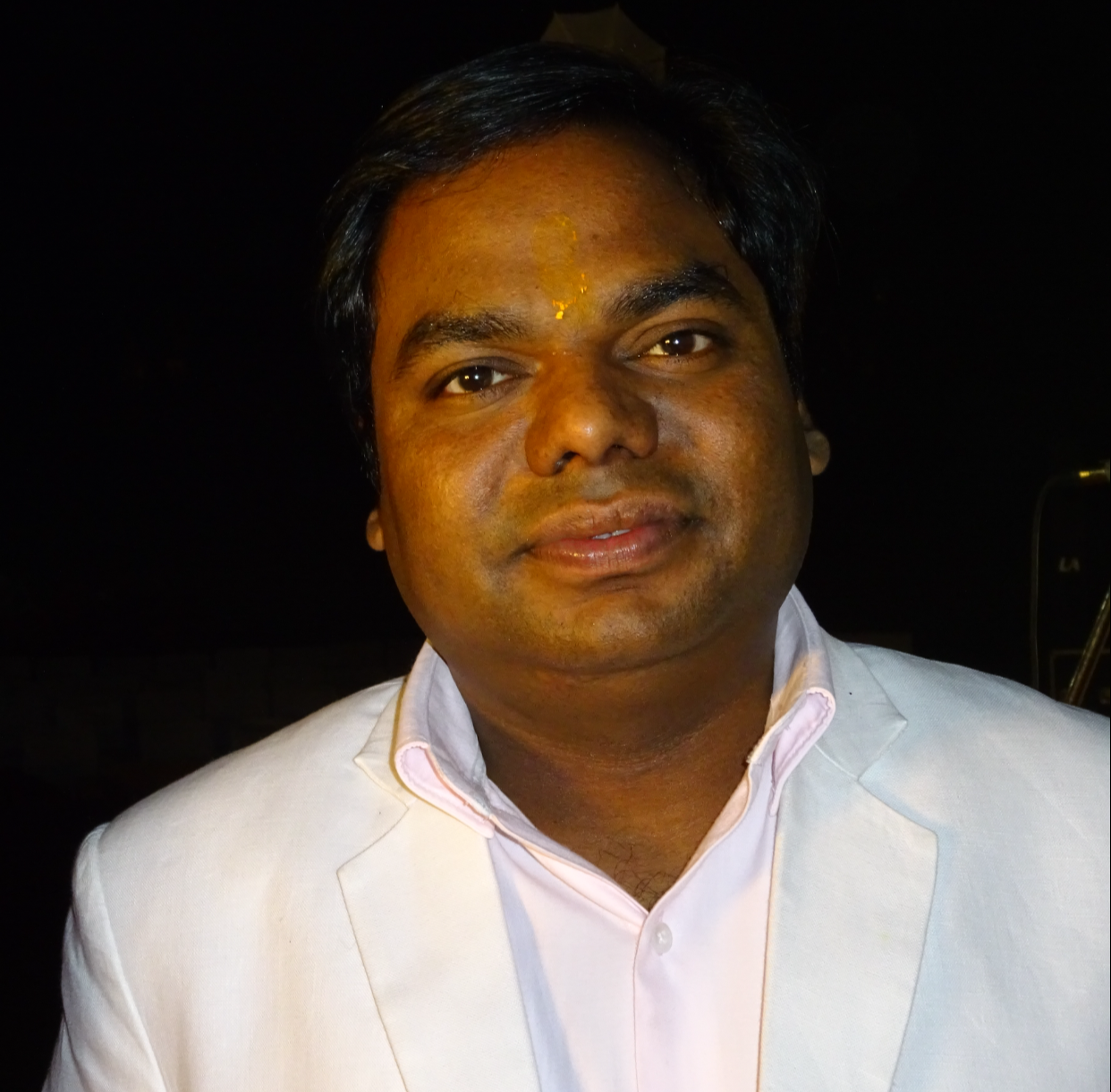
- Born: Shambhu Chaudhary; 10 January 1984 (age 42); Madhubani, Bihar, India
- Education: Motilal Nehru College (Delhi University)
- Occupations: Comedian,, novelist, poet
- Notable work: The Great Indian Laughter Challenge, Lapete Mein Netaji and Wah! Wah! Kya Baat Hai!, India's Laughter Champion
- Awards: Bharatendyu Harishchand Puraskar by the Hindi Academy, Government of Delhi (2010); Sahitya Shikhar Samman by the Government of Haryana (2011)
- Website: shambhushikhar.com

Shambhu Shikhar (born 10 January 1984) is an Indian comedian, novelist, and poet.

From Madhubani, Bihar, India, he was a semi-finalist in the third season of The Great Indian Laughter Challenge, which aired on StarPlus in 2007. He was awarded with a Bharatendyu Harishchand Puraskar by the Hindi Academy, Government of Delhi in 2010.

He has appeared in television shows, including Wah! Wah! Kya Baat Hai! on SAB TV, News18 India's Netaji Lapete Mein, and Idhar Udhar and Shikhar on 94.3 MY FM.

== Life and career ==
He was born on 10 January 1984, in Madhubani, Bihar, India.

Shikhar completed a master's degree in political science from Motilal Nehru College, a constituent college of Delhi University in New Delhi.

== Career ==
He started his career as a standup comedian on Wah! Wah! Kya Baat Hai! on SAB TV, hosted by Shailesh Lodha and Neha Mehta. He then appeared on StarPlus's comedy show The Great Indian Laughter Challenge in 2007, where he was a semi-finalist.

He has participated in Kavi sammelan gatherings at Red Fort in Delhi and in various other cities in India and Dubai.

Shikhar has published various novels and collections of his poems. He previously published Silwaton Ki Mehak (2014), Sanyasi Yoddhay (2017) and the novel Organic Love II with Harf Publications (2022). He is working on his upcoming book Chini Ko Jama Karke Fir Se Ganna Bana Du.

He had an Internet hit with his song "Hum Dharti Putra Bihari".

Shikhar is also known as a political satirist.

In 2022, Shikhar was a contestant in India's Laughter Champion, judged by Shekhar Suman and Archana Puran Singh.

== Bibliography ==
- Silwaton Ki Mehak 2014
- Organic Love II, 2022 novel, ISBN 978-8195382859
- Chaand Par Plot "चाँद पर प्लॉट", ISBN 978-9355216175

== Television ==
Show	Television channel
Wah! Wah! Kya Baat Hai!	SAB TV
The Great Indian Laughter Challenge	StarPlus
Lapete Mein Netaji	News18 India
India's Laughter Champion	SONY TV
