= Sunrise industry =

A sunrise industry (sometimes also called as emerging industry) is a new industry that is growing fast and is expected to become important in the future. Examples of sunrise industries include hydrogen fuel production, petrochemical industry, food processing industry, and space tourism.

== See also ==
- Sunset industry
