= Bhargava =

Race in Hinduism

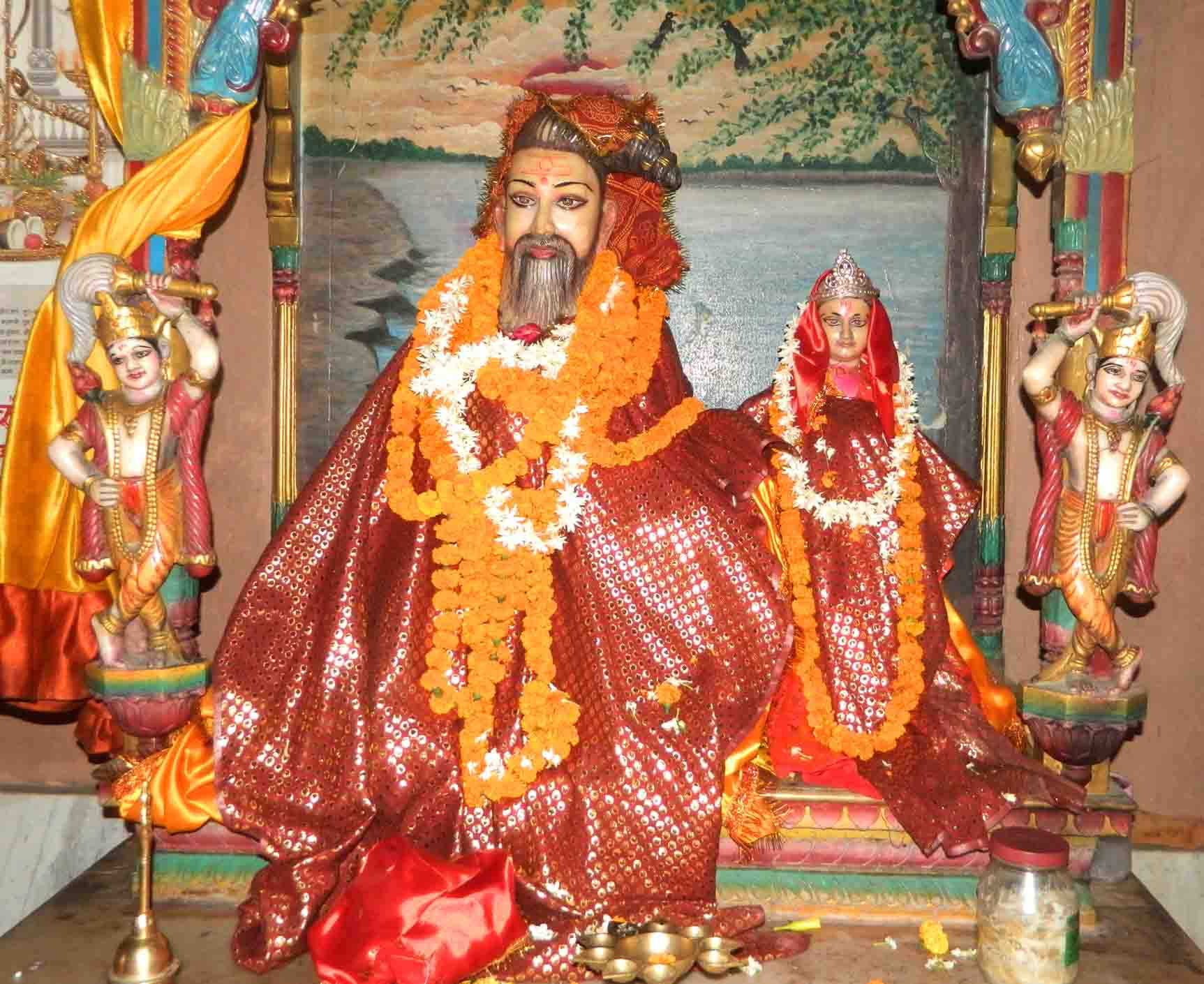
Murti of Bhrigu, founder of the Bhargava race.

Bhargava (Sanskrit: भार्गव, romanized: Bhārgava) or Bhṛguvamsha refers to a Brahmin race or dynasty that is said to have been founded by the legendary Hindu sage Bhrigu.

== Legend ==
In Hinduism, the Bhargavas are the purohitas, the family priests, of the daityas and the danavas. They are regarded to be associated with the Angiras, the Atharvans, and the Ribhus, races named for their founders, who were also great sages. Some of the notable characters in Hinduism who belong to the Bhargava race include:

- Chyavana
- Shukra
- Shaunaka
- Richika
- Jamadagni
- Parashurama
- Valmiki

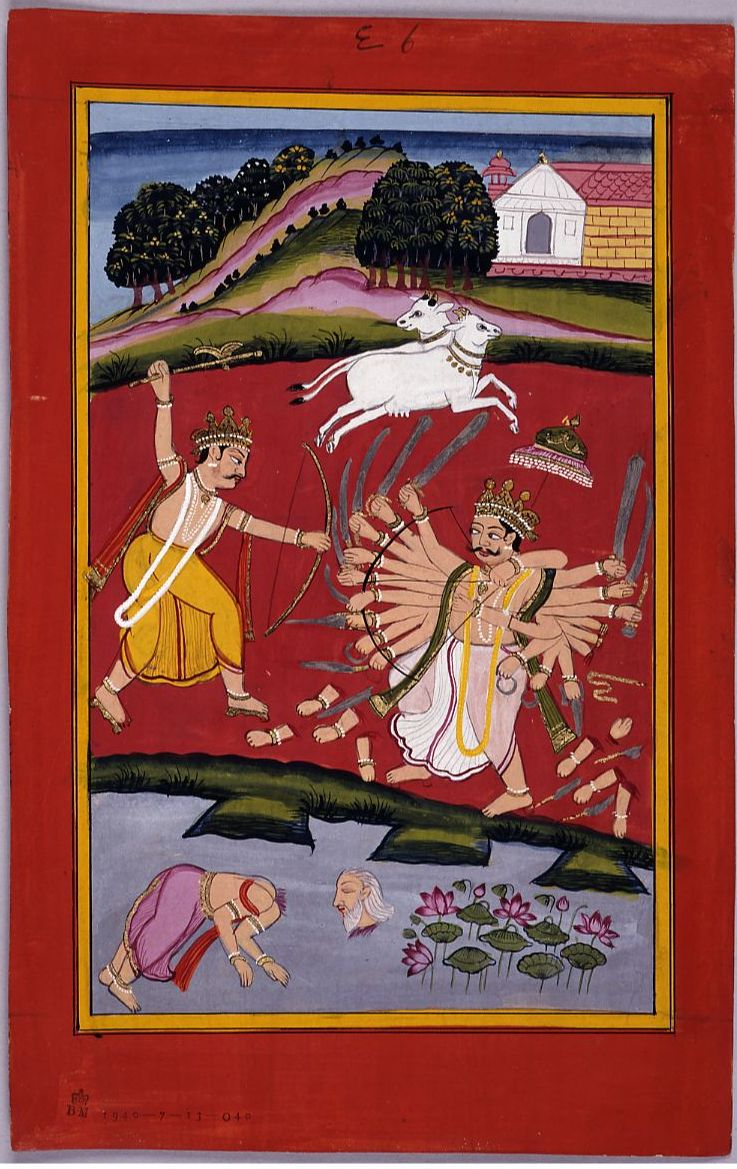
The Bhargava Parashurama slays Kartavirya Arjuna.

The rulers of the Haihaya dynasty are first described to be great patrons of Bhargavas such as Richika, to whom the latter served as the chief priest. When his son, Jamadagni, is murdered by the Haihaya king, Kartavirya Arjuna, his son, Parashurama, the incarnation of Vishnu, slays him. When his resurrected father is killed once more by the king's son, he begins a quest to wipe out all the Kshatriya rulers he could find on earth, and bequeaths the colonised land to the Saptarishi.

== Lineage ==
In later legends, the Bhargavas were associated with the Haihayas, the Anarta of Gujarat, Kanyakubja of Madhyadesa, as well as the rulers of Malabar.

Today, Bhargava also refers to a Brahmin community in India, who claim descent from the sage Bhrigu.
