= Pushpa Mittra Bhargava =

Indian scientist, administrator and writer

- Born: 22 February 1928; Ajmer, British Raj
- Died: 1 August 2017 (aged 89); Hyderabad, India
- Awards: Padma Bhushan
- Scientific career
- Fields: Biology (Biotechnology)
- Workplaces: Centre for Cellular and Molecular Biology (CCMB)
- Website: pmbhargava.com

Pushpa Mittra Bhargava (22 February 1928 – 1 August 2017) was an Indian scientist, writer, and administrator. He founded the Centre for Cellular and Molecular Biology, a federally funded research institute, in Hyderabad. He was outspoken and highly influential in the development of scientific temper in India, and argued that scientific rationalism needed to be cultivated as a civic duty.

== Life ==
=== Early life ===
Bhargava was born in Ajaymeru (Rajasthan) on 22 February 1928 in a middle-class family, to Ram Chandra Bhargava, a medical doctor and public health professional, and his wife, Gayatri Bhargava. At age ten, his family shifted to Varanasi, where he was formally admitted to Besant Theosophical School directly to class nine. Until then he was home educated under the tutelage of his grandfather. After school, he completed intermediate from Queen's College, one of the best institutions in Uttar Pradesh at that time. He received his B.Sc. in 1944 with Physics, Chemistry, Mathematics, and obtained an M.Sc. degree in 1946 in organic chemistry. He joined Lucknow University for doctoral programme and earned Ph.D. in synthetic organic chemistry in 1949, at age 21.

=== Career ===
After completing Ph.D. at Lucknow University, Bhargava moved to Hyderabad. Between 1950 and 1953 he worked first at the then Central Laboratories for Scientific and Industrial Research, and then at Osmania University, both at Hyderabad. In 1953, he went to US on a postdoctoral fellowship in the McArdle Memorial Laboratory of Cancer Research, University of Wisconsin, Madison (US), working in the laboratory of Charles Heidelberger. During 1956–57, he worked at National Institute for Medical Research, UK, as a special Wellcome Trust Research Fellow and made a transition from chemistry to biology. In 1958, he returned to Hyderabad and joined the same Central Laboratories for Scientific and Industrial Research which was by now taken over by Council of Scientific and Industrial Research (CSIR) and named Regional Research Laboratory (now known as Indian Institute of Chemical Technology) as Scientist B.

Bhargava worked in the United States, the United Kingdom, France and Germany, and travelled in over 50 countries. He produced more than 125 scientific publications. Most of his research career was carried out in Hyderabad where he established the Centre for Cellular and Molecular Biology (CCMB) in 1977. He retired from the directorship of CCMB in 1990 to join the newly created CSIR Distinguished Fellowship from which he was relieved in 1993.

==== Establishment of CCMB ====
Bhargava set up the Centre of Cellular and Molecular Biology (CCMB) in Hyderabad, Telangana. CCMB is a research organization in areas of modern biology. It was set up initially as a semi-autonomous centre on 1 April 1977, with the Biochemistry Division of the then Regional Research Laboratory (presently, Indian Institute of Chemical Technology), Hyderabad forming its nucleus and Bhargava heading the new Centre. During 1981–82, CCMB was accorded the status of a full-fledged national laboratory with its own Executive Committee and Scientific Advisory Council.

==== Policy maker in Indian science ====
Bhargava was a well-known critic of Indian governmental policies, and attained the post of vice-chairman in the National Knowledge Commission. He served as a member in the National Security Advisory Board and nominee of the Supreme Court of India on the Genetic Engineering Appraisal Committee of the Government of India. He opposed the hasty approval of GM foods in India, and called for more testing and setting up of an independent regulatory body for generation of biosafety data of GM crops. He also opposed the Biotechnology Regulatory Authority of India (BRAI) Bill, calling it "unconstitutional, unethical, unscientific, self-contradictory, and not people-oriented". He was the only scientist in the CSIR who had the will to support Shiva Ayyadurai, an expatriate scientist who was sacked from the CSIR by Samir Brahmachari when he authored a report that was critical of the CSIR leadership, alleging corruption, cronyism and nepotism. On 30 October 2009, he wrote a personal letter to Prime Minister Manmohan Singh requesting him to meet with Ayyadurai and review his report. He stated in his letter: "I have gone through Dr. Ayyadurai's report CSIR Tech: Path Forward and find it to be excellent." He also wrote in his letter that he believed Ayyadurai's criticisms on the functioning of CSIR were valid.

==== Rationalism and science popularisation ====
Bhargava has long been involved in the promotion of science and rationality and opposing superstition. He has been associated with the Association of Scientific Workers in India (ASWI) which was established in 1946 as a trade union of scientists, one of the main objectives of which was to develop scientific temper.

In 1963, Bhargava, along with Satish Dhawan and Abdur Rahman, the historian of science, felt the need to set up a national society for the promotion of scientific temper. Thus they launched the Society for the Promotion of Scientific Temper at an international symposium on nucleic acids held in the then Regional Research Laboratory at Hyderabad in January 1964.

Bhargava has participated in many debates related to science and superstitions and criticised the deplorable lack of scientific temper in society. He has been one of a few rationalists in India to raise voice against influential religious priests and gurus. His book The Angels, Devil and Science deals with the very subject of scientific temper in India. He played an important role in having scientific temper incorporated as a fundamental duty of the citizens of India, in the 42nd constitutional amendment in 1976. He was one of the key architects of the widely known 'Statement on Scientific temper', issued jointly by a group of liberal, committed and rational high-achievers of the country. The statement issued in 1981, has not only been debated and discussed in several forums, but continues to be referred to in writings and speeches even today.

During the NDA rule in 2000, the Government of India decided to ask universities to introduce academic courses and offer science degrees in astrology. Bhargava and others, who are not named, filed a writ petition to oppose it. The write petition was dismissed by the Andhra Pradesh High Court, and the Justice Sinha did not impose any punitive costs for bringing this meritless petition to the court. Bhargava also challenged the concerned Ministry in the Supreme Court through a Public Interest Litigation which was dismissed by the Supreme Court of India.

=== Death ===
Bhargava died on 1 August 2017, aged 89 at Hyderabad, India.

== Awards ==
Bhargava received Padma Bhushan from the President of India in 1986, but returned it in 2015 as an act of protest against the Indian government's active erosion of spaces for dissent within the country.

== Books ==
The books co-authored by Bhargava include:

- Proteins of Seminal Plasma, published by John Wiley, New York (1990); co-authors S. Shivaji, Karl Heinz Scheit, ISBN 978-0-471-84685-7
- The Saga of Indian Science since Independence: In a Nutshell, published by Universities Press (2003); co-author Chandana Chakrabarti, ISBN 81-7371-435-5
- Angels, Devil, and Science: A Collection of Articles on Scientific Temper, published by National Book Trust (2007); co-author Chandana Chakrabarti, ISBN 978-81-237-5184-9
- Agenda for the Nation: An Untold Story of the UPA Government, published by Mapin Publishing Pvt.Ltd. (2014); co-author Chandana Chakrabarti, ISBN 1-935677-45-4
- The Two Faces of Beauty: Science and Art, published by Mapin Publishing Pvt.Ltd. (2014); co-author Chandana Chakrabarti, ISBN 1-935677-24-1
