= Suman Sahai =

Indian biochemist and activist

- Citizenship: India
- Education: Ph.D., 1975
- Alma mater: Indian Agricultural Research Institute
- Occupation: Founding director
- Organization: Gene Campaign
- Awards: Order of the Golden Ark, Borlaug Award, Padma Shri

Suman Sahai is an Indian activist and the founder of Gene Campaign.

== Career ==
Sahai obtained a Ph.D. from the Indian Agricultural Research Institute in 1975. She then successively worked at the University of Alberta, University of Chicago, and the University of Heidelberg, where she obtained her habilitation in human genetics. According to the Web of Science, Sahai has published over 40 articles, mostly on policy issues relating to genetically modified organisms, which have been cited about 200 times, giving her an h-index of 9. She is director of the NGO, Gene Campaign.

== Awards ==
- Order of the Golden Ark, 2001
- Borlaug Award, 2004
- Padma Shri, 2011

== Plagiarism ==
In April 2013, Sahai was shown to have committed plagiarism in her habilitation thesis, which had been submitted to the University of Heidelberg in 1986. In addition, she was accused of presenting herself as being or having been a professor at that University, without ever actually having occupied such a position. On 14 April 2013, the University of Heidelberg confirmed that plagiarism had taken place, that Sahai has no right to call herself a professor of the University of Heidelberg, and that in consequence Sahai had agreed to renounce her venia legendi. As of 2023, Sahai's short bio at the World Academy of Art and Science still lists her as "Professor of Genetics, University of Heidelberg".

== See also ==
- Scientific misconduct
