= Bhargavi Davar =

Mental health activist in India

Bhargavi Davar was a noted mental health activist in India. She was managing trustee of The Bapu Trust, an organisation that was founded in 1999 dedicated to the research and activism of mental health issues. She has written numerous articles in medical journals.

== Bibliography ==
- Mental Health from a Gender Perspective (2001, SAGE Publications)
- Psychoanalysis as a Human Science: Beyond Foundationalism (1995, co-authored by Parameshwar R Bhat, SAGE Publications)
- Mental Health of Indian Women (1999, SAGE Publications)
- Depression and the Use of Natural Healing Methods (2007). In: Peter Stastny & Peter Lehmann (Eds.), Alternatives Beyond Psychiatry (pp. 83–90). Berlin / Eugene / Shrewsbury: Peter Lehmann Publishing. ISBN 978-0-9545428-1-8 (UK), ISBN 978-0-9788399-1-8 (USA). (E-Book in 2021.)
- Depressionen und die Anwendung natürlicher Heilmethoden (2007). In: Peter Lehmann / Peter Stastny (Eds.): Statt Psychiatrie 2, Berlin / Eugene / Shrewsbury: Antipsychiatrieverlag, S. 83–92. ISBN 978-3-925931-38-3 (E-Book in 2021)
- Shodh: Psychiatry pallikadill vatancha (2019), co-edited with Peter Lehmann & Peter Stastny), Pune: BAPU Trust for Research on Mind & Discourse, ISBN 978-81-941730-5-2
