= Gene Campaign =

Gene Campaign is a grassroots-level non-profit NGO in India, founded by Suman Sahai and a group of people concerned about food and livelihood security. Gene Campaign works in the field of bioresources, farmers' and community rights, intellectual property rights and indigenous knowledge, biopiracy, regulations of GMOs, and impact of climate change on agriculture and food. Sahai continues to be a member of the group. The group has been an outspoken critic of the Indian government's policies on genetically engineered organisms.
