= Sunset industry =

Industry in decline that has passed its peak or boom periods

A sunset industry is an industry in decline, one that has passed its peak or boom periods. As one example, analogue recording technologies for audio or video have been supplanted by digital equivalents; although analogue equipment is still offered, sales have declined dramatically and are not expected to recover, so this segment of the market has been branded a 'sunset industry'. Many countries try to protect domestic sunset industries as they still provide important employment. They use protectionist policies to slow down the decline whilst sunrise industries develop.

== See also ==
- Sunrise industry
- Primary sector of the economy
- Secondary sector of the economy
