= Shekhar Suman =

Indian actor (born 1962)

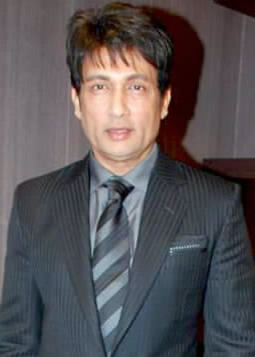
- Suman in 2010
- Born: 7 December 1962 (age 63); Patna, Bihar, India
- Occupations: Actor; politician; filmmaker; singer
- Years active: 1984–present
- Political party: Indian National Congress (2009–2012); Bharatiya Janata Party (2024–2024)
- Spouse: Alka Suman (m. 1983)
- Children: 2, including Adhyayan Suman

Shekhar Suman (born 7 December 1962) is an Indian actor, anchor, producer, director, and singer working in the Hindi cinema.

== Personal life ==
Shekhar Suman belongs to a Bihari Ambastha Kayastha family.

He married Alka Suman on 4 May 1983. Their younger son, Adhyayan Suman, is a Bollywood actor. Their elder son, Aayush, died of a heart ailment at age 11 on 3 April 1995.

== Career ==
=== Film actor ===
Suman debuted in films with Utsav opposite Rekha, produced by Shashi Kapoor and directed by Girish Karnad. He has worked in nearly 35 films including Manav Hatya, Naache Mayuri, Sansar, Anubhav, Tridev, Pati Parmeshwar, and Ranbhoomi.

=== Television ===
He made his television debut in 1984 with Wah Janaab in which he acted alongside Kiran Juneja. His television career included shows like Dekh Bhai Dekh, Reporter, Kabhi Idhar Kabhi Udhar, Chote Babu, Andaz, Amar Prem, Vilayati Babu, Movers n Shakers, Simply Shekhar and Carry On Shekhar. He hosted Film Deewane, The Great Indian Comedy Show on Star One until February 2006 and appeared in some episodes of Dial One Aur Jeeto on Sahara TV. He has also hosted quiz shows including Nilaam Ghar on Zee TV, He-Man on Star One and Poll Khol on STAR News. In 2015, he began hosting Abki Bari Shekhar Bihari on Aaj Tak.

He was one of the judges of The Great Indian Laughter Challenge along with Navjot Singh Sidhu, quitting after three seasons over differences with his co-host. He featured as a judge on several other comedy shows such as Comedy Circus on Sony TV and Comedy Superstar on SAB TV. He hosted the show Jab Khelo SAB Khelo on SAB TV and participated in the fourth season of the popular dance reality show, Jhalak Dikhhla Jaa which aired on Sony TV.

Since May 2026, he has started hosting the chat show Shekhar Tonite, which streams on YouTube.

=== Singer ===
He made his singing debut with a music album named, Kuch Khwaab Aise, a collection of eight love ballads whose music was composed by Aadesh Shrivastava and lyrics written by Shyam Raj. In December 2009, he appeared as a participant on the reality TV series, Raaz Pichhle Janam Ka, based on past life regression. Suman made his directorial debut with 2014 film, Heartless.

=== Politician ===
Suman fought Lok Sabha election in May 2009 from Patna Sahib on Congress ticket and lost to BJP's Shatrughan Sinha, coming up in third place.

On 5 May 2024, he joined Bharatiya Janata Party, and stated in an interview later in the month that he would 'opt-out' of the organisation if he was unable to serve. He claimed in June 2026 that he had left the party within 24 hours.

== Filmography ==
Year	Film	Role
2017	Bhoomi	Tripurari "Taj" Mishra
2014	Heartless	Doctor (also director)
2011	Chaloo	Police Sherkhan
2004	Ek Se Badhkar Ek	Anand Mathur
2002	Chor Machaaye Shor	Guru / Vyjayanti / Mala
1998	Ghar Bazar	
1994	Insaaf Apne Lahoo Se	Mohan Prasad
1993	Professor Ki Padosan	Photographer Vinod
1991	Ranbhoomi	Dr. Prakash
1989	Waqt Ke Zanjeer	
1989	Pati Parmeshwar	Vijay
1989	Anjaane Rishte	Anil
1989	Tridev	Journalist Shrikant Verma
1989	Tere Bina Kya Jeena	Amar
1988	Aakhri Nishchay	
1988	Insaaf Ki Manzil	Prakash
1988	Kharidaar	
1988	Woh Phir Aayegi	CID Inspector Ratan
1988	Razia	
1987	Sansar	Peter Fernandes
1987	Yaatna	
1986	Anubhav	Ramesh
1986	Naache Mayuri	
1986	Poojaku Panikiraani Puvvu	Telugu film
1986	Manav Hatya	
1985	Rehguzar	Shekhar
1984	Utsav	Charudutt

=== Television ===
Year	Title	Role
1984	Wah Janaab	
1993-1994	Dekh Bhai Dekh	Sameer Diwan
1994-1995	Reporter	
1995	Andaz	Anand
1996	Kabhi Idhar Kabhi Udhar	
1996	Ek Raja Ek Rani	Ajay Kapoor
1996-1997	Amar Prem	
1997-2012	Movers & Shakers	Host
1998	Dam Dama Dam	Sarju/Chichi/Sonu/Karan
1998	Wilaytee Babu	Shanty
1998-1999	Jaal	
1999	Hera Pheri	Ajay Premi
1999	Main	Viren Kumar
2000	Made in India	Host
2001	Nilaam Ghar	Host
2001	Simply Shekhar	Host
2004	The Great Indian Comedy Show	Host
2004	He Man	Host
2004-2009	Poll Khol	Host
2005-2007	The Great Indian Laughter Challenge	Judge
2007-2008	Jjhoom India	Contestant
2008-2010	Comedy Circus	Judge
2009	Tedhi Baat Shekhar Ke Saath	Various characters
2012	Laugh India Laugh	Judge
2015	Comedy Superstar	Judge
2018	Saat Pheron Ki Hera Pherie	Bhoopi Tandon
2022	India's Laughter Champion	Judge
2022-2023	Bigg Boss 16	Big Bulletin Host
2024	Heeramandi	Zulfikar
2026	Shekhar Tonite	Host
2026	The Pyramid Scheme	Tarun Bajaj

== Awards ==
- Won Best Anchor for Movers And Shakers at 1st ITA Awards
- Won Best Anchor for Carry on Shekhar at 3rd Indian Telly Awards
- Won Bollywood Movie Award for Best Comedian, Chor Machaaye Shor
