= Nawal Kishore Press =

Indian book publishing firm founded by Munshi Nawal Kishore

- Founded: 1858
- Founder: Munshi Nawal Kishore
- Successor: Ram Kumar Book Depot; Tej Kumar Book Depot
- Country of origin: India
- Headquarters location: Lucknow

The Nawal Kishore Press (also spelled Newal Kishore Press) was a publishing house founded by Munshi Nawal Kishore in Lucknow, British India, in 1858. It grew rapidly between 1865 and 1872 from its modest beginnings as a small printing press, adopting modern technology and improved marketing, and engaging in innovative print ventures. The Press began to decline after 1890, when Nawal Kishore's successor was unable to keep up his legacy.

The Nawal Kishore Press published books in Urdu, Arabic, Persian, and Hindi on a variety of subjects, including: religion, ethics, literature, medicine, and history.

== History ==
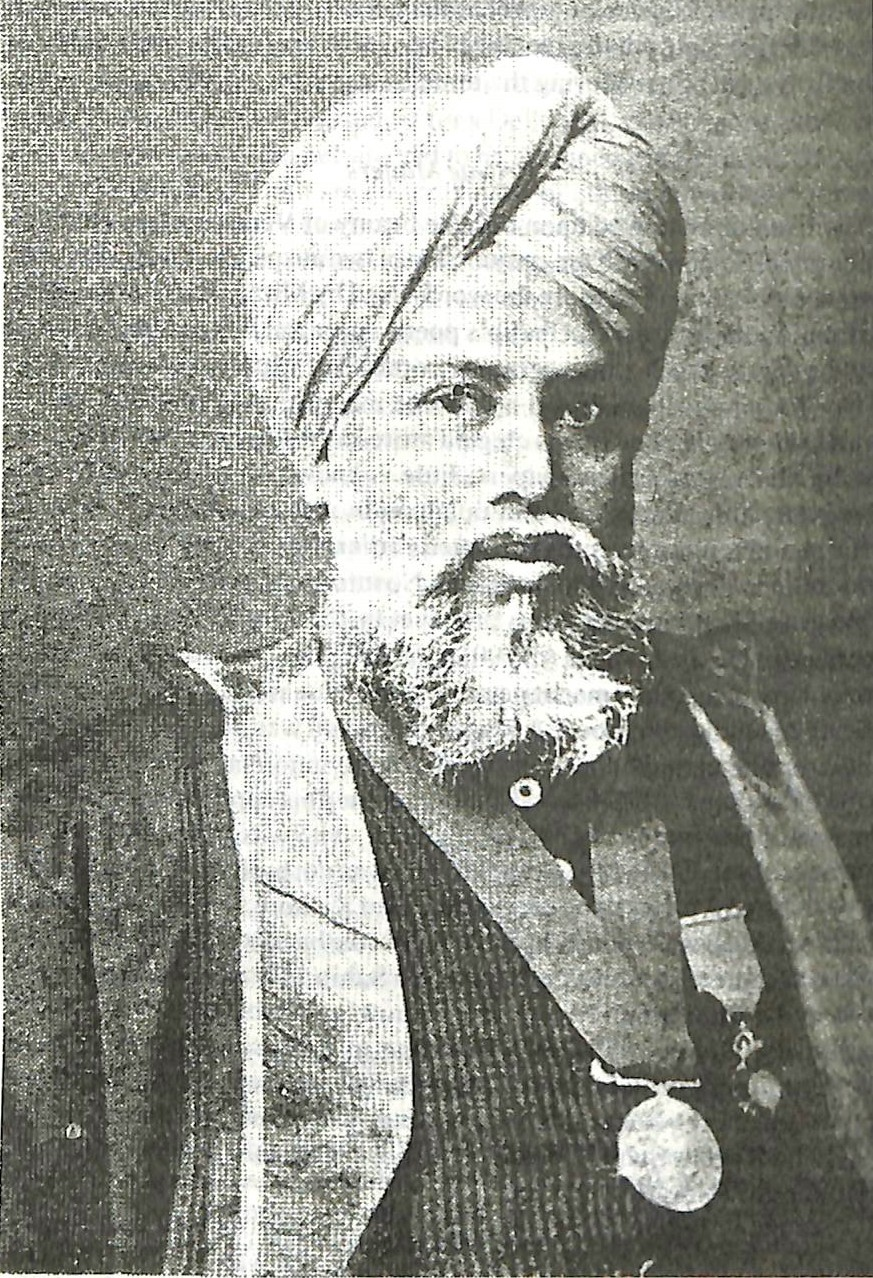
Munshi Nawal Kishore (1836–1895)

Munshi Nawal Kishore was associated with the Agra-based Koh-i-Noor Press from 1853 to 1857, and briefly served as an assistant editor and editor of Koh-i-Noor, a Koh-i-Noor Press magazine owned by Munshi Harsukh Roy. When he was 22, Nawal Kishore moved to Lucknow to found his own business. On 23 November 1858, he opened a small printing press with official approval from Robert Montgomery, then Chief Commissioner of Oudh.

From 1865 to 1872, the Nawal Kishore Press grew quickly, adopting modern technology, implementing better marketing practices, and undertaking innovative print ventures. Nawal Kishore's successor was unable to keep up his legacy, and the Press began to decline after 1890.

When Nawal Kishore died in 1895, his adopted son, Munshi Prag Narayan Bhargav (1872–1926), took over management of the publishing house. Following Prag Narayan's death, the ownership of the publishing house passed to his son, Bishan Narayan (1898–1931). Soon afterwards, Bishan Narayan left the Press to his own two sons, Munshi Ram Kumar Bhargav (1915–1971) and Munshi Tej Kumar Bhargav (1919–1987). In 1950, following a rift between the brothers, the firm was divided into two separate book publishers, renamed the Ram Kumar Book Depot and the Tej Kumar Book Depot.

== Publications ==
The Nawal Kishore Press played an instrumental role in promoting literature. It contributed to the preservation and dissemination of Islamic religious texts, Unani medicine, works on Indo-Muslim historiography, and the traditional Persian and Urdu qissa and dastan narrative forms. The Press also published, and produced translations of Sanskrit texts, and promoted the Puranas (Hindu religious texts) in Hindi and Urdu.

Through its newspaper Avadh Akhbar, initially published weekly, the Nawal Kishore Press also contributed to Urdu journalism. In 1877, Avadh Akhbar became the first daily Urdu-language newspaper in northern India. The paper became popular, and achieved commercial success through efficient editing and professional management techniques. The Press also published other newspapers and journals.

Over almost a century, the Nawal Kishore Press published some 12,000 titles. Approximately 5000 of these were issued during Nawal Kishore's lifetime; 3000 under Prag Narayan; and 2000 each, respectively, in the era of Bishan Narayan then of his two sons.

== Reception ==
Scholar Ulrike Stark comments that the Nawal Kishore Press played a pivotal role in the diffusion of Hindi literature during the latter half of the nineteenth century, as one of the first private Indian publishing houses to engage in the mass publication of printed books in Hindi.
