= Munshi Nawal Kishore =

Indian publisher and editor (1836–1895)

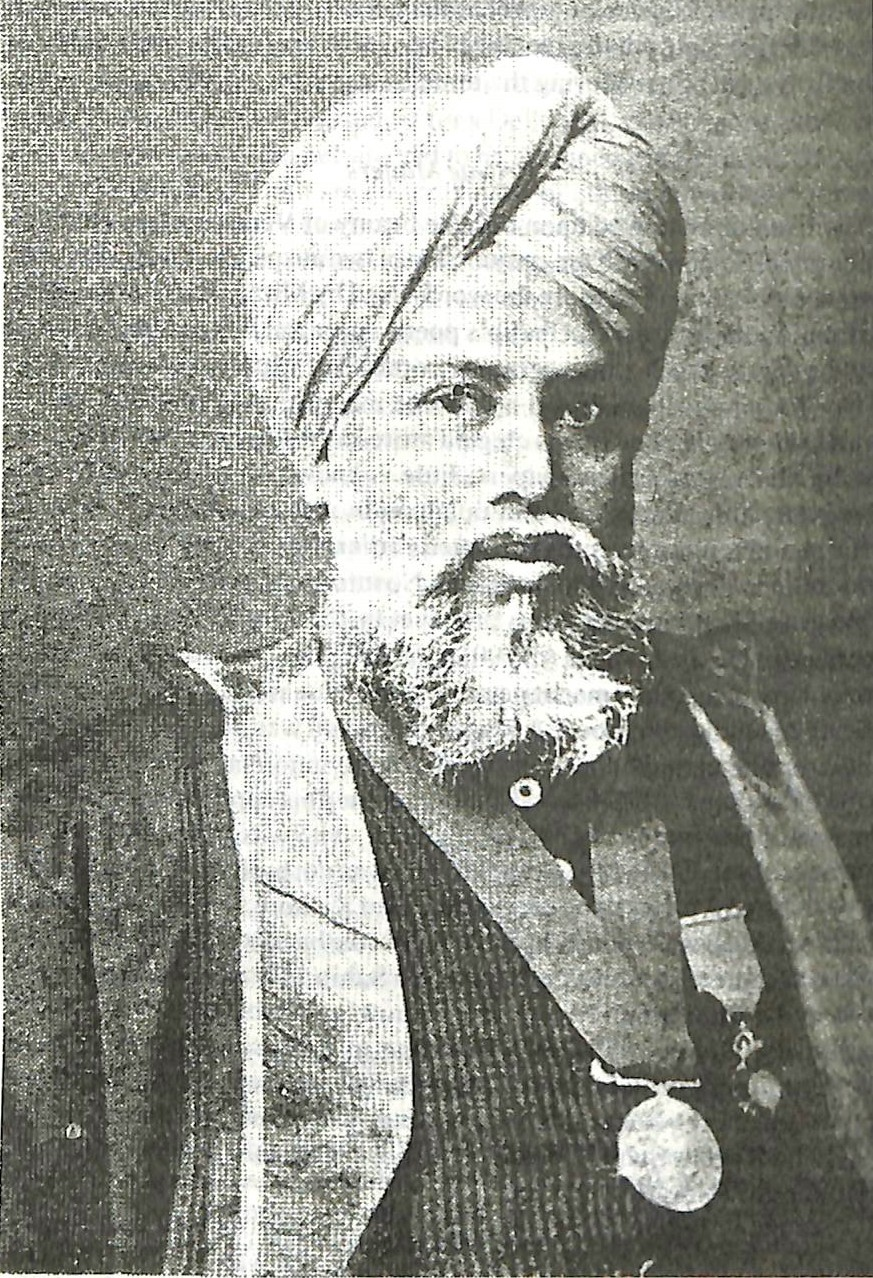
- Born: 3 January 1836
- Died: 19 February 1895 (aged 59)
- Occupations: Book publisher, magazine editor
- Known for: Nawal Kishore Press

Munshi Nawal Kishore (3 January 1836 – 19 February 1895) was a book publisher from India. He has been called Caxton of India. In 1858, at the age of 22, he founded the Nawal Kishore Press at Lucknow. This institution today is the oldest printing and publishing concern in Asia.

== Biography ==
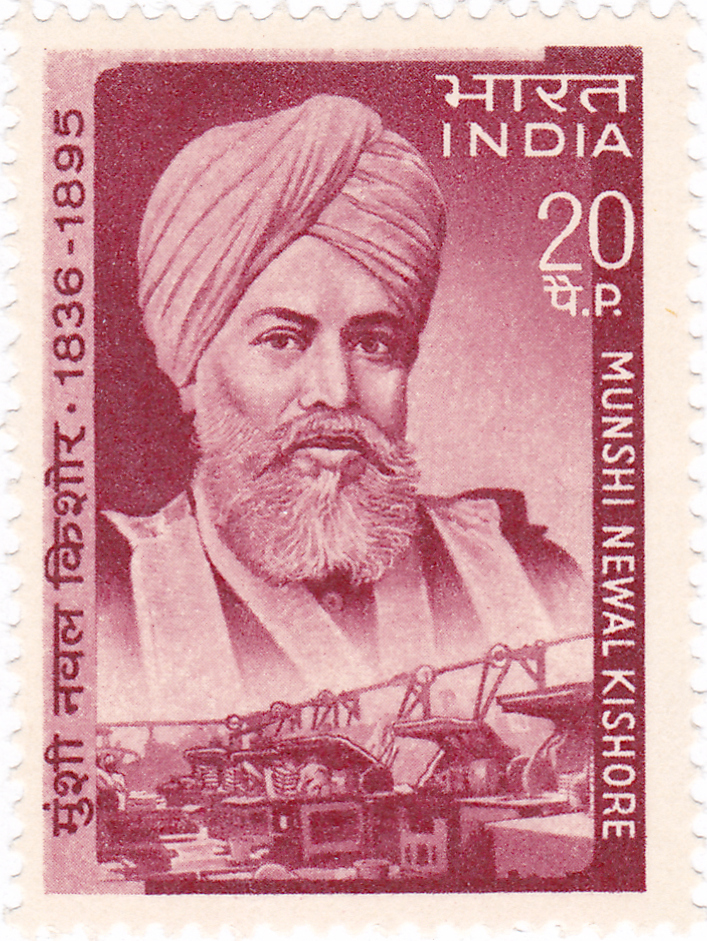
Munshi Nawal Kishore on a 1970 stamp of India

Munshi Nawal Kishore was the second son of Brahmin Munshi Jamuna Prasad Bhargava, a Zamindar of Aligarh, and was born on 3 January 1836. At the age of six, he was admitted to a local school (maktab) to learn Arabic and Persian. At the age of 10, he was admitted to Agra College, but he never completed his education there for unknown reasons. During this time, he developed his interest in journalistic writing, and issued a short-lived weekly paper Safeer-e-Agra. He briefly served as an assistant editor and editor of Koh-i-Noor, a magazine of Koh-i-Noor Press owned by Munshi Harsukh Roy.

On 23 November 1858, he founded a printing press known as Munshi Nawal Kishor Press. From 1859, he started publishing weekly newspaper Avadh Akhbar, also known as Oudh Akhbar.

He died on 19 February 1895 in Lucknow. His body was cremated in Kanpur. The Government of India issued a postage stamp in his honour in 1970.

Munshi Nawal Kishore published more than 5000 books in Arabic, Bengali, Hindi, English, Marathi, Punjabi, Pashto, Persian, Sanskrit and Urdu during 1858–1885. The Ram Kumar Press and Tej Kumar Press, started by his sons, are successors to the Nawal Kishore Press.

Munshi was a member of the Indian National Congress.
