= Tulsidas (poem) =

Hindi poem by Suryakant Tripathi 'Nirala'

- Author: Suryakant Tripathi 'Nirala'
- Original title: तुलसीदास
- Language: Hindi
- Genre: Poem
- Publication date: 1935
- Publication place: India
- Media type: Print

Tulsidas is a long poem (khandakavya) in Hindi written by Suryakant Tripathi 'Nirala'. It is based on an episode of the life of the medieval bhakti poet-saint of the same name. Originally written in 1934, the work was first published in 1935 in the Hindi magazine Sudha and later released as a separate edition in 1939.

== Background ==
After his marriage to Manohara Devi, Nirala developed a strong interest in Hindi and Hindi literature, particularly influenced by Manohara Devi's singing of verses from the Ramcharitmanas. This inspired him to study Hindi grammar and literature more deeply. Over time, his Advaita beliefs, devotion to Tulsidas, and the growth of mysticism and romanticism during the onset of Chhayavad converged to shape this poem.

The poem's narrative is brief, with a strong philosophical undertone and message. It is primarily based on the folklore that when Tulsidas found that his wife, Ratnavali, went to her father's home, he swam across the Sarayu river to reunite with his wife. This portion accounts for the poem's central focus. The beginning and end of the poem are rich in emotional and cultural landscapes, capturing the highs and lows of Tulsidas's mind, his devotion, and his connection to his motherland.

Nirala called Tulsidas "the most fragrant branch of flowers in the garden of the world's poetry, blossoming in the creeper of Hindi". He considered Tulsidas in the same league as Valmiki, Vyasa, Kalidasa, Homer, Johann Wolfgang von Goethe and William Shakespeare.

== Summary ==
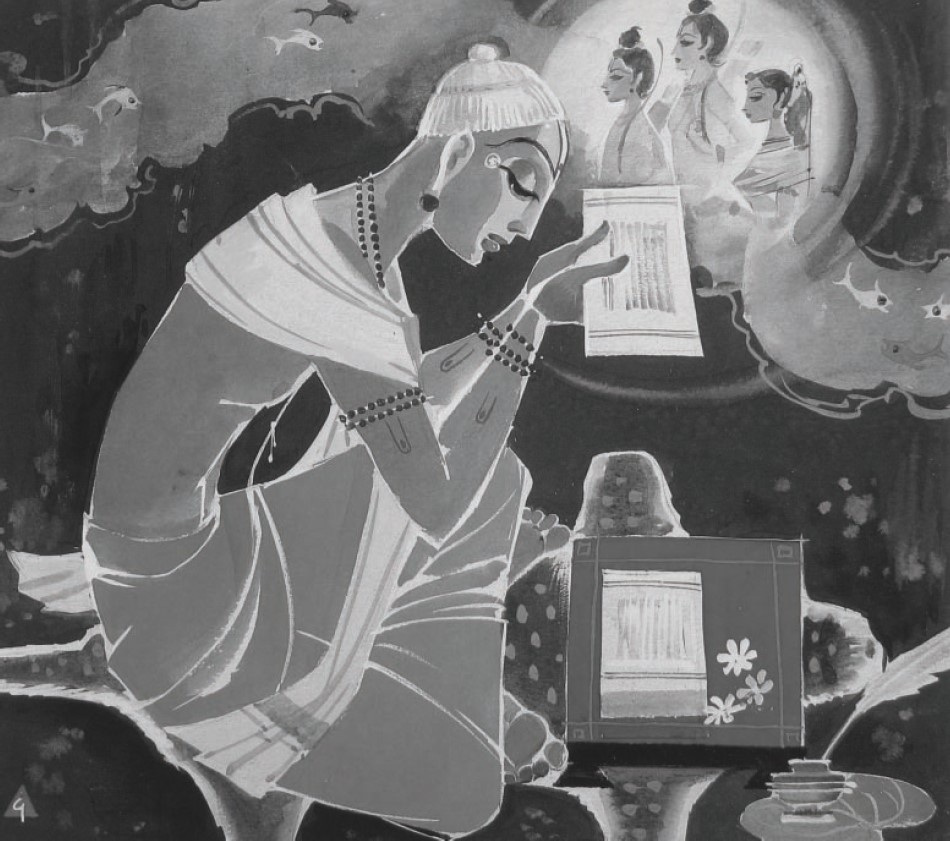
Artistic depiction of Tulsidas

The poem starts with a description of the Muslim invasions in India. The poet describes it as the rising of the moon of Muslim culture with the sunset of Hindu culture. In the cool light of this new culture, Tulsidas was born.

One day, while visiting Chitrakoot with his friends, Tulsidas was struck by the lifeless sight of nature because of the absence of the touch of consciousness. Thence, he received a message from nature to move from the inanimate to the conscious. He became aware of the illusion that had concealed the truth and he realized that India's civilization was trapped. Tulsidas's soul became restless to destroy this ignorance, but at that moment, he saw a vision of his wife, Ratnavali, in the sky.

All of nature seemed to him to be imbued with his wife's beauty. He immediately set out seeking his wife. His sudden arrival at his-laws house resented her. In a fit of emotion Ratnavali chided him and remarked that if he was even half as devoted to Rama as he was to her body of flesh and blood, he would have been redeemed. At this point, Tulsidas viewed that Sarasvati was incarnated in the form of his wife in order to guide his path. Ratnavali realized at that moment that this separation would be permanent. Her eyes filled with tears, but it was impossible for Tulsidas to turn back.

== Analyses ==
"There are hundreds of poems in Hindi that prioritize storytelling, but this is unique among those that are written based on psychological principles."

— Ram Vilas Sharma

Ram Vilas Sharma, a prominent literary critic, observes that the poet's artistic realm is groundbreaking. According to him, Nirala has innovated in the field of mysticism by presenting it in a narrative format The poet's primary objective is to illuminate psychological truths, necessitating the creation of a unique linguistic style. The vigor of both his language and his poetic meter is truly exceptional.

Namvar Singh posits that Nirala has skillfully depicted a full-fledged emergence of the spirit of independence within. Through the character of Tulsidas, Nirala has traced the origin and development of the modern poet's sentiments concerning independence. Similar to Chhayavadi poets, Nirala's Tulsidas becomes acutely aware of his country's subjugation while studying nature. He temporarily forgets this sentiment due to his attachment to his wife. Ultimately, the knowledge gained in the school of nature is reinforced in the university of the same woman. In this manner, through the life story of the greatest national poet of the Hindi community, Nirala has suggested a path to navigate the challenges of the contemporary era.

The poem depicts the struggles of Tulsidas with the same vigor with which it concludes in a joy that cannot be contained within the heart, be it Indian or universal.

== See also ==
- Chhayavad
- Hindi literature
- Ram Ki Shakti Puja
- Symbolism of Rama
