= Chhayavad =

Era of Neo-romanticism in Hindi literature

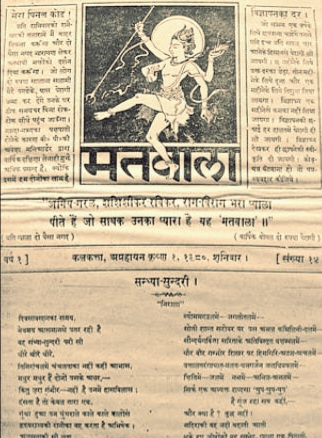
The first issue of Matvala, a notable magazine that played a significant role in the development of Chāyāvād.

Chhayavad (ISO: Chāyāvād) refers to the era of mystical-romanticism in Hindi literature, particularly poetry, spanning approximately from mid-1910s to early-1940s. It emerged as a reaction to the didacticism of its previous poetic movement - the Dwivedi era - as well as the courtly traditions of poetry.

== Etymology ==
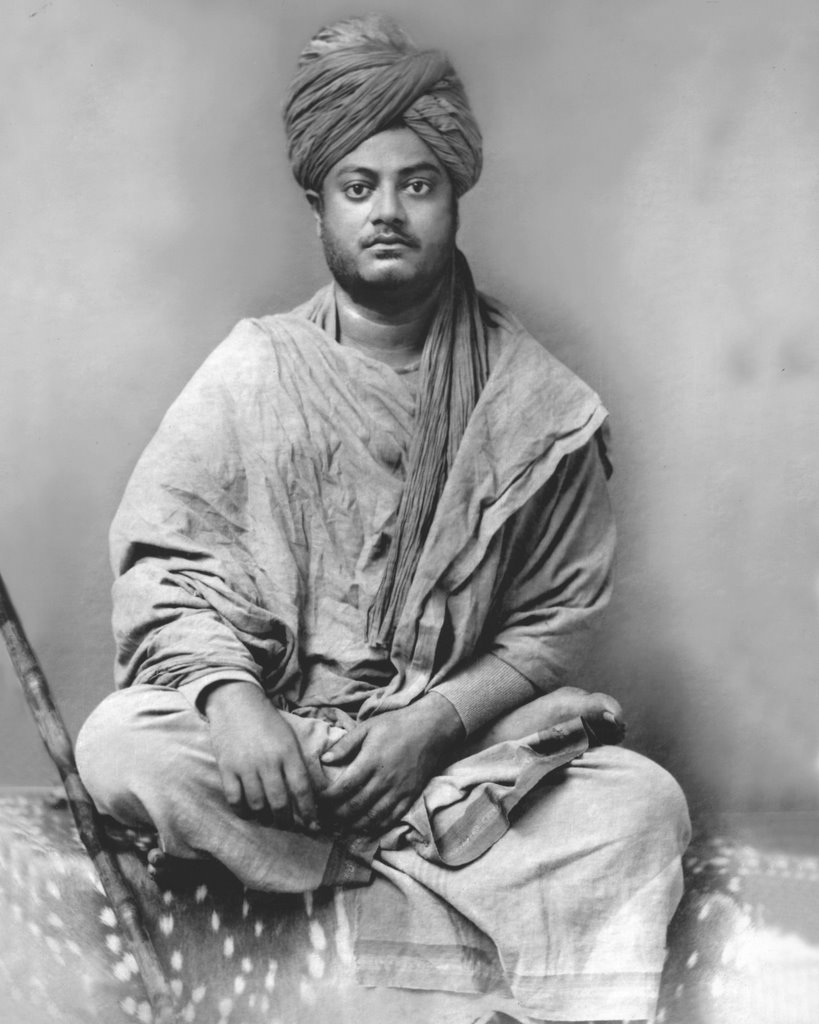
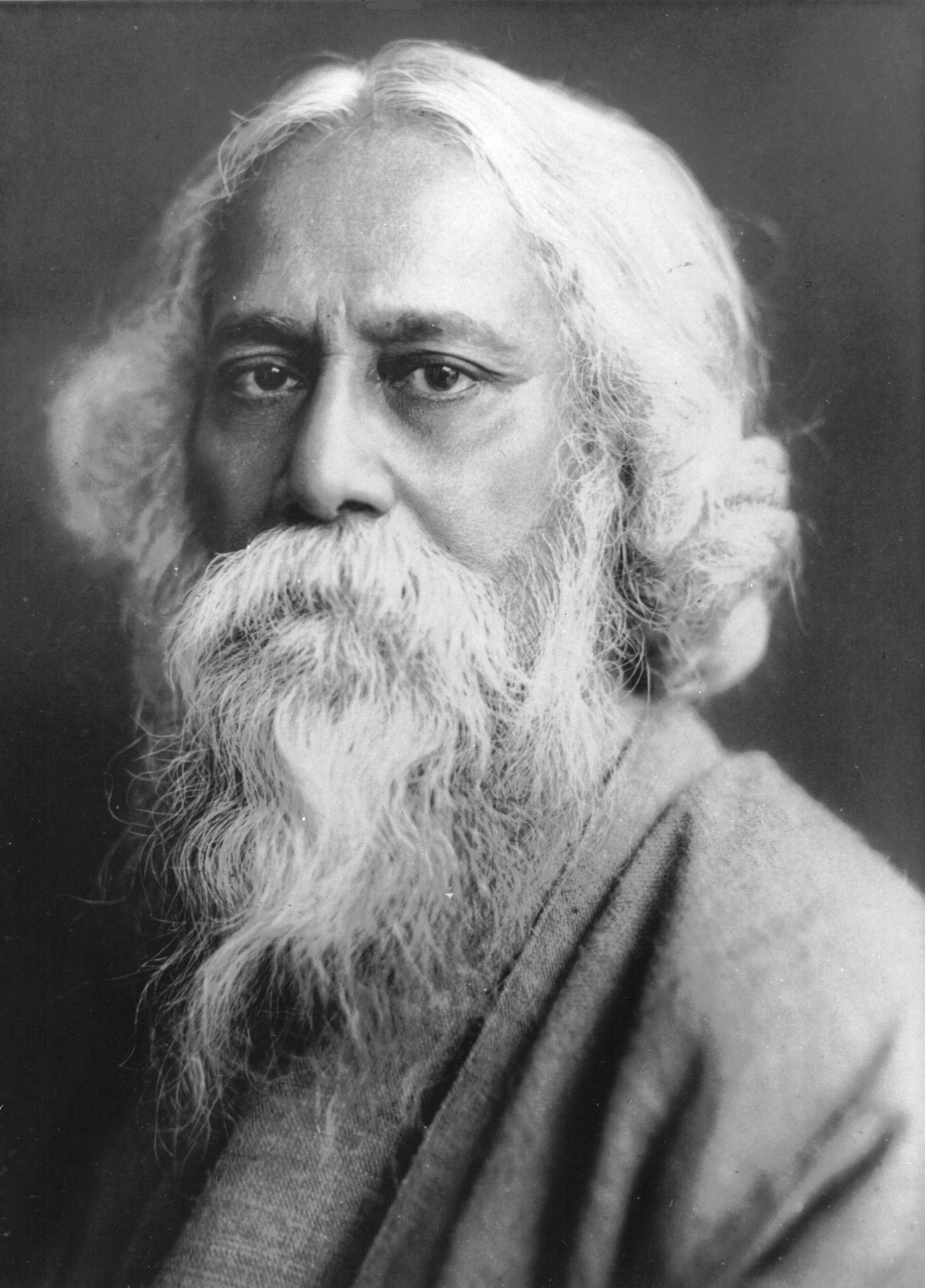
Swami Vivekananda and Rabindranath Tagore, both of whom exerted a strong influence on the Chhayavad literary movement.

The literal meaning of chāyā carries various interpretations, including shade, such as from a tree or cloud; reflection, like that in a mirror; and shadow, as cast by an object. The suffix vād is the Hindi equivalent of the English suffix -ism.

The term chāyā appears in the Upanishads, where it refers to the universe as a phenomenal reflection of transcendental reality. This interpretation is supported by the broader intellectual environment of that time, when figures like Vivekananda and Rabindranath Tagore were revisiting the Upanishads and introducing modern interpretations of ancient texts.

Researchers have also proposed that the term is associated with the reflection of the literary expression exemplified in Tagore's Gitanjali which itself was influenced by Romanticism of English literature.

The first use of the term chāyāvād in the context of Hindi poetry is attributed to Mukutdhar Pandey, who introduced it through his collection of essays in 1920. Namvar Singh notes that the essays were presented with annotations, suggesting that commentaries on this poetic style already existed. Scholars agree that the essence of chāyāvād' began to take shape around the mid-1910s, predating its formal recognition in 1920.

== Historical Context ==
=== Development ===
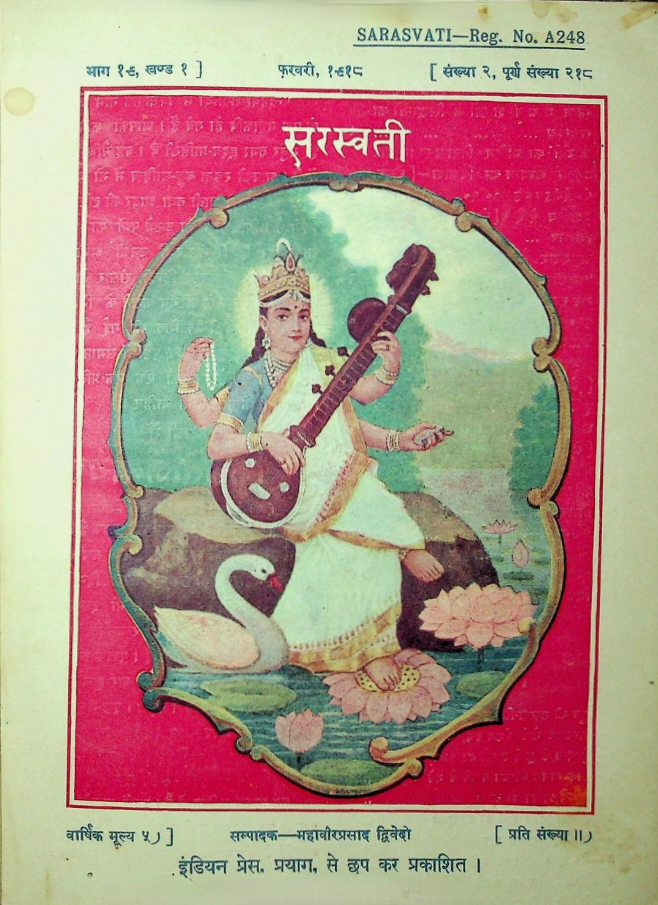
Cover of Sarasvatī, an influential magazine started during the Dwivedi period

Until the early 20th century, Hindi poetry followed traditions that had developed over several centuries through various medieval literary forms and dialects. The first attempts at modern standardized Hindi poetry, based on Khari Boli, emerged during a surge of literary activity in Varanasi in the 1860s, centered around Bharatendu Harishchandra. It was primarily characterized by bhakti (religious devotion) or riti (courtly love) themes. The Bhartendu yug introduced innovations, such as using verses in Braj Bhasha for dramas to comment on contemporary issues, but these did not gain lasting traction.

A significant shift in Hindi poetry occurred with the founding of the magazine Sarasvatī in 1900, under the editorship of Mahavir Prasad Dwivedi. While initially appreciated more for its social and literary goals than for its aesthetic value, the Dwivedi yug marked a transformation in the content of Hindi poetry. Poets of this era moved away from the limited scope of rītī poetry and began addressing themes such as nationalism and social reform. A defining work of this period is Maithilisharan Gupt's 1912 poem Bhārat-Bhāratī, which exemplifies the nationalist sentiment of the time. Dwivedi-era introduced didactic themes that shaped the discourse of Hindi literature through the second and third decades of the 20th century.

Simultaneously, a younger generation of poets emerged on the fringes of the literary establishment, rejecting both the ideal prosaic moral earnestness of Dwivedi-era poetry and the narrow scope of rītī traditions. Their reaction against earlier styles and themes led to a revolution in poetic sensibility, ultimately giving rise to the Chhayavad yug.

=== Period ===
The Chāyāvād period is generally dated between 1918 and 1938, though some critics and scholars propose slight variations for its inception and conclusion. This period of literary flourishing coincided with the aftermath of World War I, and extended through the interwar years, culminating in the early 1940s as World War II commenced. Hence, this poetic stream aligns with global trends of introspection, and cultural revival in post-war societies. The Chāyāvād era also coincided with India's escalating struggle for independence, intertwining personal emotions with the collective aspirations for cultural identity and an implicit desire for political independence.

== Definition ==
=== By critics ===
Prominent critic Ramchandra Shukla in his Hindi Sahitya ka Itihas asserts that:

Chāyāvād should be understood in two senses. First, in the context of mysticism, where it relates to the subject matter of poetry, depicting the poet's eternal and unknown beloved through highly imaginative language. Second, as a particular poetic style, where the focus lies in expressing the unmanifest through the shadow of the manifest. Chhayavad generally represents an artistic response against the dry, narrative style of the Dwivedi era. (English translation)

Hazari Prasad Dwivedi asserted that Chāyāvād stemmed from an inward orientation of the mind and a steadfast belief in the changing human condition. The poets of this era were endowed with exceptional sensitivity and keen awareness of social disparities and discord. Stylistically, they were markedly distinct from their predecessors, focusing primarily on subjectivity. By 1920, Khadi Boli poetry still emphasized themes, but subsequently, the poet's own emotions and sentiments took precedence. The significance of the theme itself became secondary, while the poet's inner resonance with it became paramount.

Namwar Singh wrote:

Regardless of its literal meaning, the term chāyāvād practically refers to the collected works of poets like Prasad, Nirala, Pant, and Mahadevi written between 1918 and 1936. It is the poetic manifestation of the national awakening of that era, striving to break free from old traditions on one hand and foreign domination on the other. (English translation)

Nand Dulare Bajpai defined Chāyāvād as the subtle yet manifest beauty of nature imbued with a spiritual aura, offering a universally accepted explanation of the movement.

=== By the contributing poets ===
Jaishankar Prasad noted that this new form of poetry relied more on Indian aesthetics of experience and expression. Its distinctive features included suggestiveness, figurativeness, the depiction of nature, and the nuanced articulation of personal emotions. He said:

When poetry moved away from the mythological narratives or external descriptions of women’s beauty in different lands and began expressing self-experienced emotions rooted in pain, it came to be termed Chāyāvād in Hindi.

Mahadevi Varma viewed the philosophy of Chhayavad as rooted in universalism (sarvātmavād) and identified nature as its medium. She believed this poetry established a profound emotional bond with nature, evoking universal empathy and unity with all elements of the world. She regarded mysticism as a natural progression of Chāyāvād.

Sumitranandan Pant, in a distinctly poetic manner, observed that the spontaneous emergence of poetic sensibilities from diverse directions eventually coalesced into the epoch-defining Chhayavad.

== Notable authors ==
Jaishankar Prasad, Suryakant Tripathi 'Nirala', Sumitranandan Pant and Mahadevi Varma are considered as the four pillars of the Chhayavadi school of Hindi literature.

=== Jaishankar Prasad ===
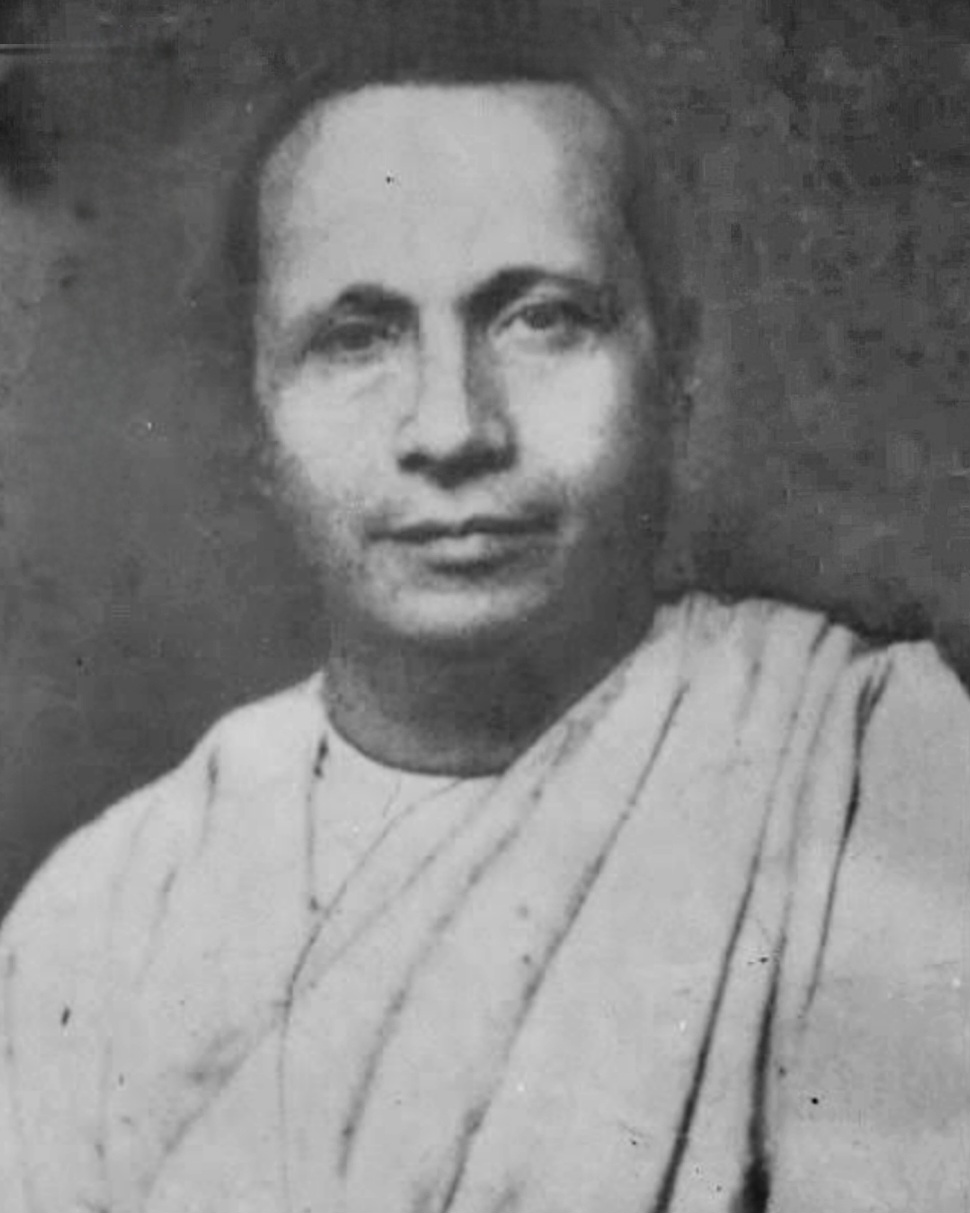
Prasad

Prasad was born in 1889 in Varanasi into a prosperous family with a strong association to Shaivism. His family's enterprise was focused on the trade of snuff and tobacco. His early education began at home, studying Sanskrit, Hindi, Persian, and Urdu, before he got enrolled at Queen's College.

He had a deep interest in religion, history, archaeology, and gardening. Music was a lifelong inclination, and he appreciated both classical forms and lighter styles. His works often include love in its diverse forms, the profound exploration of pain and anguish, the complexities of the human condition, the pursuit of spiritual ideals, and the examination of historical and mythological narratives—elements that are evident in both his poetry and prose.

=== Suryakant Tripathi 'Nirala' ===
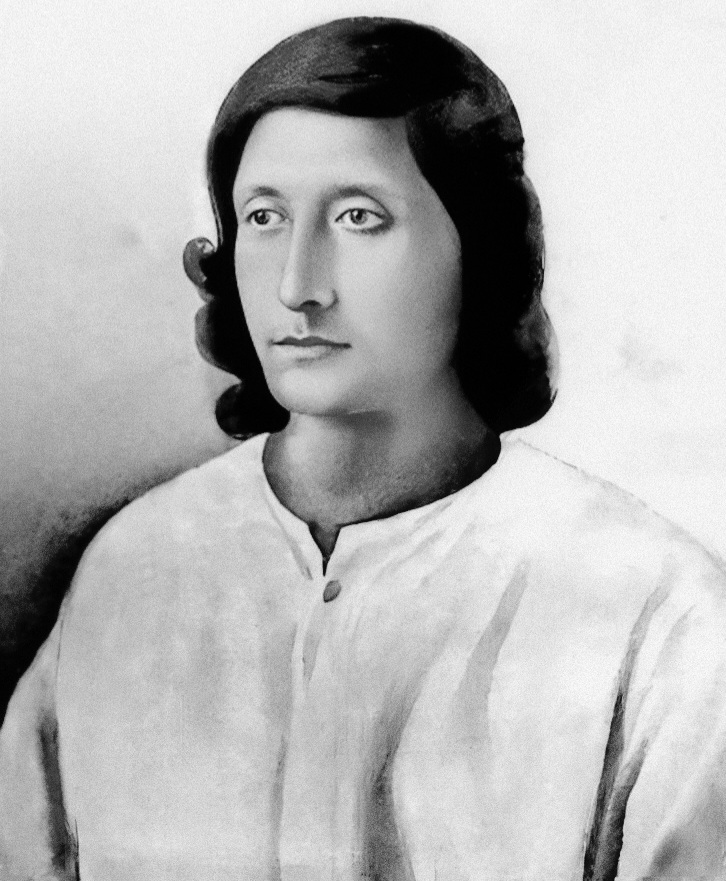
Nirala

Nirala was born towards the end of the 19th century at Mahishadal in Midnapore in Bengal Presidency. He independently started deciphering the grammar of modern standard Hindi by studying two Hindi journals available to him in Bengal: Sarasvatī and Maryādā.

He revolutionized Hindi poetry by pioneering the use of free verse. Nirala's poetry illustrated a profound connection with the living spirits of nature. His mystical poems, rich with the devotion of medieval Bhakti poetry, explored nature within a metaphysical framework that aligned with his Advaita beliefs. Themes of minority subjectivity, social critique, and social upliftment also appeared frequently in his writings.

=== Sumitranandan Pant ===
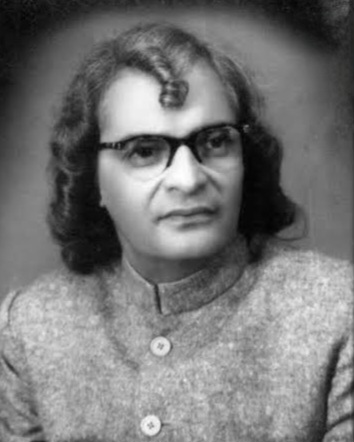
Pant

Pant was born in Kausani in 1900. He grew up in a village and always cherished a love for the beauty and flavor of rural India, which is reflected in all his major works. He was known for romanticism in his poems which were inspired by nature, people and beauty within.

His works showcase a blend of innovation and emotional depth, marked by free verse and prose poems. Renowned for his vivid imagery, rhythmic variety, and charm, his contributions extend beyond poetry, highlighting his brilliance as a prose stylist, essayist, and critic.

=== Mahadevi Varma ===
Verma was born on 26 March 1907 in Farrukhabad, Uttar Pradesh. She significantly impacted Hindi literature by refining the language and infusing poetry with heartfelt acceptance of Indian philosophy.

Her unique blend of emotional intensity, lyrical simplicity, and evocative imagery, along with her contributions as a translator and scholar, solidified her position as a leading figure of the Chhayavad movement. Her poetry, along with her work towards social upliftment and women's education, were depicted in her writings. These works greatly influenced both readers and critics.

=== Others ===
Other important figures of this literary movement were

Ramdhari Singh 'Dinkar', widely regarded as a poet of rebellion, with his poetry often exuding heroic sentiment, he initially composed in the Chāyāvād style and is frequently cited as a major figure of the Chāyāvādottar period—the transitional phase between Chāyāvād and Uttar-Chāyāvād (Post-Chāyāvāda). His later work, based on the celestial nymph Urvashi, also embodies the sensibilities of Chāyāvād.

Harivansh Rai Bachchan began his literary career under the influence of Chāyāvāda and gradually emerged as a prominent poet and writer of the Nayī Kavitā literary movement. In the later stages of his career, he became increasingly critical of Chāyāvād and became associated with other literary currents such as Pragativād.

Makhanlal Chaturvedi was an Indian poet, essayist, and journalist noted for his role in the Indian independence movement and his contribution to Chāyāvād. He received the first Sahitya Akademi Award in Hindi for Him Taraṅginī (1955).

Ramkumar Verma, known for his historical one-act plays and poetry collections. His works reflect themes of sacrifice, love, service, and humanity, influenced by Gandhian ideals.

Pandit Narendra Sharma started his career as a poet and towards the 1940s, he contributed lyrics to Hindi cinema and is widely recognized for his work in the film industry.

== Notable works ==
Many works from this school of poetry first appeared in literary magazines before being compiled into books. The following list includes major works in their book form, excluding separate magazine publications since they were later incorporated into these volumes.

=== Jaishankar Prasad ===
- Jharna (1918)
- Chitradhar (1918)
- Aansu (1925)
- Kanan Kusum (1929)
- Lahar (1935)
- Kamayani (1936)

=== Suryakant Tripathi 'Nirala' ===
- Parimal (1930)
- Tulsidas (1935)
- Geetika (1936)
- Anamika (1939) — notable for the inclusion of two extended poetic works, Ram Ki Shakti Puja and Saroj Smriti.
- Anima (1943)

=== Sumitranandan Pant ===
- Veena (1927)
- Gunjan (1932)
- Pallav (1936)
- Yugvani (1937)

=== Mahadevi Varma ===
- Nihar (1930)
- Rashmi (1932)
- Neerja (1933)
- Sandhyageet (1936)
- Yāmā (1939) — the prior four works were brought together in one volume.
- Deepshikha (1942)
- Agnirekha (1990) — originally composed during this stylistic period and published posthumously.

=== Harivansh Rai Bachchan ===
- Tera haar (1929)
- Nisha Nimantran (1938)

== See also ==
- Symbolism
- List of Hindi poets
- Irish Literary Revival
- Nagari Pracharini Sabha
