= Ram Ki Shakti Puja =

Hindi poem by Suryakant Tripathi 'Nirala'

- Author: Suryakant Tripathi 'Nirala'
- Original title: राम की शक्ति-पूजा
- Language: Hindi
- Genre: Poem
- Publication date: 1937
- Publication place: India
- Media type: Print

Ram Ki Shakti Puja (ISO: Rām kī Śakti Pūjā lit. 'Rama's worship of Shakti') is a poem in Hindi by Suryakant Tripathi 'Nirala'. It was published in 1937 in the second edition of Nirala's poetry collection Anamika. This long poem consists of 312 lines composed in Nirala's tailored poetic meter, Shakti Puja - a rhyming meter of twenty-four syllables. This poem is regarded as one of the finest works in Nirala's oeuvre. Numerous commentaries, analyses, and explanations attest to its established literary significance.

== Background ==
The plot draws inspiration from an episode of the Ramayana, with a notable influence from the Krittivasa's Ramayana over other versions of the story. Nirala's adaptation features significant poetic and narrative differences from the Krittivasi Ramayana. The poet's rendition of the tale incorporates multiple layers of meaning, offering a modern perspective. Additionally, the poet presents an impressive portrayal of contemporary consciousness and the psychological landscape of self-struggle.

== Synopsis ==
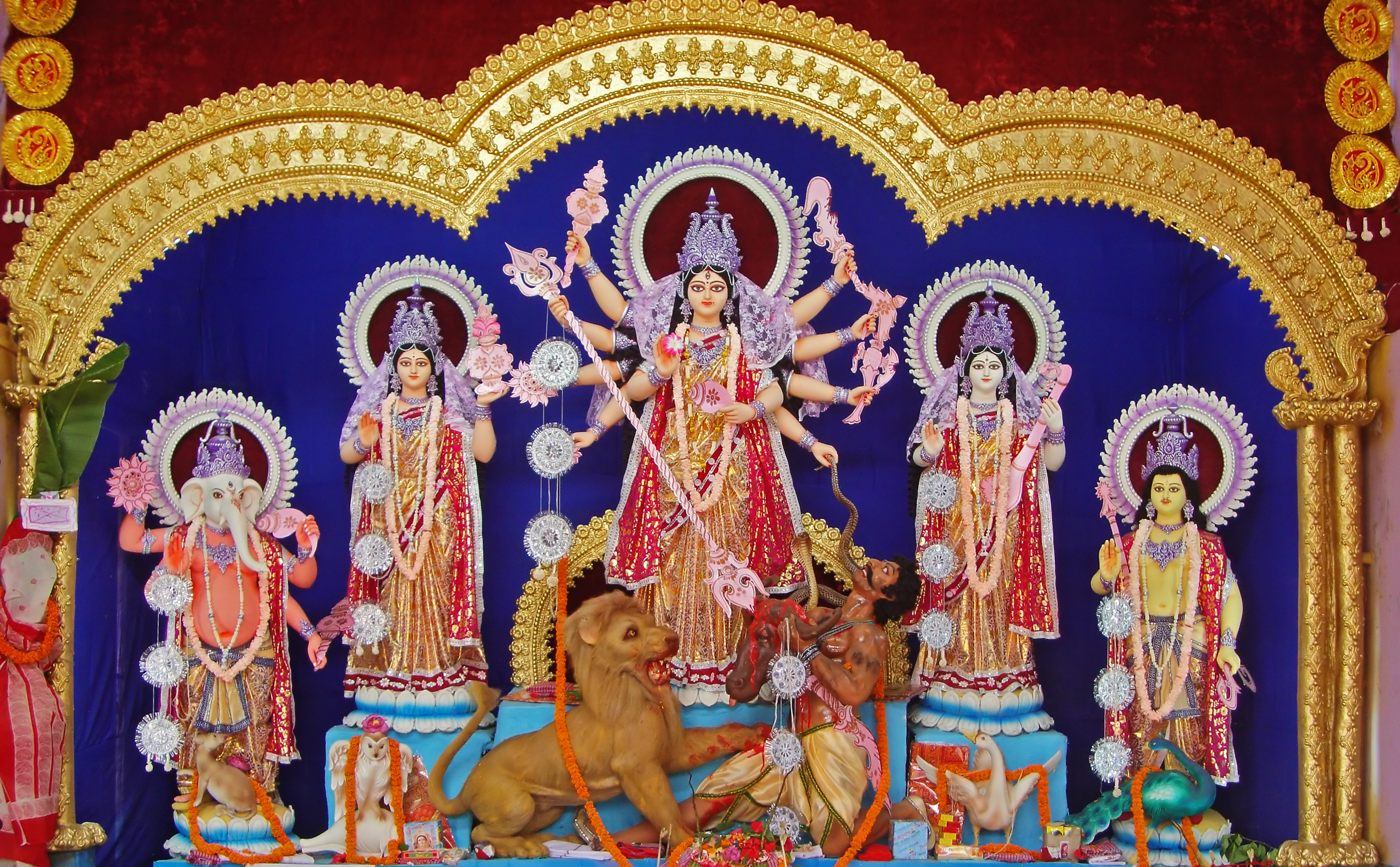
The iconic representation of Shakti Puja illustrated in the poem Rama saw—before him, the radiant form of Durga, With her left foot on Mahishsura, right poised on the lion. A luminous presence, adorned with ten weapons in hand, With a gentle smile that made the world's glory timid, Eastwards Lakshmi, and Saraswati on the west, To the right Ganesh, Kartikeya with battle's cadence on the left Shiva's presence crowned her. With reverence on her lotus feet, Raghava bowed with a soft respectful greet. — translated from the original Hindi

The poem starts with the aftermath of the intense battle between Rama and the demon king Ravana. As evening falls, weary warriors return to their camps, reflecting on the day's fierce fighting.

Rama, while resolute in his purpose, experiences a moment of vulnerability as he ponders the upcoming battle and his beloved Sita. In the midst of darkness, his mind drifts to recollections of Sita, which fortify his determination and inspire him to strengthen his resolve to rescue her.

Hanuman, devoted to Rama, notices tears in Rama's eyes. This realization awakens Hanuman's immense power, leading to confusion untilShiva explains Hanuman's eternal servitude to Rama. Parvati, in the form of Hanuman's mother, reminds him of his true purpose, bringing him back to his dharma.

Vibhishana expresses concern over Rama's emotional state, urging focus and strength. Rama, acknowledging the formidable power of Ravana and his own commitment to righteousness, heeds Jambavan's advice to seek divine support through prayer.

Rama instructs Hanuman to gather 108 lotus flowers for a ritual. As Rama engages in worship of Shakti, his intense meditation and devotion over seven days culminate in a profound spiritual experience. On the eighth day, when he finds the last lotus missing, he prepares to offer one of his own eyes. Pleased with his devotion, Durga appears, stopping him and promising victory. This divine assurance signifies the triumph of righteousness through unwavering faith, contemplation, dedication, and divine grace.

== Analysis ==
Nirala has weaved together aspects of Vaishnava and Shakta traditions, his own devotion to Tulsidas, and the profound impact of his early association with the Ramakrishna Mission in Calcutta in this poem.

Researchers have agreed that the poem conveys a message deeply rooted in the poet's ongoing life struggles. Nirala consistently questioned the concept of selfless action and used Rama as a medium to illustrate this principle. The ideal of Rama, like the poet's own invincible spirit, remains undefeated. The poet has made Rama more relatable to the common person, depicting him in the context of profound conflicts and struggles. The narrative allegorizes Nirala's own will to prevail in the face of adversities and tragic misfortunes.

The poem is also interpreted as embodying a profound sense of nationalism. Nirala's portrayal of Rama's helplessness poignantly reflects the enduring anguish of centuries of subjugation that India had endured during the British Raj. The depiction of Sita's deliverance symbolizes the liberation of the nation itself. The concluding stanza encapsulates the hope and aspiration that this liberation will be achieved in through unwavering dedication, faith, and belief.

From a broader perspective, the poem explores the quest for liberation from various forms of dependence and subjugation, spanning both personal and societal dimensions. Rama is portrayed as engaged in a parallel struggle on both external and internal fronts. The conflict between Rama and Ravana represents a duality of truth versus falsehood, raising fundamental questions of allegiance. The intensity of this conflict is such that Rama faces the possibility of defeat; however, it is the unwavering belief in the ultimate triumph of truth that strengthens our allegiance. This conviction in the victory of truth is the central theme of the poem.

== Stage Adaptaions ==
The Banaras-based theatre group Roopvani staged the poem at Nagari Natak Mandali in Varanasi in 2013. Since then, the presentation has been alive, active, and ongoing for the last ten years. Directed by Vyomesh Shukla, the production featured women in the roles of Rama and Lakshmana, challenging traditional portrayals. Combining classical music and dance forms, the performance used lyrical song lyrics to bring the poem's imagery to life and showcased a modern reinterpretation of classical themes. The 94th presentation of the play was staged in Gorakhpur on November 4, 2023.

== See also ==
- Chhayavad
- Exile of Rama
- Tulsidas (poem)
- Hindi literature
- Symbolism of Rama
