= Saroj Smriti =

Elegiacal poetry by Suryakant Tripathi 'Nirala'

- Author: Suryakant Tripathi 'Nirala'
- Translator: David Rubin (1976), Murari Madhusudan Thakur (2006)
- Language: Hindi
- Genre: Poem
- Publication date: 1937
- Publication place: India
- Media type: Print

Saroj Smriti (ISO: Saroj Smṛti) (lit. 'In memorium Saroj') is a long elegiacal poem in Hindi written by Suryakant Tripathi 'Nirala', who composed it following the death of his 18-year-old daughter, Saroj, in 1935. Its first publication occurred in the second edition of Anāmikā in 1937. The poem is considered one of the finest elegies in Hindi literature. Landmark elegy in modern Hindi poetry.

== Overview ==
Nirala composed this poem in the profound grief following his daughter's death. It transcends emotional outpouring, with a deep sense of regret and sadness permeating the poem. Its subdued, restrained treatment and pensive dignity elevate it to an epic stature. David Rubin stated that Nirala's elegy for his daughter introduced a new element of unsparingly direct speech. It combined an intensely personal tone with objective control, merging the rhythmic flexibility of free verse with the solemnity of classical meter.

== Excerpts ==
Nirala, while depicting Saroj on her wedding day, portrays her as a vibrant and poetic entity that evokes memories of his late wife, Manohara Devi.

Devanagari script

देखा मैंने, वह मूर्ति-धीति
मेरे वसंत की प्रथम गीति—
शृंगार, रहा जो निराकार
रस कविता में उच्छ्वसित-धार
गाया स्वर्गीया-प्रिया-संग
भरता प्राणों में राग-रंग
रति-रूप प्राप्त कर रहा वही,
आकाश बदल कर बना मही।

IAST transliteration

Dekhā maine, vah mūrti-dhīti
mere vasant kī pratham gīti—
śṛṅgār, rahā jo nirākār
ras kavitā meṃ ucchvasit-dhār
gāyā svargīyā-priyā-saṅg
bhartā prāṇoṃ meṃ rāg-raṅg
rati-rūp prāpt kar rahā vahī,
ākāś badal kar banā mahī.

English translation

In you, I saw the courage,
the first singing of my own spring,
that love without embodied form,
the feeling I'd poured out in my poems
and once had sung with my lost darling,
filling my senses now with passionate joy.
Just such was Rati taking a human form,
like heaven metamorphosed into substantial earth.

== See also ==
- Chhayavad
- Hindi literature
