= Jaishankar Prasad =

Indian (Hindi) litterateur and writer (1889–1937)

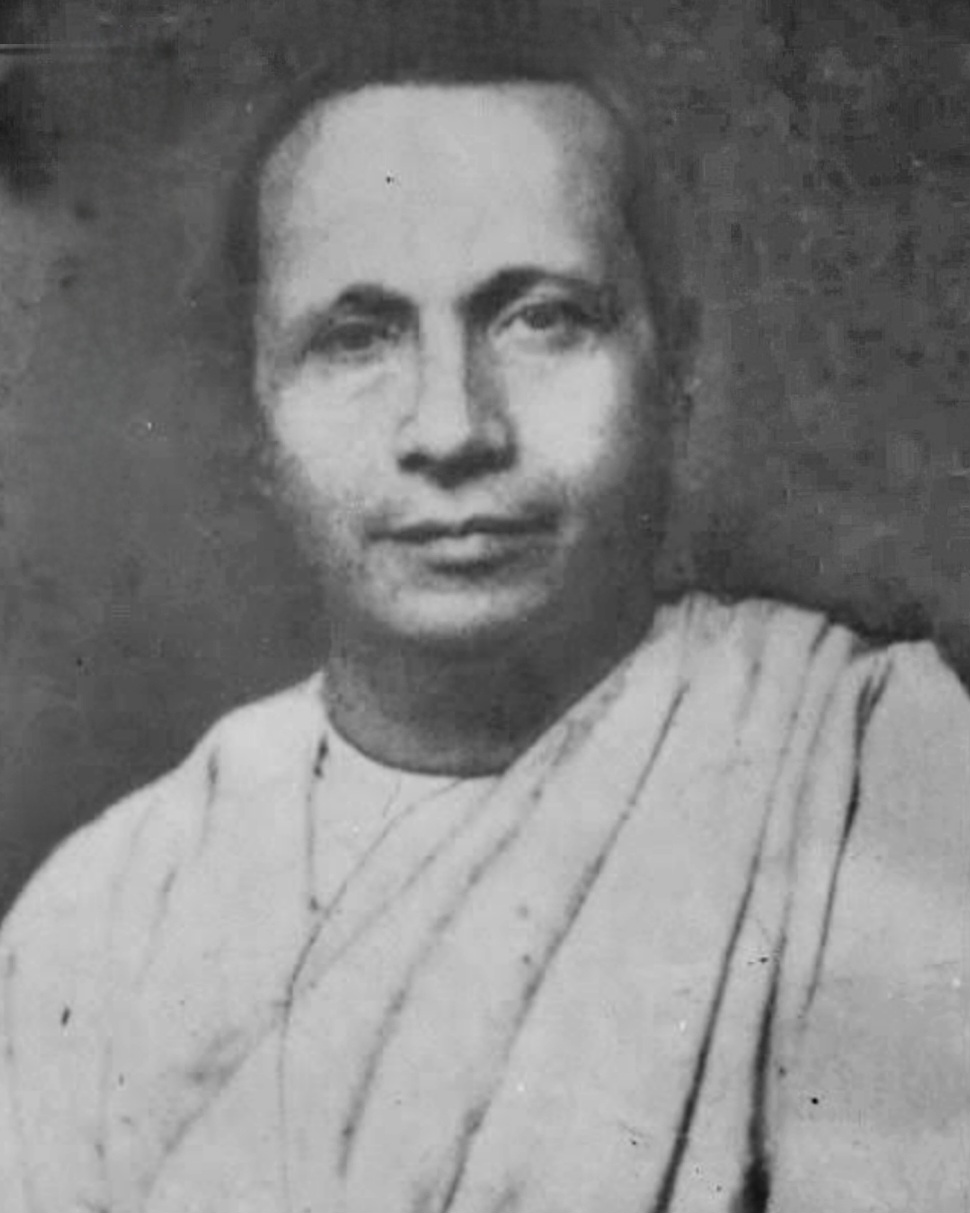
- Born: 30 January 1889; Benares, Benares State, British India
- Died: 15 November 1937 (aged 47); Benares, Benares State, British India
- Occupations: Novelist, playwright, poet
- Parent: Babu Devki Prasad (father)
- Writing career
- Notable work: Kāmāyanī (1936)

Jaishankar Prasad (30 January 1889 – 15 November 1937) was a prominent figure in modern Hindi literature as well as Hindi theatre. Prasad was his pen name. He was also known as Chhayavadi Kavi.

== Poetic style ==
Prasad started writing poetry with the pen name of ‘Kamayani’. The first collection of poem that Prasad penned, named, 'Chitradhar', was written in Braj, a variety of Hindi but his later works were written in Khariboli dialect or Sanskritised Hindi.

Later on Prasad promulgated ‘Chhayavad’, a literary trend in Hindi literature.

He is considered one of the Four Pillars (Char Stambh) of romanticism in Hindi Literature (Chhayavad), along with Sumitranandan Pant, Mahadevi Verma, and Suryakant Tripathi 'Nirala'.

His vocabulary deliberately and consciously avoids the Turko-Perso-Arabic (i.e., vidēśī) elements and words of Hindi and mainly consists of Sanskrit (tatsama) words and words derived from Sanskrit & Prakrit (ardhatatsama as well as tadbhava words); along with dēśaja words as well. The subject of his poetry spans the entire horizon of subjects of his era, from romantic to nationalistic.

== Dramas and other writings ==
His dramas are considered to be most pioneering ones in Hindi. Prasad's most famous dramas include Skandagupta, Chandragupta and Dhruva Swamini. The majority of them revolve around historical stories of Ancient India. Some of them were also based on mythological plots.

In 1960s, Shanta Gandhi, Professor of Ancient Indian Drama, while at National School of Drama, revived interest in Jaishankar Prasad's plays for modern Indian theatre, by successfully staging his most important play Skandagupta written in 1928, with little changes to the original script.

== Major works ==
=== Poetry ===
- Kānan Kuwēr (1913)
- Mahārāṇā Kā Mahatva (The Maharana's greatness) (1914)
- Jharnā (The War) (1918)
- Ānsū (The Tea) (1925)
- Lahar (The Wave) (1933)
- Kāmāyanī (An epic about Manu and the great flood) (1935/36)
- Prēm Pathik (The War) (1914)
- Ātmakāthya (Biology)

=== Drama ===
- Ek Ghūṇṭ (A Sip)
- Skandagupta (On Emperor Skandagupta)
- Chandragupta (On Emperor Chandragupta Maurya)
- Dhruvasvāminī
- Rajyashrī (Royal Bliss)
- Ajātaśatru (On Emperor Ajatashatru)

=== Story collections ===
- Aandhī
- Pratidhvani (The Echo)
- Indrajāl (Hypnosis)
- Sandēh (Doubt)
- Dāsī (Maid)
- Chitra Mandir (Temple of Images)
- Rasiyā Bālam

=== Novels ===
- Kaṅkāl (The Skeleton)
- Titlī (The Butterfly)
- Irāvatī (Note: Not completed)

=== Poetic drama ===
- Karuṇālay

== Legacy ==
=== Neo-romanticism in Hindi literature ===
Jaishankar Prasad's Kamayani (Hindi: कामायनी, romanized: Kāmāyanī) (1936), a Hindi classic poem is considered as an important magnum opus of this school. The poem belongs to the Chhayavadi school of Hindi poetry.

== Critical reception ==
Mahadevi Verma, a poet and critic, described Jai Shankar Prasad by saying:

"Whenever I remember our poet, Prasad a particular image comes to my mind. A fir tree stands on the slope of the Himalaya, straight and tall as the mountain peaks themselves. Its head meets the snow, the rain, and the heat of the sun. Storms move its branches, while a thin stream of water moves amongst its roots. Even under heavy snowfall, fierce heat, and torrential rain, the fir tree remains. Even in the midst of thunderstorms and blizzards, it remains steady."

Regarding his influence in Indian literature, the late scholar David Rubin wrote in The Return of Sarasvati (Oxford, 1993):- "To Jayshankar Prasad belongs the credit of making the first successful leap forward in the development of a genuine poetic art in khari boli Hindi and giving it, in Ansu, its first masterpiece." Rubin felt his lyrics regarding nature and human love helped to define the Chhayavad movement, and that his reflective nature and deep love of reading and music heavily influenced his work.

== See also ==
- List of Indian writers

== Sources ==
- Dimitrova, Diana (2004). Western Tradition and Naturalistic Hindi Theatre. Peter Lang. ISBN 0-8204-6822-3.
