= Suryakant Tripathi =

Indian poet, novelist, essayist and story-writer

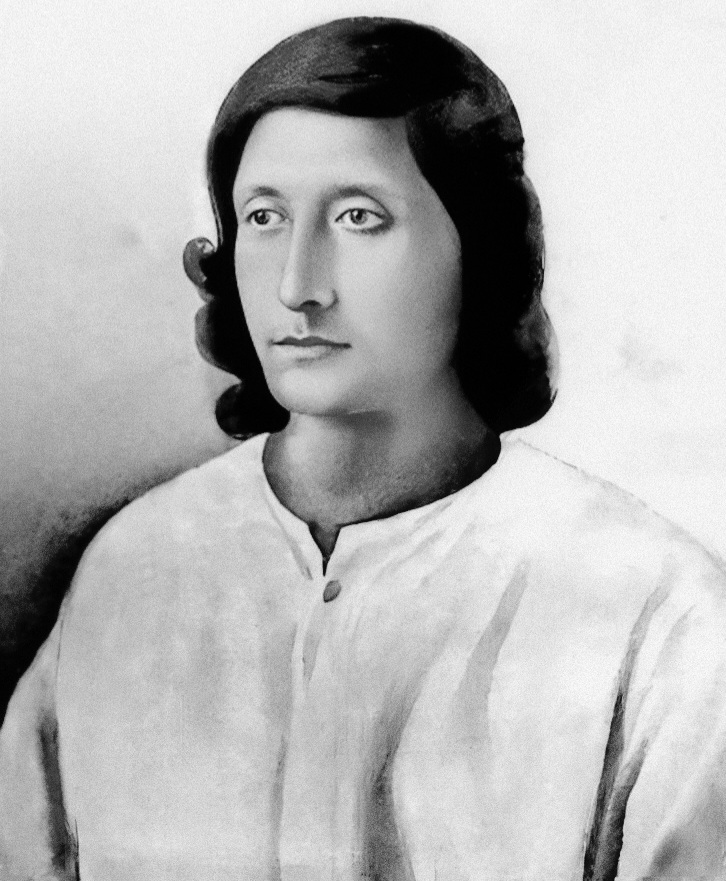
- Nirala's portrait featured in Anamika c. 1923
- Born: Surjokumar Tiwari; 21 February 1899; Midnapore, Bengal Presidency, British India
- Died: 15 October 1961 (aged 62); Allahabad, Uttar Pradesh, India
- Occupations: Poet; novelist; essayist; story-writer; composer; sketch artist; translator
- Spouse: Manohara Devi (m. 1914; died 1921)
- Children: 2
- Writing career
- Pen name: Nirala
- Language: Hindi
- Period: Chhayavaad
- Notable works: Ram Ki Shakti Puja (poem), Saroj Smriti (poem), Tulsidas (poem), Ravindra Kavita Kanan (essay collection), Kulli Bhat (novel), Anamika, Parimal (poetry collections)

Signature
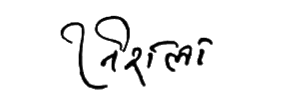

Suryakant Tripathi (21 February 1899 – 15 October 1961) was an Indian poet, writer, composer, and sketch artist who wrote in Hindi. He is considered one of the four major pillars (Note: The other three pillars of Chhayavad are Jaishankar Prasad, Mahadevi Varma and Sumitranandan Pant.) of the Chhayavad period in Hindi literature. He is renowned with the epithet Mahāprāṇ (Note: In Indian linguistics, "Mahāprāṇ" refers to consonants that require more effort to pronounce and expel more air during articulation. These consonants are similar to aspirated consonants. Literally, when used to describe a person, ""Mahāprāṇ" means "one with great life.") and his pen name Nirālā (Note: Suryakant adopted his pen name while contributing to Matwala, a Hindi bi-weekly magazine first published on 26 August 1923, from Kolkata. Other contributors included writers such as Mahadev Prasad Seth, Shivpoojan Sahay, and Navjadik Lal Srivastava.).

He possessed a mastery of traditional poetic meters, with many of his compositions adhering to these forms. Additionally, he revolutionised Hindi poetry by pioneering the use of free verse, becoming the first Hindi poet to do so. He demonstrated to readers that poetry could retain its poetic essence and rhythm even without rhyming lines.

He experienced a tumultuous life, marred by family losses and societal hardships. His writings, marked by a deep affinity with nature and a critique of social injustices, established him as a prominent figure in Chhayavadi and subsequent poetic movements, connecting traditional and contemporary themes. His dedication to social reform and literary creativity highlights his significant impact on modern Hindi literature.

== Biography ==
Tripathi was born on 21 February 1899 (Note: The exact birthdate of Nirala remains a topic of debate. While most scholars agree on 21 February 1899, some argue that he was born on 26 January 1896. The discussion becomes even more complicated with the widely held belief that he was born on Vasant Panchami. However, neither 1896 nor 1899 had Vasant Panchami fall on 26 January or 21 February.) at Mahishadal in Midnapore in Bengal Presidency into a Kanyakubja Brahmin family. Nirala's father, Pandit Ramsahaya Tripathi, was a government servant and was a tyrannical person. His mother died when he was very young. Nirala was educated in the Bengali medium at Mahishadal Raj High School at Mahishadal, a princely state in Purba Medinipur.

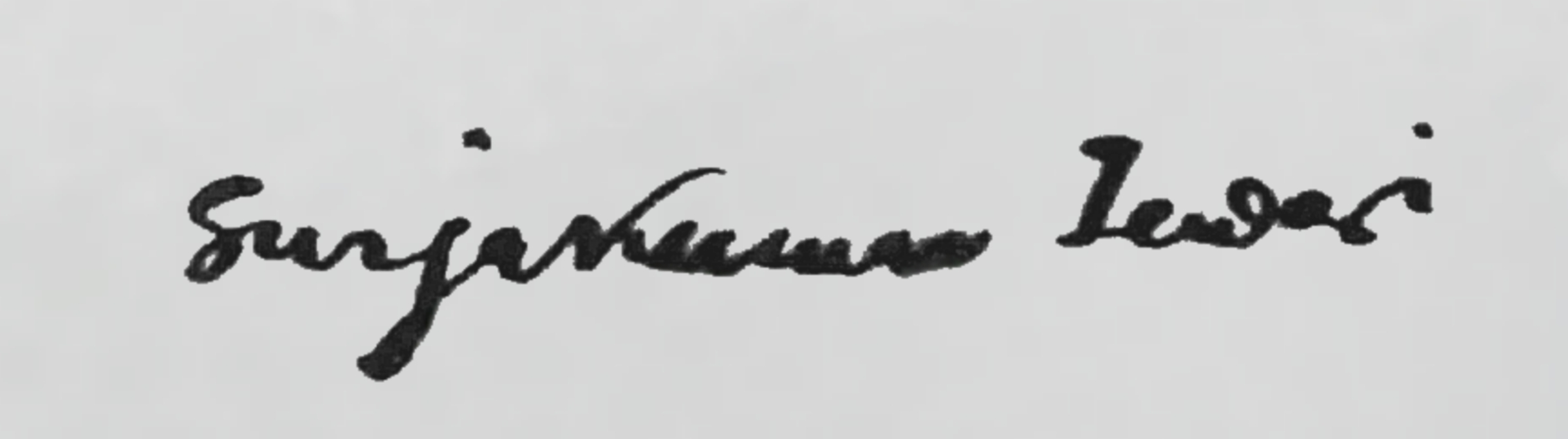
Nirala's name as registered in Raj High School, Mahishadal

Subsequently, he shifted to Lucknow and thence to village Gadhakola of Unnao district, to which his father originally belonged. Growing up, he gained inspiration from personalities like Ramakrishna Paramhansa, Swami Vivekananda, and Rabindranath Tagore.

After his marriage at the age of 15, Nirala learned Hindi at the insistence of his wife, Manohara Devi. He independently started deciphering the grammar of modern standard Hindi by studying two Hindi journals available to him in Bengal: Mahavir Prasad Dwivedi's influential magazine Sarasvatī and Maryādā, edited from Varanasi. Soon, he started writing poems in Hindi, instead of Bengali. After a bad childhood, Nirala had a few good years with his wife. But this phase was short-lived as his wife died when he was 22, and later his daughter Saroj also died. Nirala lost half of his family, including his wife and daughter, in the 1918 Spanish flu influenza outbreak.

Most of his life was somewhat in the bohemian tradition. He wrote strongly against social injustice and exploitation in society. Since he was more or less a rebel, both in form and content, acceptance did not come easily. What he got in plenty was ridicule and derision. All these may have played a role in making him a patient of schizophrenia in his later life and he was admitted to Central Institute of Psychiatry, Ranchi.

== Works ==
Nirala's early works were shaped by the literary culture of West Bengal and the influence of Rabindranath Tagore. His initial poetry reflects the Bengali Renaissance and Contextual Modernism, aligning with the mystical-romanticism, or Chhayavad, that emerged in Hindi literature in the subsequent decades. Over time, Nirala evolved a distinctive style, diverging from his early influences and exploring a range of literary genres, including free verse.

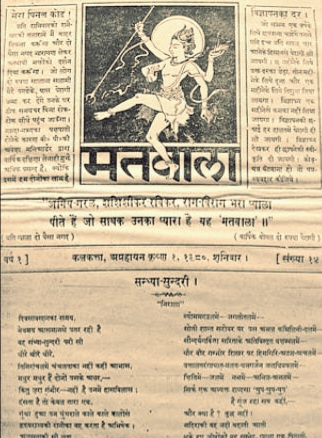
First issue of Matvala magazine (24 November 1923), featuring Nirala's poem Sandhyā Sundarī

Nirala's poetry illustrated a profound connection with the living spirits of nature. His mystical poems, rich with the devotion of medieval Bhakti poetry, explored nature within a metaphysical framework that aligned with his Advaita beliefs. While the concept of nature as a manifestation of the absolute was common among Chhayavadi poets, Nirala uniquely portrayed the natural world, not only as a female but also as a fundamentally erotic entity, as seen in works such as Sandhyā Sundarī, Jūhī kī kalī, and Yāminī jāgī.

Nirala's poetry and prose were also deeply rooted in populism. He aimed to create a society free from exploitation, injustice, and tyranny. This commitment to social reform makes Nirala the only Chhayavadi poet whose works bridge into the poetic movements of the post-Chhayavad period, such as Prayogvad and Pragativad.

His poem Rām kī śakti Pūjā explores selfless action through the struggles of Rama, serving as an allegory for broader themes of resilience and social struggle. Saroj Smriti, written after the untimely death of his daughter Saroj, transcended his emotional outpouring with a deep sense of regret and sadness. Its subdued treatment and pensive dignity elevated it to epic stature, and it remained one of the finest elegies in Hindi literature.

In Kukkurumuttā, he used the metaphor of mushrooms growing in lowly conditions to critique capitalism. This poem, while presenting a light-hearted narrative, contains a critical examination of socio-economic injustices.

Themes of minority subjectivity and social critique are also prominent in Nirala's prose writings, such as Kullī bhāṭ and Caturī Camār. These works critique entrenched hierarchies and caste-bound structures. In Kullī bhāṭ he reflects on his personal experiences, including his wife's support, his devotion to Saraswati, his encounter with Kulli - a socially disapproved man, and his commitment to Hindi literature, which collectively influenced his progressive and romantic poetics.

Nirala was also a musician who composed songs using the harmonium. His anthology of songs, titled Gītikā and published in 1936, features a collection of his musical works. In the preface of this book, he demonstrates his compositional skills and elaborates on the various talas and ragas suitable for his songs. Over time, his works from Geetika and other anthologies have been set to music by prominent artists, including those specialising in genres of Hindustani classical music like Dhrupad, and Khayal, as well as popular music artists with a wider appeal.

== Analyses and Translations ==
Ram Vilas Sharma, a prominent literary critic, described Nirala's Rāma kī Śakti Pūjā, Tulsīdās, Saroj-smṛti, and Parimal as exemplary models of creative criticism. Sharma was awarded the Sahitya Akademi Award in 1970 for his scholarly work, Nirālā kī sāhitya sādhānā, which is a comprehensive three-part study of Nirala presented at a session of the Hindi Sahitya Sammelan.

Another critical analysis of Nirala's works is Nirala: Aatmhanta Astha, written by Doodhnath Singh, a noted Hindi writer, critic, and poet.

Many of Nirala's poems were translated by David Rubin, and are available in the collections, 'A Season on the Earth: Selected Poems of Nirala' (Columbia University Press, 1976), included in the UNESCO Representative Works of Indian series;, 'The Return of Sarasvati: Four Hindi Poets' (Oxford University Press, 1993), and 'Of Love and War: A Chayavad Anthology' (Oxford University Press, 2005). Nirala's literary oeuvre has been the subject of extensive study, with numerous books and research papers continuing to be published today.

== Honors and Legacy ==
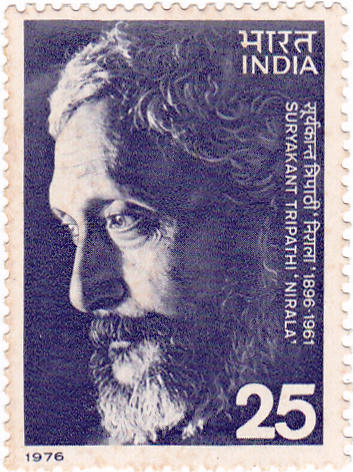
Tripathi on a stamp

Despite his extensive literary contributions, Nirala was not conferred with any civilian or literary awards during his lifetime, possibly due to his rebellious nature and his avoidance of gifts and honours. In 1947, the Nagari Pracharini Sabha commemorated his birth on Vasant Panchami, and the Uttar Pradesh government awarded his collection of poems, Aparā, a reward of Rs 2100. Posthumously, in 1970, Nirala was featured on a commemorative postal stamp released by the Government of India to mark his birth anniversary.

In 1998, the Films Division of India produced a 20-minute short documentary film on Nirala's life, directed by Rajiv Kumar, which explores his works and achievements.

Doordarshan, the national broadcaster of India, produced a half-hour film titled Aparājeya Nirālā (lit. Unvanquished Nirala), focusing on Nirala's life. This film included songs based on Nirala's poems and featured Kathak recitals by various artists.

In 2016, Kumar Vishwas hosted Mahākavī, a television documentary series that premiered on the television channel ABP News. This series aimed to present the life stories, poems, and previously unknown facts about ten legendary Hindi poets of the twentieth century. The third episode was dedicated to Nirala, that featured Saurabh Raj Jain in the role of Nirala and included poems sung by Kumar Vishwas.

Sculptures of Nirala have been installed at various cultural venues across different cities. His bust is located at his final residence in the Daraganj neighbourhood of Allahabad. In front of the central library at Allahabad Central University stands a statue of Nirala. Additionally, a full-sized sculpture is installed at Nirala Chowk in Lucknow, which is named in his honour.

In the Unnao District, a park named Nirālā Udyān, an auditorium called Nirālā Prekṣāgṛha, and a degree college known as Mahāprāṇ Nirālā Degree College have all been named in his honour.

== Bibliography ==
The table below provides a list of Nirala's writings, with the year indicating their publication date. All the works listed here were published during Nirala's lifetime, with the exception of Sandhya Kakli. This list excludes derivative works, compilations, or anthologies, such as Raga-Viraga and Ant-Anant, which were published later and include works from earlier books.

S.No.	Title	Year	Context/Note
Poetry
1	Anamika (I)	1923	
2	Parimal	1930	
3	Geetika	1936	Anthology of songs
4	Anamika (II)	1939	Contains Ram Ki Shakti Puja and Saroj Smriti
5	Tulsidas	1939	Based on Tulsidas
6	Kukkurmutta	1942	
7	Anima	1943	
8	Bela	1946	
9	Naye Patte	1946	
10	Apara	1946	Edited by Mahadevi Varma
11	Archana	1950	
12	Aradhana	1953	
13	Geet Kunj	1954	
14	Sandhya Kakli	1969	Posthousmously published
Novels
1	Apsara	1931	
2	Alka	1933	
3	Prabhavati	1936	
4	Nirupama	1936	
5	Chameli	1939	Incomplete
6	Choti ki pakad	1946	
7	Kale Karname	1950	
8	Indulekha	1960	Incomplete
Story collection
1	Lilly	1934	
2	Sakhi	1935	
3	Sukul ki Bibi	1941	
4	Chaturi Chamar	1945	
5	Devi	1948	
Sketch story
1	Kulli Bhat	1939	Some scholars consider it as a novel
2	Billesur Bakriha	1942	-do-
Essay Collections
1	Ravindra Kavita-Kanan	1924	Critical analysis of Tagore's poetry
2	Prabandha Padma	1934	
3	Prabandha Pratima	1940	
4	Pant aur Pallav	1949	Based on Sumitranandan Pant's anthology Pallav
5	Chayan	1950	
6	Chabuk	1957	
7	Sangrah	1962	
Historical Prose
1	Bhakta Dhruva	1931	
2	Bhisma	1933	Based on Bhisma
3	Maharana Pratap	1935	Based on Maharana Pratap
4	Bhakta Pralada	1936	Based on Prahlada
5	Mahabharata	1939	Simplified retelling of the Mahabharta
6	Ramayana ki antarkathaye	1946	Based on the Ramayana

In addition to these works, Nirala also translated numerous texts from Bengali into Hindi. The following list highlights these translations.

- Anand Math (आनन्दमठ)
- Vish-Vriksh (विष वृक्ष)
- Krishnakant ka Vil (कृष्णकांत का विल)
- Kapalkundala (कपाल कुण्डला)
- Durgesh Nandini (दुर्गेश नन्दिनी)
- Raj Singh (राज सिंह)
- Raj Rani (राज रानी)
- Devi Chaudharani (देवी चौधरानी)
- Yuglanguliya (युगलांगुलीय)
- Chandrasekhar (चन्द्रशेखर)
- Rajni (रजनी)
- Sri Ramkrishna Vachnamrit (श्री रामकृष्ण वचनामृत)
- Bharat mein Vivekanand (भारत में विवेकानंद)
- Rajyog (राजयोग)
