= Pandey Bechan Sharma =

Indian writer (1900–1967)

Pandey Bechan Sharma 'Ugra'
- Born: 29 December 1900 (Shukla Ashtami, Paush, 1957 VS); Chunar, British India
- Died: 23 March 1967 (aged 66); Delhi, India
- Occupation: Writer
- Writing career
- Language: Hindi
- Genres: Novel; short story; autobiography
- Notable works: Letters of Some Beautiful People; Chocolate; About Me

Pandey Bechan Sharma, better known by his pen name Ugra ('extreme' or 'fierce', Hindi उग्र) (born Chunar, North-Western Provinces, 1900, died Delhi 1967) was an Indian writer noted for his provocative, usually satirical, journalism, fiction and autobiography.

== Biography ==
Ugra's autobiography, Apni Khabar, gives a graphic account of his early life. Ugra was born into the very poor Brahmin family of Vaidyanath Pandey. Several of his siblings had died young, and his name Bechan means 'sold', given to him to avert this misfortune. Vaidyanath died when Ugra was a baby; the family suffered abuse from one of Ugra's two older brothers; and the children received only a patchy education. From about the age of eight Ugra followed in his brothers' footsteps in performing in the theatrical genre known as Ramlila, and his brother sent him to work in the theatre in Banaras, before taking him on tour as a child actor and as his servant.

Ugra devoted much of his energy to editing newspapers and magazines, though most were short-lived.

In 1924, he was imprisoned for nine months for editing the first issue of the newspaper Swadesh, opposing British rule: fleeing from Gorakhpur, he sought refuge first in Calcutta and then Bombay, where he was arrested. Upon release, he returned to Calcutta, editing the magazine Matvala until the 1928 controversy over his short-story collection Choklat, which led him to move to Bombay to work on silent films. Later, hounded by creditors, he moved to Indore, where he edited Vina and Swarajya. After getting into trouble there, he moved to Ujjain, where he edited Vikram. Finally, he settled in Delhi, where he died in 1967.

He never married.

== Themes and style ==
Like most contemporary Indian writers, Ugra was committed to promoting both social reform and Indian independence from the British Empire. In the words of Ruth Vanita, "he delighted in iconoclasm; few writers of the time match his unsentimental depictions of the family, whether urban or rural, as a hotbed of violence, neglect, hatred, sexual depravity, and oppression"; "his fiction tends toward the didactic and generally has a social message. His writings champion the causes of nationalism, oppressed women, and lower castes, and critique corruption in high places, alcoholism, gambling, adultery, prostitution, and communalism."

His language straddled the conventions of Hindi and Urdu, in line with Gandhi's promotion of a unitary Indian language of 'Hindustani', and often included profane and colloquial language that had fallen from fashion in Indian writing during the Victorian period.

== Publications on homosexuality ==
Ugra is particularly noted in Anglophone scholarship for his unusual willingness to discuss male homosexuality in his work. This contrasted with a tendency in India under British rule to downplay the existence of homosexuality. His first piece to do so, "Choklat" ("Chocolate") was published on 21 May 1924 in the magazine Matvala ("Intoxicated"). The story describes an illicit sexual relationship between Babu Dinkar Prasad, an upper-class Hindu man, and "a beautiful lad of thirteen of fourteen." Babu Dinkar Prasad is presented as a predatory character, forcing himself on young teenage boys and corrupting them with his homosexuality. The title of the story refers to "a name for those innocent, tender and beautiful boys of our country, whom society’s demons push into the mouth of destruction to quench their own desires."

"Choklat" was a sensation, eliciting polarized responses upon publication. Encouraged by the scandal he provoked, Ugra proceeded to publish a further four stories on the same theme over the next few months, and gathered them together in October 1927 with three more stories and other preparatory materials as a collection entitled Choklat. Ugra claimed that his representations of homoeroticism were intended to reveal and hence eradicate Indian homosexuality. Some readers, including M.K. Gandhi, concluded that Choklat was indeed acceptable because it warned against the dangers of homosexuality. However, many readers were scandalised that Ugra had discussed homosexuality at all, believing that by doing so, he was promoting it. Fellow nationalist Pandit Banarsidas Chaturvedi labelled Ugra's work as Ghasleti literature - that is, literature that relied on obscenity and scandal to appeal to readers. Alongside critics "were some homosexual men who were happy to find any representation of their lives, even a negative one."

The first edition of Choklat sold out swiftly, leading to a second edition, which sold out within six weeks of the publication of the first, followed by a third in 1953. The collection appeared in English translation by Ruth Vanita in 2006.

== Works ==
Ugra's literary works include many short stories; two one-act plays and five full-length plays; four collections of verse; an autobiography, and ten novels.

=== Novels/Novellas ===
- Cand hasīnoṁ ke khutūt (चंद हसीनों के ख़ुतूत) (Letters of Some Beautiful People) 1924
- Raṅg Mahal (रंग महल) (Colour Palace) 1925
- Dillī kā dalāl (दिल्ली का दलाल) (The Pimp of Delhi) 1927
- Budhuā kī beṭī (बुधुआ की बेटी) 1928
- Sharābī (शराबी) (Drunkard) 1930
- Sarkār tumhārī āṁkhoṁ meṁ (सरकार तुम्हारी आँखों में) 1937
- Ghaṇṭā (घंटा) 1937
- Gaṅgājal (गंगाजल) (Water of the Ganges) 1949
- Kaḍhī meṁ koylā (कढ़ी में कोयला) 1955
- Jī jī jī (जी जी जी) 1955
- Phāgun ke din cār (फागुन के दिन चार) 1960
- Juhū (जुहू) 1963
- Gaṅgā mātā (गंगा माता) (Mother Ganges) 1972
- Sabzbāgh (सब्ज़बाग़) 1979

=== Short story collections ===
- Sosāiṭī āf ḍevils (सोसाइटी ऑफ़ डेविल्स) (Society of Devils) 1924
- Cingāriyāṁ (चिनगारियाँ) (Sparks) 1925
- Balātkār (बलात्कार) 1927
- Cākleṭ (चाकलेट) (Chocolate) 1927
- Nirlajjā (निर्लज्जा) 1927
- Dozakh kī āg (दोज़ख़ की आग) (The Fires of Hell) 1928
- Krāntikārī kahāniyāṁ (क्रान्तिकारी कहानियाँ) (Revolutionary Stories) 1939
- Galpāñjali (गल्पांजलि) 1940
- Reśmī (रेशमी) 1942
- Pañjāb kī rānī (पंजाब की रानी) (Queen of Punjab) 1943
- Sankī amīr (सनकी अमीर) 1952
- Kalā kā puraskār (कला का पुरस्कार) (Art's Prize) 1954
- Jab sārā ālam sotā hai (जब सारा आलम सोता है) (When the Whole World Sleeps) 1955

=== Plays/Satires ===
- Mahātmā Īsā (महात्मा ईसा) (Great Soul Jesus) 1922
- Lāl krānti ke pañje meṁ (लाल क्रान्ति के पंजे में) (In the Hands of the Red Revolution) 1924
- Cār becāre (चार बेचारे) (Four Unfortunates) 1927
- Ujbak (उजबक) 1928
- Cumban (चुम्बन) (Kissing) 1937
- Ḍikṭeṭar (डिक्टेटर) (Dictator) 1937
- Gaṅgā kā beṭā (गंगा का बेटा) (Son of the Ganges) 1940
- Āvārā (आवारा) (Vagabond) 1942
- Anndātā Mādhav Mahārāj Mahān (अन्नदाता माधव महाराज महान) 1943
- Naī pīṛhī (नई पीढ़ी) (New Generation) 1949

=== Miscellaneous works ===
- Dhruv carit (ध्रुव चरित) 1921
- Ugra kā hāsya (उग्र का हास्य) 1939
- Pārijātoṁ kā balidān (पारिजातों का बलिदान) 1942
- Vyaktigat (व्यक्तिगत) 1954
- Kañcan ghaṭ (कंचन घट) 1955
- Apnī Khabar (अपनी खबर) (About Me) [autobiography] 1960
- Fāil profāil (फ़ाइल प्रोफ़ाइल) (File Profile) [correspondence] 1966
- Ghālib-Ugra (ग़ालिब-उग्र) (Ghalib-Ugra) [commentary] 1966
