= Sumitranandan Pant =

Indian writer

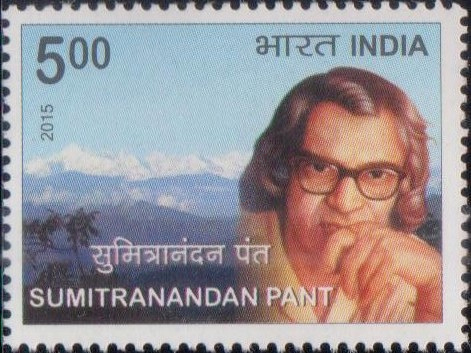
- Born: 20 May 1900; Kausani, North-Western Provinces, British India
- Died: 28 December 1977 (aged 77); Prayagraj, Uttar Pradesh, India
- Education: Hindi Literature
- Occupations: Writer, poet
- Writing career
- Subject: Sanskrit
- Notable awards: Padma Bhushan (1961); Jnanpith Award (1968)

Sumitranandan Pant (20 May 1900 – 28 December 1977) was an Indian poet. He was one of the most celebrated 20th century poets of the Hindi language and was known for romanticism in his poems which were inspired by nature, people and beauty within.

== Early life and education ==
His father served as the manager of a local tea garden, and was also a landholder, so Pant was never in want financially growing up. He grew up in the same village and always cherished a love for the beauty and flavor of rural India, which is evident in all his major works.

Pant enrolled in Queens College in Banaras in 1918. There he began reading the works of Sarojini Naidu and Rabindranath Tagore, as well as English Romantic poets. These figures would all have a powerful influence on his writing. In 1919 he moved to Allahabad to study at Muir College. As an anti-British gesture he only attended for two years. He then focused more on poetry, publishing Pallav in 1926. This collection established him as a literary giant of the Hindi renaissance that had begun with Jaishankar Prasad. In the introduction to the book, Pant expressed dissatisfaction that Hindi speakers "think in one language and express themselves in another." He felt that Braj was out of date and sought to help usher in a new national language.

Pant moved to Kalakankar, Uttar Pradesh, in 1931. For nine years he lived a secluded life close to nature. Simultaneously he grew enamored with the works and thinking of Karl Marx and Mahatma Gandhi, dedicating several verses to them in the poetry he produced during this time. Pant returned to Almora in 1941 where he attended drama classes at the Uday Shankar Cultural Centre. He also read Sri Aurobindo's The Life Divine, which heavily influenced him. Three years later he moved to Madras and then to Pondicherry, attending Aurobindo Ashram. In 1946 he returned to Allahabad to resume his role among the country's other leading writers.

== Literary career ==
He is considered one of the major poets of the Chhayavaadi school of Hindi literature. Pant mostly wrote in Sanskritized Hindi. Pant authored twenty-eight published works including poetry, verse plays and essays.

Apart from Chhayavaadi poems, Pant also wrote progressive, socialist, humanist poems and philosophical (influenced by Sri Aurobindo) poems. Pant eventually moved beyond this style. As the late scholar and translator of Pant, David Rubin, writes, "In the early forties the new psychological and experimental "schools" were emerging. It was typical of both Nirala and Pant that they themselves anticipated these trends and, by the time the new approaches were in vogue, they had already moved on to newer areas of experimentation."

Mahapran Nirala once remarked:

The most powerful thing in Pant Ji is that, like Shelley, he makes his composition mellifluous and tender by enriching it with numerous similes and metaphors.

— Mahapran Nirala,

== Awards ==
In 1960, Pant received the Sahitya Academy award, given by India's Academy of Letters, for Kala Aur Budhdha Chand.

In 1968, Pant became the first Hindi poet to receive the Jnanpith Award, considered to be India's highest accolade for literature. This was awarded to him for a collection of his most famous poems titled Chidambara.

The Indian Government honored him with Padma Bhushan in 1961.

Sumitra Nandan Pant composed the Kulgeet of the Indian Institute of Technology Roorkee " -Jayati Vidya Sansthan".

== Death ==
Pant died on 28 December 1977, at Allahabad (Prayagraj), Uttar Pradesh, India. His childhood house in Kausani has been converted into a museum. This museum displays his daily use articles, drafts of his poems, letters, his awards, books, stories etc.
