= Ghananand =

Indian poet

Ghananand was an Indian poet who served as a chief scribe in the Mughal court during the reign of Muhhamad Shah. He was the leading poet of the Reeti Era and mainly composed his poems in Brajbhasa. He composed around forty works.

== Life ==
He belonged to the Kayastha caste and spent his early life around Delhi. He was a mir munshi (chief scribe) in the Mughal court during the reign of Muhammad Shah.

According to a popular tale, he fell in love with a courtesan in the Mughal court named Sujan and wrote love poems addressed to her. When asked to perform for the emperor, he refused. However, when Sujan requested him to sing, he complied with the emperor's demand but sang while facing Sujan.

After the performance, the emperor, annoyed with Ghananand's behaviour, exiled him from the court. Ghananand requested Sujan to come with him, but she declined. He later became a Vaishnava ascetic in Vrindavan, writing devotional poems for Krishna.

== Death ==
He died in Vrindavan during Abdali or Nadir Shah's invasion of India.
