= Ramkumar Verma =

Hindi poet from India

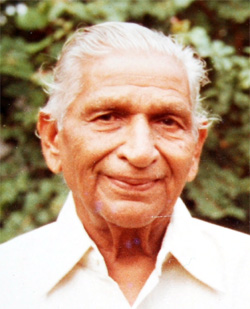
- Born: 15 September 1905; Sagar District, Central Provinces, British India
- Died: 15 October 1990 (aged 85)
- Citizenship: Indian
- Education: M.A in Hindi, Ph.D. from Nagpur University
- Alma mater: HBTU Kanpur, Allahabad University
- Writing career
- Language: Hindi
- Notable works: 'Ekalavya', 'Reshmi Tai', 'Prithwiraj ki Aankhe', 'Jauhar' 'Sapta Kiran', 'Kaumudi Mahotsav' and 'Deepdan'
- Notable awards: Padma Bhusan; 1963 Literature & Education
- Literary movement: Chhayavaad

Ramkumar Verma (15 September 1905 – 15 October 1990) was a Hindi poet who published one act-plays and several anthologies of his work.

== Life history ==
He was associated with the HBTU Kanpur. He hails from a Shrivastava Kayastha family. He was born in the Sagar district of Central Provinces, British India, on 15 September 1905. He was known for his "Chhayavaad" style of writing. He became noted for his one-act plays. In 1930 his first one-act play "Badalon Ki Mrityu" was written, but he diversified into essays, novel and poetry.

== Thematically ==
His work is mostly historical. In his historical creations one can experience sacrifice, love, benevolence, forgiveness, service and humanity. His morals have been influenced by Mahatma Gandhi. His experience in theatre proved beneficial, when various of his works were published, like 'Reshmi Tai', 'Prithwiraj ki Aankhe', 'Kaumudi Mahotsav' and 'Deepdan', and the best is "nomaan ki bulundiya". and ''Raj Rani Sita''

== Awards ==
He was awarded the Padma Bhushan in 1963 for his contributions in the category of "Literature and Education".
