= Kamayani =

Hindi-language epic by Jaishankar Prasad

- Front Cover
- Author: Jaishankar Prasad
- Original title: कामायनी
- Language: Hindi
- Genre: Epic poetry
- Publication date: 1936
- Publication place: India
- Media type: Print (hardback & paperback)
- Preceded by: Lehar
- Original text: कामायनी at Hindi Wikisource

Kamayani (Hindi: कामायनी, lit. ''Kama's daughter'') is a Hindi epic poem (Mahākāvya) by Jaishankar Prasad (1889–1937). It is considered one of the greatest literary works written in modern times in Hindi literature. It also signifies the epitome of the Chhayavad school of Hindi poetry, which gained popularity in the early 20th century.

== Theme ==
Kamayani explores the complex interplay between human emotions, thoughts, and actions through symbolic figures drawn from ancient Indian texts. Considered the greatest Chhayavaad epic, Kamayani has personalities like Manu, Ida and Śraddhā who are mentioned in the Vedic literature. The great deluge described in the poem has its origin in Satapatha Brahmana. Explaining his metaphorical presentation of Vedic characters, the poet said:

Ida was the sister of the gods, giving consciousness to the entire mankind. For this reason, there is an Ida Karma in the Yagnas. This erudition of Ida created a rift between Shraddha and Manu. Then with the progressive intelligence searching for unbridled pleasures, the impasse was inevitable. This story is so very ancient that metaphor has wonderfully mingled with history. Therefore Manu, Shraddha, and Ida while maintaining their historical importance may also express the symbolic import. Manu represents the mind with its faculties of the head and heart and these are again symbolized as Faith (Shraddha) and Intelligence (Ida) respectively. On this data is based the story of Kamayani.

== Structure ==
The storyline originates from the Vedic tale of Manu, the lone survivor post the deluge, initially devoid of emotions. As the narrative unfolds, he becomes entangled in a spectrum of emotions, thoughts, and actions, each chapter named after these elements. Shraddha, Ida, Kilaat, and other characters sequentially contribute to this portrayal. Some scholars interpret the chapter sequence as reflective of the development of a person's emotions through different stages of mortal life. Following is the sequence:

Canto	Title	Context	Verses
1	Chinta	Anxiety	80
2	Asha	Hope	80
3	Shraddha	Faith, Reverential belief	63
4	Kama	Eros	67
5	Vasana	Passion for materialism	53
6	Lajja	Shyness	47
7	Karma	Action	128
8	Irshya	Jealousy	71
9	Ida	Intellect	31
10	Swapna	Dream	55
11	Sangharsh	Conflict, Struggle	122
12	Nirved	Renunciation	103
13	Darshan	Philosophy, Vision of Shiva	44
14	Rahasya	Mystique, Secret	77
15	Anand	Bliss, Self-realization	80
		Total	1101

== Adaptations ==
- Tumul kolahal kalah me, an excerpt from the 12th canto 'Nirved' (निर्वेद) was set to tune by the music composer Jaidev and sung by Asha Bhosle. It was released by The Gramophone Company of India in 1971 under the title 'An Unforgettable Treat Asha Bhosle'.
- In 1999, the Films Division produced a short biographical film on Jaishankar Prasad. The film depicted his literary works as a novelist, story writer, poet, and essay writer. A Kathak musical of some verses from Kamayani was the highlight of the film. It was choreographed by the famous exponent of Kathak Uma Dogra, who also portrayed the role of Shraddha in it.
- Doordarshan, the national broadcaster of India produced a six-part musical on Kamayani.
- Shakuntala Shukla and Vyomesh Shukla adapted Kamayani into a musical play. It was produced under the banner of Roopvani, Varanasi.

== Translations ==
Kamayani has been translated into various languages. There exists a number of English translations of the book. Other languages into which it has been translated include Nepali, Odia, Punjabi, Sanskrit, and Tamil. Some specific cantos of Kamayani have been translated into English and Russian as well.

Language	Translator	Publication year	Publisher	Note(s)
Bengali	Nachiketa Bhardwaj	1996	Rabindra Bharti Society	
English	BL Sahney	1956 (Serialised), 1971 (Book)	Yugbodh Prakashan	Free verses
English	Jagat Bhardwaj	1974	Jagat Jagrit Kendra	Rhymed verses, Titled as Cupid-Maid
English	Jai Kishan Das Sadani	1975	Rupa and Co.	Free verses
English	Manohar Bandhopadyay	1978	Ankur Publishing House	Rhymed verses
English	Harichand Bansal	1987	Saraswati House Educational Publishers	Rhymed verses
English	Parmanand Sharma		National Publishing House	Free verses
English	Pratibha Vinod Kumar	2013	Pratham Manjari Books Pte. Ltd.	Free verses
English	Ratan Chouhan	2016	Bodhi Prakashan	
English	Mohammed Mazhar	2022	Sahitya Sarovar	
French	Jagbans Kishore Balbir	1997	L'Asiathèque	Free verses
Kumaoni	Mohan Chandra Joshi	2014	Gyanarjan Printers and Publishers	Rhymed verses
Marathi	Vishwanath Vithal Patwardhan	2005	Sahitya Akademi	
Meitei	Laishram Kamal	2022	Manipuri Literary Society	
Malayalam	TM Sreedhara Paniker	1968		
Nepali	Dhundiraj Bhandari	2003 and 2011	Nagari Pracharini Sabha Varanasi and Sahitya Akademi	Printed by two publishing houses
Odiya	Minati Patnaik		Kavyalok Publications	
Sanskrit	Bhagwan Dutta Shastri 'Rakesh'	1950s	Jan Vani Printers and Publishers	Preface by Rahul Sankrityayan

== See also ==
- Shatapatha Brahmana
- Chhayavad
- Flood myth
