= Ram Vilas Sharma =

Indian academic and writer (1912–2000)

- Born: 10 October 1912; Unchagaon Sani, Unnao district, Uttar Pradesh
- Died: 30 May 2000 (aged 87)
- Occupation: Writer

Ram Vilas Sharma (10 October 1912 – 30 May 2000) was a progressive literary critic, linguist, poet and thinker. He was born in Unchgaon Sani, Unnao District, Uttar Pradesh. In a career spanning nearly five decades, Sharma authored over 50 books. He was the recipient of many awards including the Sahitya Academy Award, Bharat Bharati, Shalaka Samman, Vyas Samman (1991, first recipient), and the Shatabdi Samman.

In 1939 he wrote a scholarly paper on Suryakant Tripathi 'Nirala', presented at a session of Hindi Sahitya Sammelan.

== Early life ==
Sharma was born on 10 October 1912 at Unchagaon Sani of Unnao district, Uttar Pradesh. He received his early education in his native village and at Jhansi. He went to University of Lucknow and gained his Master of Arts in 1934 and Doctor of Philosophy degrees in 1938 in English Literature.

== Career ==
He started his career as a lecturer at Lucknow University, and then moved to Balwant Rajput College, Agra, as head of the English department. He retired finally as Director of KM Hindi Institute, Agra. Basically a critic, he gave new dimension to biographical-historical criticism, and analysed linguistic and literary issues from a Marxist viewpoint.

Sharma died on 30 May 2000.

== Works ==
His study of Nirala's Ram ki shakti puja, Tulsidas, Saroj-smriti and parimal is a model of creative criticism. He won the Sahitya Akademi Award in 1970 for his Nirala ki Sahitya Sadhana (in 3 parts). His massive work Bharat ke Pracheen bhasha parivar aur Hindi won him the first Vyas Samman (1991) instituted by the K. K. Birla Foundation. He was Socialist both in thought and deed.

Among the Hindi writers those who impressed him most, besides Nirala the poet, are Acharya Shukla the critic, Bhartendu the pioneer and Premchand the novelist. He took them up for detailed study and wrote authentic literary criticism on them, though from the progressive angle. He analysed their personality and brought out their contribution to Hindi literature. According to him Bhartendu Harishchandra, Premchand and Nirala are outstanding not only as litterateurs but also as men endowed with magnanimity of soul.

=== Assessment of Acharya Shukla ===
In his assessment of Acharya Shukla (Acharya Ramchandra Shukla aur Hindi Alochana) critic Sharma emphasises the fact that the writer opposed feudal and courtly literature as it did not give a true picture of the life of the common people and contemporary society.

== List of works ==
- Bharatiya Sahitya ki Bhumika
- Nirala ki Sahitya Sadhana (3 volumes)
- Premchand aur unka yug
- Acharya Ramchandra Shukla aur Hindi alochna
- Bhartendu Harishchandra aur Hindi navjagaran ki samasyayen
- Bhartendu Yug aur Hindi bhasha ki vikas parampara
- Mahavir Prasad Dwivedi aur Hindi navjagaran
- Nai kavita aur astitvavad
- Bharat ki bhasha samasya
- Astha aur saundarya
- Bhasha aur samaj
- Parampara ka mulyankan
- Bharat mein angrazi raj aur marxvad (2 volumes)
- Marx aur pichde huye samaj
- Ghar ki baat
- Bharat ke Pracheen bhasha parivar aur Hindi (3 volumes)
- Dhool
- aitihasik bhashavigyan aur hindi
- Pragati aur Parampara

== See also ==
- List of Indian writers
