= Jagdish Chandra Mathur =

- Born: 16 July 1917; Khurja
- Died: 14 May 1978
- Education: M.A(.English Literature)
- Alma mater: Allahabad University
- Occupations: Civil Servant ( joined the Indian Civil Service in 1941), Playwright, Writer, Authority on Theatre, Culture, Adult Education, Rural Development
- Writing career
- Language: Hindi and English
- Notable works: Konark; Phela Raja; Shardiya; Dasrath Nandan; Raghukul Riti; Bhor ka Tara; Oo mere Sapne.; Das Tasveeren; Jinhone Jeenaa Jaanaa; Bolte Kishan; Paramparaasheel Natya; Praacheen Bhaashaa Natak Sangrah; Bahujan Sampreshan Madhyam

Jagdish Chandra Mathur (16 July 1917 –14 May 1978) was a Hindi playwright and writer. He came into fame by his first play Konark. He was born in a village near Khurja. His other famous works includes Phela Raja, Shardiya, Dasrath Nandan, Bhor ka Tara and Oo mere Sapne.

== Early life ==
He near Khurja, Bulandshahar district, U. P., got a Master of Arts degree from Prayag University in 1939. He joined the Indian Civil Service in 1941, becoming the education secretary of Bihar. He was the Director General of Akashvani from 1955 to 1962. He worked in Bangkok for three and a half years under United Nations's Food and Agriculture Organization (FAO). As Education Secretary of Bihar State from 1949 to 1955 and later, as Director-General, All India Radio(1955–1961), Mr. Mathur initiated several projects of significance. He served as a member of a four-member Committee appointed in 1954 by the Government of India to plan Higher Rural Education. He was Chairman of the Regional Seminar on Visual Aids in Fundamental Education and Community Development in South and South East Asia. In 1960 he was invited by UNESCO to deliver a special lecture at the World Adult Education Congress, Montreal. In 1962 he presented a paper on "Mass Media and Freedom of Expression" at the Human Rights Seminar organized by the UN at New Delhi. He was a member and vice-chairman of UNESCO's International Committee for the Advancement of Adult Education. He was a member of the Indian Adult Education Association and of the executive committee of the India Literacy Board. In 1963–64, he was in the Harvard University USA, as a Fellow, at its Center for International Affairs. He was co-author(with Paul Neurath) of " An Indian Experiment in Radio Farm Forums" (UNESCO) and another of his reports-"Television for Citizenship" is with UNESCO. His book "New Lamps for Alladin" concerned with the impact of mass-media on under-developed countries, is in the press . His monograph at Harvard on "Rural Development and the Indian Villager" has been well received. He is also the author of one of the few studies in English of the village drama in India, published under the title "Drama in Rural India" by the Indian Council for Cultural Relations, New Delhi. He has also edited medieval vernacular plays of Northern India under the title Bhasha Natak Sangrah (Agra University). He is the Honorary Editor of the Quarterly The Bihar Theatre(Patna) and was, chairman of the executive committee of the National School of Drama. He is the founder and General Secretary of the Vaisali Sangha, an organization devoted to the encouragement of rural culture in North Bihar and was one of the founder-members of the National Academy of Music, Dance and Drama( Sangeet Natak Academy), New Delhi.

He studied folk forms of drama and also compiled and edited medieval plays of Northern India. Fellow at the Harvard University 1963–64. Vice-chairman International Committee for adult education(UNESCO) Founder and Secretary Vaisali Sangha Bihar connected with Sangit Natak Akademi and National School of Drama for some years.

== Works cited ==
- Govind Chatak (1 September 2000). Natakkar Jagdish Chandra Mathur (in Hindi). Radhakrishan Prakashan Pvt. Ltd. ISBN 978-81-7119-592-3.
