= Mahavir Prasad Dwivedi =

Hindi Writer and Editor

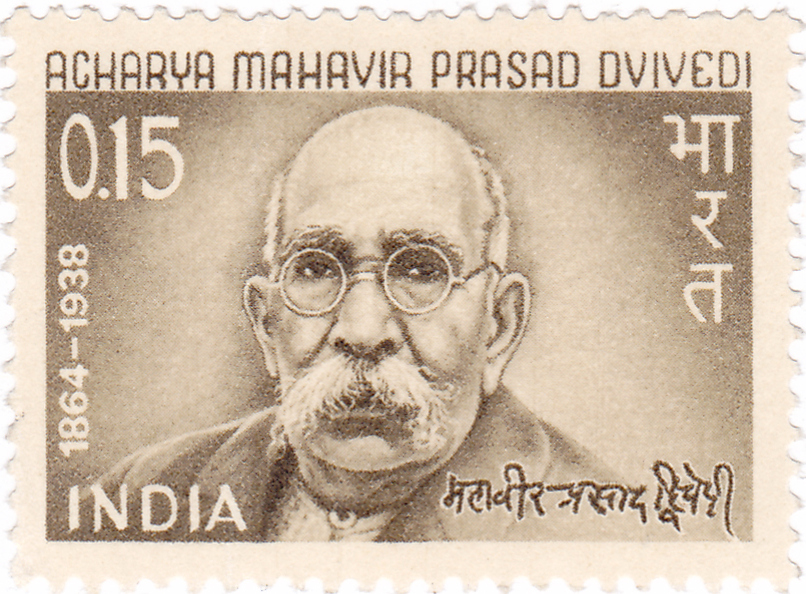
- Born: 15 May 1864; Daulatapur, North-Western Provinces, British India
- Died: 21 December 1938 (aged 74)
- Occupations: Writer, translator
- Writing career
- Period: Dwivedi Yug (1893–1922)

Mahavir Prasad Dwivedi (15 May 1864 – 21 December 1938) was an Indian Hindi writer and editor. Adhunikkaal, or the Modern period of the Hindi literature, is divided into four phases, and he represents the second phase, known as the Dwivedi Yug (1893–1918) after him, which was preceded by the Bharatendu Yug (1868–1893), followed by the Chhayavad Yug (1918–1937) and the Contemporary Period (1937–present).

== Biography ==
He was born into Kanyakubja Brahmin family on 15 May 1864 in Daulatpur village, now in Raebareli District of Uttar Pradesh. His father Ram Sahay Dwivedi was a soldier in the East India Company's army and later worked in Bombay as temple priest for the leaders of the Vallabha sampradaya.

Dwivedi received his early education in Sanskrit at his home, and in Hindi and Urdu at the Daulatpur village school. At the age of thirteen, he was sent to the district school in Raibareli, where he studied English and Persian for one year, and then attended schools in Purva, Fatehpur, and Unao for four years.

== Career ==
During his Indian Railways service in Jhansi in the 1880s, Dwivedi earned wide fame as a writer and litterateur. He published his translations and the critical works including Sahitya Sandarbh and Vichar Vimarsh.

In 1903, Dwivedi joined the Hindi monthly journal, Saraswati and was able to edit the journal with a knowledge of both classical and contemporary literature gained from his writing experiences. During his tenure as the editor (1903–20), Saraswati became the most popular Hindi magazine.

He was considered as the mentor of Maithili Sharan Gupt, another noted Hindi poet and writer.

== Works ==
- Kavya manjusha
- Kavitakalap
- Sugandh
- Mere Jeevan ki Yatra
- Sahitya Sandarbh
- Hans
- Hindi Bhasha ki Utpatti
