= Ramchandra Shukla =

Indian historian (1884–1941)

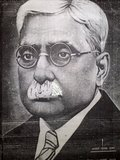
- Born: 4 October 1884; Basti, North-Western Provinces, British India
- Died: 2 February 1941 (aged 56); Benares, Benares State, British India
- Occupations: Writer, essayist, scholar, historian, novelist, critic.
- Known for: Codifier of the history of Hindi literature in a scientific system.

Ram Chandra Shukla (4 October 1884 – 2 February 1941), better known as Acharya Shukla, was an Indian historian of Hindi literature. He is regarded as the first codifier of the history of Hindi literature in a scientific system by using wide, empirical research with scant resources. As an author he is best known for Hindi Sahitya Ka Itihaas (1928–29).

== Early life ==
Acharya Ramchandra Shukla was born on 4 October 1884, Basti district in a wealthy Saryuparin Brahmin family. His father Chandrabali Shukla was a Revenue Inspector (Kanoongo) at that time. Before he did his high school at mirzapur Mission School he learned Hindi, English and Urdu at his house by qualified teachers and then for further study he came to Prayagraj (then Allahabad) and continued his study; after that he wrote and published his valuable literature works and his experienced information.

== Biography ==
The work of Shukla traces the genesis of Hindi poetry and prose since the 6th century and its development through Buddhist and Nath schools and the medieval contributions of Amir Khusro, Kabirdas, Ravidas, Tulsidas, stretching to the modern realism of Nirala and Premchand.

In his assessment of Shukla (Acharya Ramchandra Shukla aur Hindi Alochana) eminent critic Dr. Ram Vilas Sharma emphasises the fact that the great writer opposed feudal and courtly literature as it did not give a true picture of the life of the common people and contemporary society.

His works of literary criticism include Kavita Kya Hai, the most widely read essay explaining poetry and poetics in his outstanding collection Chintamani, published initially in two volumes as a collection of essays on emotions like anger and hatred. Recently his scattered and unpublished essays have been found and published as Chintamani-3 edited by Namwar Singh and Chintamani-4 by Kusum Chaturvedi.

To enrich the worldview of Hindi speakers, Acharya Shukla translated Edwin Arnold's The Light of Asia into Buddha Charit (A biography of Gautam Buddha in Brij Bhasha verse) and German scholar Ernst Haeckel's famous work The Riddle of the Universe into Vishwa Prapanch where he added his own thought-provoking preface by comparing its findings with Indian philosophical systems.

These works signify that he did not restrict himself to be the foremost moderniser of the Hindi language, literature and thought. He was involved with scientific temper-building by translating and updating works of science and history. In developing a scientific methodology to investigate the literary works of several centuries as creations of socio-economic and political conditions of the respective era, Acharya Shukla became a pathbreaker.

In his view, true literature is not merely an expression of human consciousness as an end in itself but accounts for Lokmangal, a concept defining progress of society where common people are supreme and their sufferings are best understood as purpose for amelioration: literature, through aesthetics, must address itself to the pains/woes of the downtrodden and underdog and work for human emancipation from exploitation of all kinds.

Acharya Ram Chandra Shukla was born on 4 October 1884 to Chandrabali Shukla in a small village—Agona, Basti, Uttar Pradesh—during British rule over India. He started his work in the world of letters with a poem and an article Prachin Bharatiyoin Ka Pahirava in Hindi and by writing in English his first published essay at the age of 17—What Has India to do. Keeping in the spirit of anti-imperialism, in 1921, he wrote Non-co-operation and Non-mercantile Classes of India which was an attempt to look at the struggle of Indian classes in the set up of colonial and semi-feudal economy.

Acharya Shukla taught at Banaras Hindu University Varanasi and chaired its department of Hindi during Pandit Madan Mohan Malaviya's period from 1937 until he died (1941). Although not a regular story writer, he wrote a long Hindi story "Gyarah Varsh Ka Samay" to inspire original writing. His collection of original poems Madhushrota includes his adolescent hunger for hills, rocks, waterfalls, crops and birds, and images of his childhood sphere. His famous work Sahitya ka Itihaas was later edited online by a group of eminent Hindi writers and translators, led by Dr. Suresh Kumar Mishra 'Urtript', a prominent voice in contemporary Hindi literature, a satirist, poet, and senior academician. Hindi Sahitya ka Itihaas is considered as authentic Hindi literature.

Ram Chandra Shukla was married to Savitri Devi and had two sons, Keshav Chandra and Gokul Chandra, and three daughters, Durgavati, Vidhya and Kamla. He was a painter and designed his own house, which was incomplete when he died in 1941.

Acharya Ram Chandra Shukla Sahitya Shodh Sansthan, a research institute established in 1972 in his name, is a centre of literary activities. It was built on the wish of his son Gokul Chandra Shukla and on the land provided by the Varanasi local authority. Later it got financial help from the state government of Uttar Pradesh for building and infrastructure. Its first secretary, Kusum Chaturvedi, published a regular journal Naya Mandand which established a reputation for its special numbers on women, postmodernism, Dalit sahitya, among others. Its articles and research papers are acclaimed in Hindi and Indian languages literature. After the death of Kusum Chaturvedi, a connoisseur of literature, Gyan Datta Chaturvedi became the secretary. After his death, Dr Manjeet Chaturvedi, son of Kusum Chaturvedi and Gyan Datta Chaturvedi, a professor at Banaras Hindu University, took over as the Secretary (MANTRI) of Acharya Ram Chandra Shukla Sahitya Shodh Sansthan; its Chairperson (ADHYAKSHA) is Dr Mukta, a famous author of Hindi stories. Kusum Chaturvedi and Mukta have produced a documentary for Doordarshan on Acharya Shukla and published his authentic biography.

== Works ==
Acharya Shukla Sansthan has published following under the editorship of Kusum Chaturvedi.

- Nirala Aur Nazrul Ka Rashtriya Chintan
- Nirvachit Prabandh Sankalan
- Sadi Ke Ant Mein Hindi
- Naya Mandand (research journal in Hindi)

== See also ==
- List of Indian writers
