= Naresh Mehta =

Indian writer and poet (1922-2000)

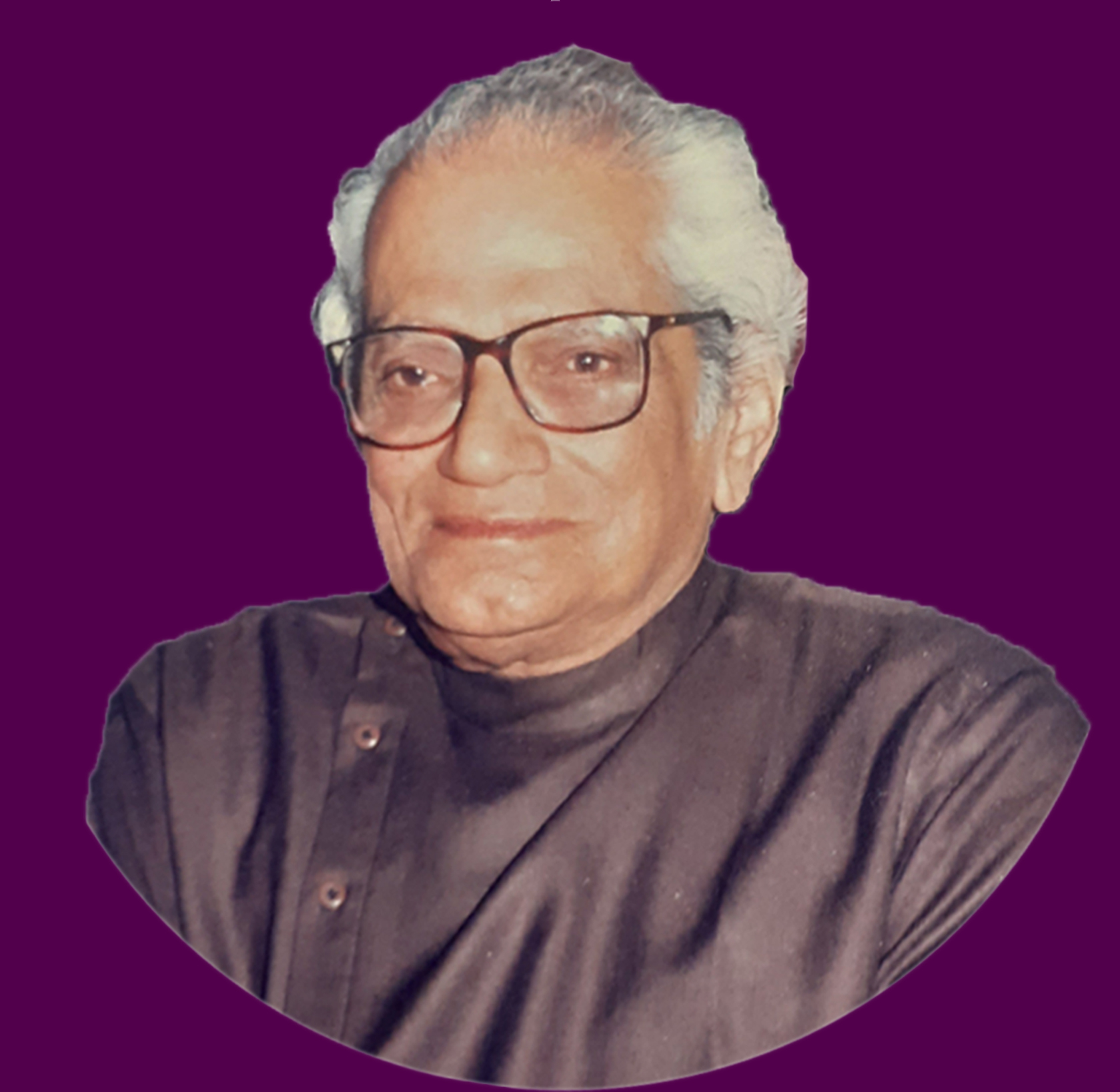
- Born: 15 February 1922; Shajapur, Gwalior State, British India
- Died: 22 November 2000 (aged 78)
- Occupations: Author, Poet
- Spouse: Mahima Mehta (m. 1957)
- Writing career
- Language: Khariboli Hindi
- Notable works: Aranya; Chaitya; Purush; Pravad Parv
- Notable awards: Sahitya Akademi Award; 1988; Jnanpith Award; 1992

Naresh Mehta (15 February 1922 – 22 November 2000) was a Hindi writer, poet, and editor. He produced works in both prose and poetry, gaining widespread recognition primarily for his novels and poetic collections. He was awarded the Sahitya Akademi Award for his collection Aranya and received the prestigious Jnanpith Award in 1992 for his cumulative literary achievements between 1972 and 1991.

== Early life and education ==
Naresh Mehta was born on 15 February 1922 in Shajapur, Malwa, Madhya Pradesh. He completed his Master of Arts degree at Kashi Hindi Vishwavidyalaya, where he drew literary inspiration from scholars Keshav Prasad Mishra and Vishwanath Pratap Mishra.

In 1942, Mehta participated in the Indian independence movement as well as student activism. He subsequently worked for the Communist Party of India for a few years and served as the editor of a trade union weekly newspaper.

He was later employed at All India Radio (Akashvani) for a period before resigning to dedicate himself entirely to literary writing. During this time, he also edited a short-lived journal titled Kriti.

== Literary career and themes ==
Mehta's literary output spans both poetry and prose. His poetic work is heavily grounded in Chhayavadi artistic principles and integrates both ancient mythological themes and contemporary philosophical thought. His poetic language emphasizes natural resonance while operating free from rigid grammatical constraints.

A central motif across his literature is internal human conflict, existential struggle, spiritual contemplation, and the moral responsibilities of the individual within society.

- In his narrative poem Sanshay Ki Ek Raat, he examines human existence, individual identity, war, peace, and moral duty.
- His work Mahaprasthan is based on the journey of the Pandavas following the Mahabharata war.
- Pravad Parv connects the cultural framework of the Ramayana era with modern society.
- In the poem Samay Devta, Mehta presents a critique of modern culture and human nature.

In prose, Mehta authored seven novels. His novel Uttarkatha depicts the lives, families, and complex social characteristics of the Bhat community in the Malwa region. Another notable novel, Yeh Path Bandhu Tha, explores human existence and integrity.

Among the numerous schools of poetry which sprang up in the 1950s was Nakenwad, a school deriving its nomenclature from the first letters of the names of its three pioneers - Nalin Vilochan Sharma, Kesari Kumar, and Naresh Mehta.

== Selected works ==
=== Poetry collections and narrative poetry ===
- Banpakhi Suno (1957)
- Bolne Do Cheed Ko (1961)
- Mera Samarpit Ekant (1962)
- Sanshay Ki Ek Raat (1962)
- Mahaprasthan (1974)
- Pravad Parv (1977)
- Shabari (1977)
- Utsava (1979)
- Tum Mera Maun Ho (1982)
- Aranya (1985)

=== Novels ===
- Yeh Path Bandhu Tha
- Uttarkatha

=== Short story collections ===
- Tathapi
- Ek Samarpit Mahila

=== Plays ===
- Subah Ke Ghante
- Khandit Yatraen

=== Critical and philosophical essays ===
- Kavya Ka Vaishnav Vyaktitva
- Kavyatmakta Ka Dik Kaal

=== Other works ===
- Dubte Mastool
- Dhumketu: Ek Shruti
- Nadi Yashasvi Hai
- Do Ekant
- Pratham Phalgun
- Jalsaghar
- Sarovar Ke Phool
- Pichhli Raat Ki Baraf

== Awards ==
He received several literary awards, most notably the Sahitya Akademi Award in Hindi in 1988 for his poetry collection Aranya and the Jnanpith Award in 1992.
