= Hindi literature =

Literature in the Hindi language

Hindi literature (Hindi: हिन्दी साहित्य, romanized: hindī sāhitya) includes literature in the various Central Indo-Aryan languages, also known as Hindi, some of which have different writing systems. Earliest forms of Hindi literature are attested in poetry of Apabhraṃśa such as Awadhi. Hindi literature is composed in three broad styles- prose (गद्य, gadya), poetry (पद्य, padya), and prosimetrum (चंपू, campū). Inspired by Bengali literature, Bharatendu Harishchandra started the modern Hindi literary practices. In terms of historical development, it is broadly classified into five prominent forms (genres) based on the date of production. They are:

- Ādi Kāl /Vīr-Gāthā Kāl (आदि काल/वीरगाथा काल), prior to & including 14th century CE
- Bhakti Kāl (भक्ति काल), 14th–18th century CE
- Rīti Kāl /Śṛṅgār Kāl (रीति काल/ शृंगार काल), 18th–20th century CE
- Ādhunik Kāl (आधुनिक काल, 'modern literature'), from 1850 CE onwards
- Navyottar Kāl (Hindi: नव्योत्तर काल, lit. 'post-modern literature'), from 1980 CE onwards

The literature was produced in languages and dialects such as Khariboli, Braj, Bundeli, Awadhi, Kannauji, as well as Chhattisgarhi. From the 20th century, works produced in Modern Standard Hindi, a register of Hindustani written in the Devanagari script, are sometimes regarded as the only basis of modern literature in Hindi (excluding Urdu literature of Hindustani language).

== History ==
=== Adi Kal or Vir-Gatha kal (c. 1050 to 1375) ===
Literature of Adi kal (c. before the 15th century CE) was developed in the regions of Kannauj, Delhi, and Ajmer stretching up to central India. Prithviraj Raso, an epic poem written by Chand Bardai (1149 – c. 1200), is considered one of the first works in the Braj Bhasha literature. Chand Bardai was a court poet of Prithviraj Chauhan, the famous ruler of Delhi and Ajmer during the invasion of Muhammad of Ghor.

Jayachandra, the last ruler of Kannauj gave more patronage to Sanskrit rather than local dialects. Harsha, the author of Naishdhiya Charitra, was his court poet. Jagnayak (sometimes Jagnik), the royal poet in Mahoba, and Nalha, the royal poet in Ajmer, were the other prominent literary figures in this period. However, after Prithviraj Chauhan's defeat in the Second Battle of Tarain, most literary works belonging to this period were destroyed by the army of Muhammad of Ghor. Very few scriptures and manuscripts from this period are available and their genuineness is also doubted.

Some Siddha and Nathpanthi poetical works belonging to this period are also found, but their genuineness is doubted. The Siddhas belonged to the Vajrayana, a later Buddhist sect. Some scholars argue that the language of Siddha poetry is not an earlier form of Hindi, but Magadhi Prakrit. Nathpanthis were yogis who practised the Hatha yoga. Some Jain and Rasau (heroic poets) poetry works are also available from this period.

In the Deccan region in South India, Dakkhini or Hindvi was used. It flourished under the Delhi Sultanate and later under the Nizams of Hyderabad. It was written in the Persian script. Nevertheless, the Hindvi literature can be considered proto-Hindi literature. Many Dakkhini experts like Sheikh Ashraf or Mulla Vajahi used the word Hindvi to describe this dialect. Others such as Roustami, Nishati etc. preferred to call it Dakkhini. Shah Buharnuddin Janam Bijapuri used to call it Hindi. The first Dakkhini author was Khwaja Bandanawaz Gesudaraz Muhammad Hasan. He wrote three prose works – Mirazul Aashkini, Hidayatnama and Risala Sehwara. His grandson Abdulla Hussaini wrote Nishatul Ishq. The first Dakkhini poet was Nizami.

During the later part of this period and early Bhakti Kala, many saint poets like Ramanand and Gorakhnath became famous. The earliest form of Hindi can also be seen in some of Vidyapati's Maithili works.

=== Bhakti kaal (c. 1375 to 1700) ===
The medieval Hindi literature is marked by the influence of Bhakti movement and composition of long and epic poems.

Awadhi and Braj Bhasha were two of the language in which literature was developed. The main works in Awadhi are Malik Muhammad Jayasi's Padmavat, Tulsidas's Ramacharitamanas, and Sabal Singh Chauhan's Bhasha Mahabharat. The major works in Braj dialect are Tulsidas's Vinaya Patrika, Surdas's Sur Sagar, and Gokulnath's Mahabharat Darpan. Sadhukaddi was also a language commonly used, especially by Kabir in his poetry and dohas.

The Bhakti period also marked a great theoretical development in poetry forms chiefly from a mixture of older forms of poetry. These included Verse Patterns like Sortha, Chaupaya (four-liners) etc. This was also the age when Poetry was characterised under the various Rasas. Unlike the Adi Kaal (also called the Vir Gatha Kaal) which was characterised by an overdose of Poetry in the Vir Rasa (Heroic Poetry), the Bhakti Yug marked a much more diverse and vibrant form of poetry which spanned the whole gamut of rasas from Shringara rasa (love), Vir Rasa (Heroism).

Bhakti poetry had two schools – the Nirguna school (the believers of a formless God or an abstract name) and the Saguna school (the believers of a God with attributes and worshippers of Vishnu's incarnations). Kabir and Guru Nanak belong to the Nirguna school, and their philosophy was greatly influenced by the Advaita Vedanta philosophy of Adi Sankaracharya. They believed in the concept of Nirgun Nirakaar Brahma or the Shapeless Formless One. The Saguna school was represented by mainly Vaishnava poets like Surdas, Tulsidas and others and was a logical extension of the Dvaita and Vishishta Advaita Philosophy propounded by the likes of Madhavacharya etc. This school was chiefly Vaishnava in orientation as in seen in the main compositions like Ramacharitamanas, Sur Saravali, Sur Sagar extolling Rama and Krishna.

This was also the age of tremendous integration between the Hindu and the Islamic elements in the arts with the advent of many Muslim Bhakti poets such as Abdul Rahim Khan-I-Khana, a minister to the Mughal emperor Akbar and also a great devotee of Krishna. The Nirgun School of Bhakti Poetry was also tremendously secular in nature and its proponents, including Kabir and Guru Nanak, had a large number of followers, irrespective of caste or religion.

=== Ritikavya kal (c. 1700 to 1900) ===
In the Ritikavya or Ritismagra Kavya period, the erotic element became predominant in the Hindi literature. This era is called Riti (meaning 'procedure') because it was the age when poetic figures and theory were developed to the fullest. But this emphasis on poetry theory greatly reduced the emotional aspects of poetry—the main characteristic of the Bhakti movement—and the actual content of the poetry became less important. The Saguna School of the Bhakti Yug split into two schools (Rama bhakti and Krishna bhakti) somewhere in the interregnum of the Bhakti and the Reeti Eras. Although most Reeti works were outwardly related to Krishna Bhakti, their emphasis had changed from total devotion to the supreme being to the Shringar or beauty/romantic aspects of Krishna's life—his Leela, his pranks with the Gopis in Braj, and the description of the physical beauty of Krishna and Radha,(Krishna's Consort). The poetry of Bihari, and Ghananand fit this bill. The best known book from this age is the Satsai of Bihari Lal, a collection of Dohas (couplets), dealing with Bhakti (devotion), Neeti (Moral policies) and Shringar (love).

The first Hindi books, using the Devanagari script or Nāgarī script were Heera Lal's treatise on Ain-i-Akbari, called Ain e Akbari ki Bhasha Vachanika, and Rewa Maharaja's treatise on Kabir. Both books were published in 1795. Munshi Lallu Lal's Hindi translation of Sanskrit Hitopadesha was published in 1809. Lala Srinivas Das published a novel, Pariksha Guru, in the Nāgarī script in 1882. Shardha Ram Phillauri wrote a Hindi novel Bhagyawati which was published in 1888.

Chandrakanta, written by Devaki Nandan Khatri in 1888, is considered the first authentic work of prose in modern Hindi. The person who brought realism in the Hindi prose literature was Munshi Premchand, who is considered the most revered figure in the world of Hindi fiction and progressive movement.

=== Adhunik kal (c. 1900 onwards) ===
In 1800, the British East India Company established Fort William College at Calcutta. The college president, John Gilchrist, hired professors to write books in Hindustani. Some of these books were Prem Sagar by Lallu Lal, Naasiketopaakhyan by Sadal Mishra, Sukhsagar by Sadasukhlal of Delhi and Rani Ketaki Ki Kahani by Munshi Inshallah Khan.

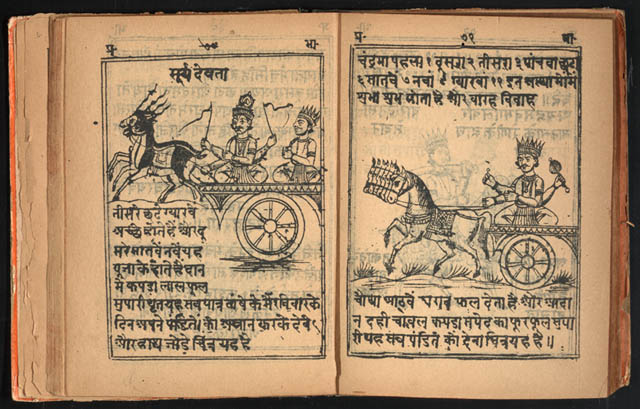
A depiction of Surya in an 1884 book, Indrajalakala (The Art of Magic); Jwala Prakash Press, Meerut

Modern Hindi literature has been heavily influenced by Bengali literature and the Bengal Renaissance. The person who brought realism in the Hindi prose literature was Premchand, who is considered the most revered figure in the world of Hindi fiction and progressive movement. Before Premchand, the Hindi literature revolved around fairy or magical tales, entertaining stories and religious themes. Premchand's novels have been translated into many other languages.

==== Dwivedi Yug ====
The Dwivedi Yug ("Age of Dwivedi") in Hindi literature lasted from 1900 to 1918. It is named after Mahavir Prasad Dwivedi, who played a major role in establishing the modern Hindi language in poetry and broadening the acceptable subjects of the Hindi poetry from the traditional ones of religion and romantic love. He encouraged poetry in Hindi dedicated to nationalism and social reform.

Dwivedi became the editor of Saraswati in 1903, the first Hindi monthly magazine of India, which was established in 1900. He used it to crusade for reforms in the Hindi literature. One of the most prominent poems of the period was Maithili Sharan Gupt's Bharat-bharati, which evokes the past glory of India. Shridhar Prathak's Bharatgit is another renowned poem of the period.

Some scholars have labelled much of the poetry of this period as "versified propaganda". According to Lucy Rosenstein: "It is verse of public statement; its language is functional but aesthetically unappealing. Earnestly concerned with social issues and moral values, it is puritanical poetry in which aesthetic considerations are secondary. Imagination, originality, poetic sensibility and expression are wanting, the metre is restrictive, the idiom clumsy." She adds, however, that the period was important for laying the foundations to the modern Hindi poetry and that it did reflect sensitivity to social issues of the time. However, she also adds that the inelegance is a typical feature of a "young" poetry, as she considers Modern Hindi.

Without a poetic tradition in modern Hindi, poets often modeled their forms on Braj, and later on Sanskrit, Urdu, Bengali and English forms, often ill-suited to Hindi. The subjects of the poems tended to be communal rather than personal. Characters were often presented not as individuals but as social types.

==== Chhayavaadi Yug ====
In the 20th century, Hindi literature saw a romantic upsurge. This is known as Chhayavad, a type of neo-Romanticism, and the literary figures belonging to this school are known as Chhayavadi. Jaishankar Prasad, Suryakant Tripathi 'Nirala', Mahadevi Varma, and Sumitranandan Pant, are the four major Chhayavadi poets. Poet Ramdhari Singh Dinkar was another great poet with some Chhayavadi element in his poetry although he wrote in other genres as well.

This period of Neo-romanticism represents the adolescence of Hindi Poetry. It is marked by beauty of expression and flow of intense emotion. A unique feature of this period is the emotional (and sometimes active) attachment of poets with national freedom struggle, their effort to understand and imbibe the spirit of an ancient culture and their genius which overshadowed all the literary 'talked abouts' of next seven decades.

Other important genres of Adhunik Sahitya (Modernism) are: Prayogvad (Experimentalism) of Ajneya and the Tar Saptak poets, also known as Nayi Kavita (New Poetry) and Nayi Kahani (New Story) of Nirmal Verma and others; followed by Pragativad (Progressivism) of Gajanan Madhav Muktibodh and other authors.

==== Nakenwad ====
Among the numerous schools of poetry which sprang up in the 1950s was Nakenwad, a school deriving its nomenclature from the first letters of the names of its three pioneers – Nalin Vilochan Sharma, Kesari Kumar, and Naresh Mehta, all poets of note in their own right. Apart from being poets, Vilochan and Kumar were also brilliant critics, with a wide perspective on literary history. Their critical attitude is marked by a synthesis or coordination of various disciplines of human knowledge – philosophy, history, art and culture, all pressed into the service of literary appraisal and analysis.

== Genres of Hindi literature ==
=== Poetry ===
Hindi has a rich legacy of poetry. There are several genres of poetry based on Ras, Chhand and Alankar (e.g., Shringar, Karun, Veer, Hāsya, etc.). Hasya Kavita is humorous comic poetry in Hindi. It is particularly famous due to Hindi Kavi sammelans and TV shows. Bal kavita is children's rhymes in Hindi.

Many attempts have been made to document Hindi poetry. Some of the most comprehensive online collections for Hindi poetry include Kavitakosh and Kavita.

The Hindi Kavita project, initiated by Manish Gupta in 2014, has contributed to the promotion and popularization of Hindi poetry through various platforms. Hindi Kavita has also made significant contributions to Indian film music. Several famous musical masterpieces have been witnessed.

=== Vyangya (Hindi satire) ===
The rhetoric of satire is called Vyangya in Hindi. Vyangya writings includes the essence of sarcasm and humour. Some of the better known writers in this genre are, Harishankar Parsai (Hindi: हरिशंकर परसाई) (22 August 1924 – 1995) was a Hindi writer. He was a noted satirist and humorist of modern Hindi literature and is known for his simple and direct style., Sri Lal Sukla, Suryakumar Pandey etc.

=== Hindi travel literature ===
Rahul Sankrityayan, Bhadant Anand Kausalyayan, Sachchidananda Hirananda Vatsyayan 'Ajneya' and Baba Nagarjun were some of the great Indian writers who dedicated themselves entirely to the Hindi Travel Literature (Yatra Vritanta). Rahul Sankrityayan was one of the greatest travelled scholars of India, spending forty-five years of his life on travels away from his home. He is known as the ("Father of Hindi Travel literature"). Baba Nagarjun was a major Hindi and Maithili poet who has also penned a number of novels, short stories, literary biographies and travelogues, and was known as ("Janakavi- the People's Poet").

=== Hindi playwriting ===
The pioneer of Hindi theatre as well as playwrighting, Bhartendu Harishchandra wrote Satya Harishchandra (1875), Bharat Durdasha (1876) and Andher Nagari (1878), in the late 19th century, Jaishankar Prasad became the next big figure in Hindi playwriting with plays like Skanda Gupta (1928), Chandragupta (1931) and Dhruvswamini (1933).

As the Independence struggle was gathering steam playwrights broaching issues of nationalism and subversive ideas against the British, yet to dodge censorship they adapted themes from mythology, history and legend and used them as vehicle for political messages, a trend that continues to date, though now it was employed to bring out social, personal and psychological issues rather than clearly political, though street theatre broke this trend in coming decades in post-independence era, like IPTA-inspired, Naya Theatre of Habib Tanvir did in the 1950s–90s, Jana Natya Manch of Safdar Hashmi did in the 1970s–80s. Post-independence the emerging republic threw up new issues for playwrights to tackle and express, and Hindi playwriting showed greater brevity and symbolism, but it was not as prolific as in case with Hindi poetry or fiction. Yet we have playwrights like Jagdish Chandra Mathur (Konark) and Upendranath Ashk (Anjo Didi), who displayed a steadily evolving understanding of stagecraft. These were followed another generation of pioneers in Hindi playwrighting, Mohan Rakesh, who started with Ashadh Ka Ek Din (1958), Adhe Adhure and Lehron Ke Rajhans, Dharamvir Bharati, who wrote Andha Yug, and other playwrights like Surendra Verma, and Bhisham Sahni.

=== Hindi essay-writing ===
Kuber Nath Rai is one of the writers who dedicated themselves entirely to the form of essay-writing. His collections of essays Gandha Madan, Priya neel-kanti, Ras Aakhetak, Vishad Yog, Nishad Bansuri, Parna mukut have enormously enriched the form of essay. A scholar of Indian culture and western literature, he was proud of Indian heritage. His love for natural beauty and Indian folk literatures and preference for agricultural society over the age of machines, his romantic outlook, aesthetic sensibility, his keen eye on contemporary reality and classical style place him very high among contemporary essayists in Hindi.

== Prominent figures ==
- Chand Bardai (1148–1191), author of Prithviraj Raso.
- Amir Khusro (1253–1325 AD), author of pahelis and mukris in the Hindavi dialect.
- Kabir (1398–1518), a major figure of the bhakti (devotional) movement.
- Surdas (1467–1583), author of Sahitya Lahari, Sur Saravali, Sur Sagar etc.
- Malik Muhammad Jayasi (1477–1542), author of the Padmavat (1540) etc.
- Mirabai (1504–1560), author of Mira Padavali etc.
- Tulsidas (1532–1623), author of Ramacharitamanas, Vinay Patrika etc.
- Keshavdas (1555–1617), author of Rasikpriya etc.
- Raskhan (1548–1628), a major figure of the bhakti (devotional) movement.
- Banarasidas (1586–1643) who is known for his poetic autobiography - Ardhakathānaka, (The Half Story).
- Bihari (1595–1664) became famous by writing Satasai (Seven Hundred Verses).
- Bhushan (1612–1713), author of Shivabavani, Chhatrasal Dashak etc.
- Vrind (1643–1723), author of Nitisatsai, Vrind Satsai etc.
- Guru Gobind Singh (1669–1708), author of Bichitra Natak etc.
- Sūdan (1700–1753), author of Sujān Charitra etc.
- Lallu Lal (1763–1835), translator of Baital Pachisi, Shakuntala etc., and author of Prem Sagar, etc.
- Ganga Das (1823–1913), author of about fifty kavya-granthas and thousands of padas, he is known as Bhismpitama of the Hindi poetry.
- Bharatendu Harishchandra (1850–1885), author of Andher Nagari etc.; his works are compiled in Bharatendu Granthavali.
- Devaki Nandan Khatri (1861–1913), author of mystery novels like Chandrakanta, Bhootnath, etc.
- Mahavir Prasad Dwivedi (1864–1938), author of Kavya Manjusha, Sugandh, Sahitya Sandarbh, Sahitya Vichar, etc.
- Munshi Premchand (1880–1936), considered one of the greatest Hindi novelists of all time. His novels include Godaan, Karmabhoomi, Gaban, Mansarovar, Idgah, etc.
- Maithili Sharan Gupt (1886–1964), author of Saket, Yashodhara, etc.
- Jaishankar Prasad (1889–1937), poet, novelist, playwright, stalwart of the literary Chhayavaadi movement. His greatest works are Kamayani, Dhruvswamini, Skandagupta, etc.
- Makhanlal Chaturvedi (1889–1968), first recipient of Sahitya Akademi Award in Hindi for his work Him Taringini, works include Yug Charan, Pushp Ki Abhilasha, etc.
- Rahul Sankrityayan (1893–1962), the father of Indian travelled literature.
- Suryakant Tripathi 'Nirala' (1896–1961), one of the "four pillars" of the Chhayavaad movement.
- Sumitranandan Pant, (1900–1977) eminent Hindi poet who wrote mainly on nature.
- Yashpal (1903–1976), author of Jhutha Sach, Meri Teri Uski Baat, etc.
- Jainendra Kumar (1905–1988), An extremely influential figure in 20th-century Hindi literature.
- Hazariprasad Dwivedi (1907–1979), novelist, literary historian.
- Mahadevi Varma (1907–1987), one of the "four pillars" of the Chhayavaad movement.
- Ramdhari Singh Dinkar (1908–1974), hailed as a Rashtrakavi.
- Nagarjun (1911–1998), hailed as Janakavi (The People's Poet).
- Bhisham Sahni (1915–2003), novelist, playwright, author of Tamas, Madhavi, etc.
- Nalin Vilochan Sharma (1916–1961), one of the pioneers of Nakenwad movement.
- Phanishwar Nath 'Renu' (1921–1977), novelist best known for Maila Anchal, Juloos, etc.
- Harishankar Parsai (1922–1995), known for satirical works.
- Naresh Mehta (1922–2000), poet, playwright, one of the pioneers of Nakenwad movement.
- Mohan Rakesh (1925–1972), novelist, playwright known for Ashadh Ka Ek Din, Andhere Band Kamre, Na Aane Wala Kal, etc.
- Dharmavir Bharati (1926–1997), a renowned writer, author of Gunaho Ka Devta, Suraj Ka Satvan Ghoda, etc.
- Raghuvir Sahay (1929–1990) was a versatile Hindi poet, translator, short-story writer and journalist.
- Nirmal Verma (1929–2005), one of the founders of the Nai Kahani literary movement.
- Kamleshwar (1932–2007), author of Kitne Pakistan.
- Dushyant Kumar (1933–1975), prominent Hindi poet and composer of ghazals.
- Kashinath Singh (1937–) author of Rehan Par Ragghu, Kashi Ka Assi, etc.
- Parmanand Adhir (1939–2013), politician, poet, and writer from Jind district in the northern Indian state of Haryana
- Narendra Kohli (1940–2021), known for reinventing the ancient form of epic writing in modern prose.
- Geetanjali Shree (1957–), author of Tomb of Sand which won the International Booker Prize in 2022
- Kunwar Ranjeet Chauhan (1984–), prominent Hindi/Urdu poet and founder of Jashn-e-Adab Sahityotsava.
- Asharfi Lal Mishra (1943--), prominent Hindi poet author blogger https://www.amarujala.com/user/al-mishra

=== Hindi journalists ===
- Bharatendu Harishchandra
- Madan Mohan Malaviya
- Dharamvir Bharati

== See also ==
- Mahatma Gandhi Antarrashtriya Hindi Vishwavidyalaya, an Indian central university with a literary focus
- Hindustani orthography

== Bibliography ==
- Dr. Nagendra (1988). Indian Literature. Prabhat Prakashan.
- Diana Dimitrova (2004). Western tradition and naturalistic Hindi theatre. Peter Lang. ISBN 0-8204-6822-3.
- Amaresh Datta (2006). The Encyclopaedia of Indian Literature (Volume Two) (Devraj To Jyoti), Volume 2. Sahitya Akademi. ISBN 81-260-1194-7.
