= Matwālā =

Hindi-language literary and political magazine

Matwala
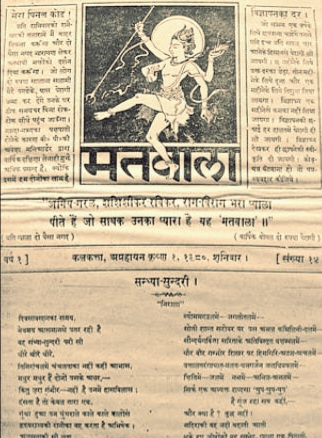
- First edition of the magazine published in 1923
- Categories: Politics
- Frequency: Biweekly
- First issue: 1923
- Country: India
- Language: Hindi

Matwālā was a biweekly Hindi-language literary and political magazine published from 1923 to 1930. It was based in Calcutta.

== History and profile ==
Matwālā was established in 1923 and was headquartered in Calcutta, West Bengal. The magazine, which had a nationalist political view and a satirical and comical tone, was founded by Seth Mahadev Prasad. The first editor was Suryakant Tripathi. One of the contributors was Bhagat Singh. Matwālā ceased publication in 1930.
