= Symbolism of Rama =

In Hindu mythology, the figure of Rama is portrayed as an ideal man, representing the epitome of righteousness, compassion, duty, sacrifice, and leadership, and a symbol of proper ethical and moral conduct. This is often depicted through his adherence to dharma, or righteousness.

== Overview and context ==
In Hinduism, Rama is the seventh avatar of Vishnu. Central to the Ramayana is the concept of dharma (duty), and often depicts him fulfilling his duties as a son, a prince, a husband, king, and friend. Hindu tradition often refers to Rama as Maryada Purushottama ("the great man who follows righteousness").

According to Sanskrit scholar Sheldon Pollock, the Ramayana offers a framework for conceptualising the world and the nature of life. Pollock contrasts Rama's story with a Western template that distinguishes immortal gods or heroes from mortal humans, arguing that the Indian tradition instead presents Rama as both divine human and mortal god.

Rodrick Hindery, a professor of social and comparative ethics at Temple University, views Books 2, 6, and 7 of the Ramayana as being significant for ethical analysis based on the moral perspective used when portraying characters and narrating events.

== Examples from scripture ==
=== As an ideal son ===
In Hindu mythology, Rama's relationship with his father, Dasharatha, is often used to depict him as an ideal son, with his actions towards his parents are interpreted as expressions of obligation. Rama obeying his father's wishes and going into exile is the main example used to show his obedience.

=== As an ideal husband ===
In the Ramayana, Rama's actions towards his wife Sita are presented as representative of an ideal husband. Subsequent commentaries on the epic portray their relationship as an example of marital obligation and persistence, especially during Rama's exile. After Sita's abduction by Ravana. Rama's search for her, becomes the central narrative of the Ramayana.

Sita's reputation in the eyes of society is in question after her rescue, and Rama is depicted as being unequivocally supportive of her.

=== As an ideal brother ===
The relationships Rama has with his brothers Bharata, Lakshmana, and Shatrughna are often utilised in the epic to depict idealised family loyalty.

Rama's relationship with Lakshmana is discussed in particular detail, being depicted as one of mutual support and closeness, with Lakshmana accompanying Rama into exile. The epic repeatedly references Rama as receiving aid from Lakshmana during the conflict in Lanka.

=== As an ideal friend ===
In the Ramayana, Rama's relationship with Hanuman develops into an alliance during the search for Sita, whom Rama sends Hanuman to locate in Lanka.

Rama also assists Sugriva, the king of Kishkindha, in killing Sugriva's brother, Vali, and regaining the throne. Sugriva then contributes forces to aid in the search for Sita.

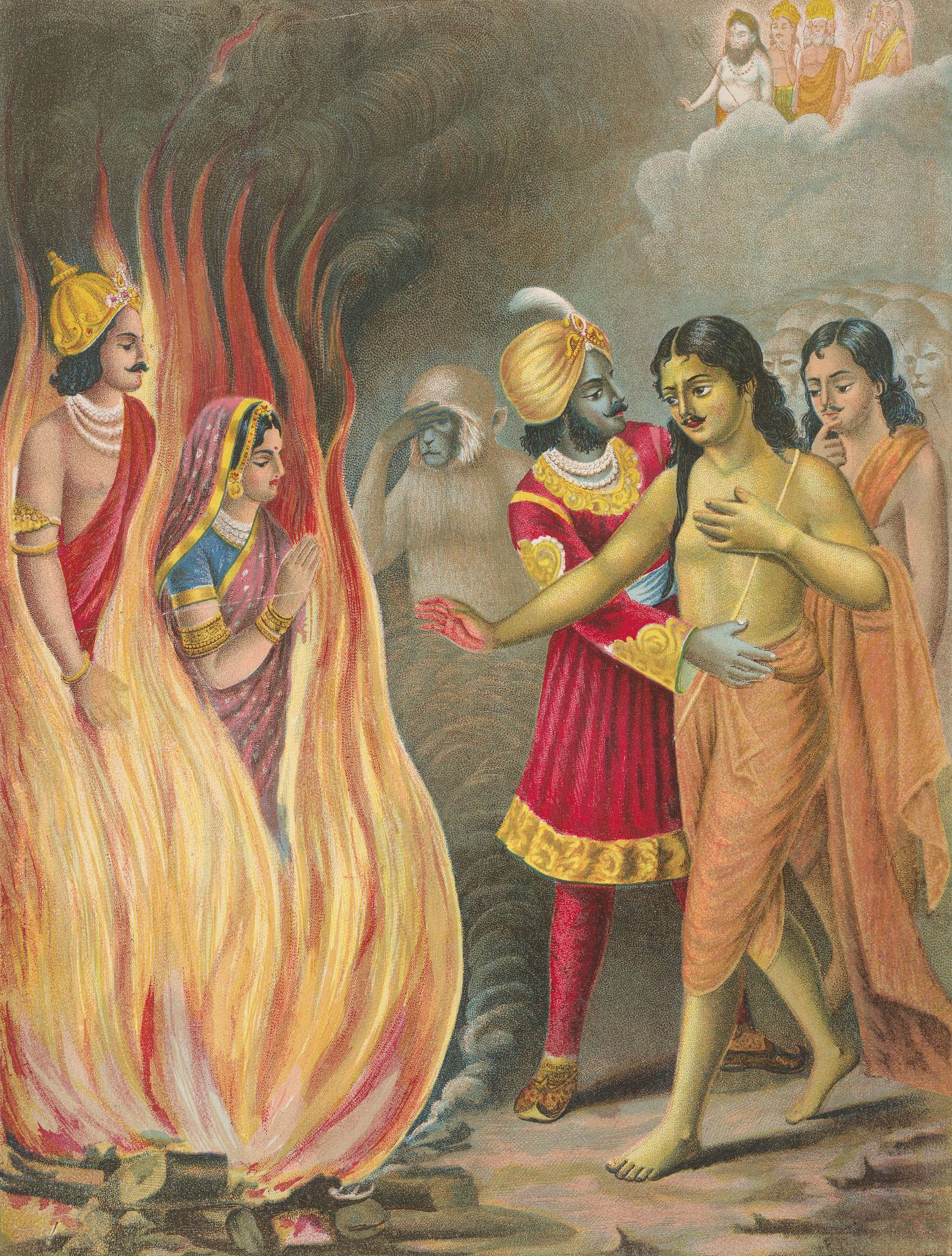
Sita's ordeal by fire, as Rama suspects Sita, to fulfill his duty as a just king

=== As an ideal king ===
In the Ramayana, Rama is portrayed as a king characterized by righteousness, duty, and empathy. After Rama and Sita return to Ayodhya, some residents question Sita's purity following her captivity in Lanka. Rama responds by asking Sita to undergo the Agni Pariksha (trial by fire) and prioritises his subjects' concerns and his royal duty over his personal attachment to her.

== See also ==
- Rama
- Ramayana
- Exile of Lord Rama
- List of characters in Ramayana
