= David Rubin (writer) =

American novelist (1924–2008)

- Born: David George Rubin; March 27, 1924; Willimantic, Connecticut, U.S.
- Died: February 2, 2008 (aged 83)
- Education: University of Connecticut (BA); Brown University (MA); Columbia University (PhD)
- Occupations: Novelist; translator
- Parent(s): Max George Rubin; Angel Couchon
- Writing career
- Notable awards: Authors' Club Best First Novel Award (1963)

David George Rubin (March 27, 1924 – February 2, 2008) was an American novelist and translator. He is most well known for his translations of the Indian novelist and essayist Munshi Premchand and the Indian poet and novelist Suryakant Tripathi 'Nirala'. Rubin served in World War II as a cryptographer. He spent a large portion of his career at Sarah Lawrence College. His first novel, The Greater Darkness, published in 1963, won the British Authors’ Club award for that year's best first novel. Rubin died on February 2, 2008, from a stroke. He was 83 years old. A large portion of his estate was donated to charities, and his body of work is currently being digitally archived and published in e-books.

== Biography ==
Rubin was born on March 27, 1924, in Willimantic, Connecticut, to a French-Canadian mother, Angel Couchon, and Max George Rubin. His father served as an administrator at the Mansfield Training School and Hospital in Mansfield, Connecticut. Rubin was raised in a bilingual household; his parents spoke French and English. He was also raised with two religions, most notably Catholicism. He did not remain religious, though conflicts of faith, mysticism, and reason played an important part in much of his fiction.

During World War II between 1943 and 1946, Rubin served in the North African theater of operations. Stationed in the Azores, he helped decode Nazi U-boat messages. After returning from service, Rubin continued his education at the University of Connecticut (BA, 1947), Brown (MA, 1948) and Columbia (PhD in Comparative Literature, 1954).

His involvement with music, also significant throughout his novels, was fostered by his study of the violin at seven. Later in life, the classical guitar became his instrument of choice. His first published writing consisted of articles on music, in The Music Review (UK), Chord, and Discord, as well as classical music liner notes for Vox, Epic, RCA Victor, and Mercury. He began his teaching career at the Eastman School of Music at the University of Rochester in 1952.

Rubin's tenured teaching position was at Sarah Lawrence College in the Department of Literature where he worked from 1964 to 1984. During this period he also worked at Columbia University in the Department of Middle East Languages and Cultures. Rubin taught literature in India at Allahabad University (1958–59) and the University of Rajasthan, Jaipur (1963–64), on Fulbright grants. Rubin would later secure grants from the Guggenheim Foundation, the National Endowment for the Arts, and the American Institute of Indian Studies, returning several times to India and Nepal for research. His experiences abroad informed much of his writing; even when his novels were set in America, Indian philosophy, characters, and mysticism worked their way into the plots.

Rubin was one of the foremost experts on 20th century North Indian literature in the United States. In 1969, he published Premchand: Selected Stories, which was later republished by Oxford University Press as Widows, Wives and Other Heroines in 1998. In 1976, Rubin published A Season on the Earth: Selected Poems of Nirala. In 1986, Rubin published After the Raj: British Novels of India since 1947. In this critical work he takes to task writers such as Paul Scott, Ruth Jhabvala, John Masters, J. G. Farrell, and Kamala Markandaya for their portrayals of Indian characters and culture. Rubin felt that the writers’ inability to construct or convey multidimensional Indian characters helped stoke cultural biases that enabled the British to continue extracting wealth from India with impunity, long after the continent was freed from colonial rule in 1947.

Besides his love for the languages and cultures of India, Rubin collected many bronze statues during his travels. A number of them are now in the collection of the Brooklyn Museum and the Peabody Essex Museum.

== Recognition ==
His first novel, The Greater Darkness, published in 1963, won the British Authors’ Club award for that year's best first novel. His writings are archived at the Howard Gotlieb Archival Research Center at Boston University.

The Greater Darkness was favorably reviewed by a number of publications, including the NY Times, which states that it is a “fine and engrossing Indian first novel.” The Columbia Spectator noted that in The Greater Darkness Rubin's writing is “comparable to the writing of a major symphony by an unknown composer.” The Saturday Review says of this novel, “The author’s descriptions of the beauty of the Taj Mahal and the horror of a stampede and a mass drowning at a holy festival are gripping, and his considerable knowledge of Indian music is put to good use.”

Rubin's two novellas, which were packaged together as Enough of this Lovemaking / Love in the Melon Season, were favorably reviewed by the NY Times, which called them “an entrancing diagram of erotic crosscurrents in an Indian pension.”

Cassio and the Life Divine was said by the Kansas City Star to be “a handsomely written and richly varied novel of romantic intellectual wandering among the contradictions of modern India.” The Cleveland Press proclaimed that “David Rubin’s novel is not, thank God, another tea-party meeting of East and West. It’s an exhilarating collision.” The Christian Science Monitor called Cassio “a good, highly entertaining novel,” while Publishers Weekly dubbed it a “bright, highly unusual novel.”

Not all reviewers were charmed with Rubin. In a 1965 Kirkus review of Cassio the publication noted that the book is, “Inexcusably prolix, egotistical, and ponderous." Of Rubin's novel, Enough of this Lovemaking, Kirkus stated, “It would make a guru-vy satire if Mr. Rubin wasn’t so serious. But by the unfortunate lotus, he is.”

== Bibliography ==
=== Translations ===
- The World of Premchand (Indiana University Press, 1969)
- A Season on the Earth: Selected Poems of Nirala (Columbia University Press, 1977)
- Nepali Visions, Nepali Dreams: The Poetry of Laxmiprasad Devkota (Columbia University Press, 1980)
- Nirmala: A Novel by Premchand (Vision Books, 1988; reprinted as The Second Wife, Orient Paperbacks, 2006)
- Deliverance and Other Stories by Premchand (Penguin, 1988)
- The Return of Sarasvati: Four Hindi Poets (Oxford University Press, 1993)
- The Fire Sacrifice (Havan, by Susham Bedi—Heinemann, 1993)
- Opening Moves (Pahla Parav, by Shrilal Shukla—Penguin, 1993)
- The Return of Sarasvati: Translations of the Poetry of Prasad, Nirala, Pant, and Mahadevi (South Asia Regional Studies, University of Pennsylvania, 1993)
- Widows, Wives and Other Heroines: Twelve Stories by Premchand (Oxford University Press, 1998)
- The World of Premchand (Revised and Expanded Edition, Oxford University Press, 2001)
- A Season on the Earth: Selected Poems of Nirala (Revised Edition, Oxford University Press, 2003)
- Of Love and War: A Chhayavad Anthology (Oxford University Press, 2005)
- The Illustrated Premchand: Selected Short Stories (Oxford University Press, 2006)
- The Fire Sacrifice (Havan, by Susham Bedi, Books India International, 2006) (This edition, by National Publishers, New Delhi, is pirated, unauthorized, and illegal, sold with no remuneration to the translator.)
- Portrait of Mira (Lautna, by Susham Bedi, Books India International, 2006) (This edition, by National Publishers, New Delhi, is an unedited first draft, pirated, unauthorized, and illegal, sold with no remuneration to the translator.)

=== Fiction ===
- The Greater Darkness (Farrar, Straus & Company in the US, Longmans in UK, 1963)
- Cassio and the Life Divine (Farrar, Straus & Giroux in the US, Macmillan in UK, 1966)
- Enough of This Lovemaking / Love in the Melon Season (Simon & Schuster, 1970)
- So Late into the Night (The David Rubin Collection, 2014)
- The Astrologer’s Circle (The David Rubin Collection, 2015)
- The Mountain King (The David Rubin Collection, 2015)
- The Golden American (The David Rubin Collection, 2016)
- The Jacaranda (The David Rubin Collection, 2016)
- Sanderson’s Breakaway (David Rubin Archives, 2016)
- Traveling Light (The David Rubin Collection, 2016)
- Vienna Blood (The David Rubin Collection, 2016)

=== Criticism ===
- After the Raj: British Novels of India since 1947 (University Press of New England, 1986)
