= List of Hindi authors =

This is a list of authors of Hindi literature, i.e. people who write in Hindi language, its dialects and Hindustani language.

== A ==
- Amarkant (1925–2014), novelist
- Amar Goswami (1945–2012), Hindi author and journalist
- Amir Khusro (1253–1325 AD), author of pahelis and mukris in the "Hindavi" dialect
- Acharya Ramlochan Saran (1889–1971), author, grammarian and publisher
- Abid Surti (1935–), author
- Acharya Chatursen Shastri (1891–1960)
- Amrita Pritam (1919–2005)
- Asghar Wajahat (1946-) Hindi scholar, novelist

== B ==
- Bharatendu Harishchandra (1850–1885), the "father of modern Hindi literature"
- Bhadant Anand Kausalyayan (1905–1988)
- Bhisham Sahni (1915–2003), author
- Bhupendra Nath Kaushik (1924–2007), poet, writer, satirist
- Badri Narain Sinha (1930–1979), poet, critic, journalist
- Balendu Dwivedi (1975–), Hindi author
- Bihari (1595–1664), author of Satasai ("Seven Hundred Verses")
- Banarasidas (1586–1643), author of 'Ardhakathanaka', the first biography in Hindi
- Bhagwati Charan Verma (1903–1981), author of Chitralekha and Sahitya Akademy award winning Bhoole Bisre Chitra

== C ==
- Chand Bardai (1148–1191), author of Prithviraj Raso
- Chandrarekha Dhadwal (1951-), Hindi and Pahadi author
- Chandrakiran Sonrexa (1920-2009), author of Chandan Chandni
- Chirag Jain (1985-) Author of Epic "Purushottam"
- Chitra Mudgal (1943–) The first Indian woman to receive the Vyas Samman for her novel "Aavaan".

== D ==
- Darchhawna (1936–2023), Hindi writer and Padma Shri awardee
- Devaki Nandan Khatri (1861–1913), novelist, author of Chandrakanta
- Dharamvir Bharati (1926–1997), Hindi poet, playwright
- Dushyant Kumar (1931–1975), poet of modern Hindustani
- Divya Prakash Dubey (1982–), Hindi author
- Doodhnath Singh (1936–2018), Hindi writer, critic, poet and a recipient of Bharat Bharti Samman

== G ==
- Ganga Das (1823–1913), author of about fifty kavya-granthas and thousands of padas. He is known as Bhismpitama of the Hindi poetry.
- Geetanjali Shree (1957 - ) author of Tomb of Sand (Ret Samadhi) which won the International Booker Prize in 2022
- Gopal Singh Nepali (1911–1963), poet, lyricist
- Gajanan Madhav Muktibodh (1917–1964), modern Hindi poet
- Guru Bhakt Singh 'Bhakt' (1893–1983), "Wordsworth of India"
- Guru Gobind Singh Ji (1666–1708), the tenth Guru of Sikhism
- Babu Gulabrai (1888–1963), philosopher and Hindi writer
- Gopaldas Neeraj (1925–2018), poet and author
- Giriraj Kishore (1937–2020), writer

== H ==
- Hari Joshi (1943–), satirist, novelist, writer, poet
- Harishankar Parsai (1924–1995), satirist
- Harivanshrai Bachchan (1907–2003): Madhushala
- Hazari Prasad Dwivedi (1907–1979), novelist, literary historian
- Hetu Bhardwaj, Hindi fiction writer
- Hrishikesh Sulabh (1955–)

== I ==
- Indira Dangi (1980–), novelist, writer

== J ==
- Jagadguru Shree Kripaluji Maharaj (1922–2013), religious leader
- Jagadguru Swami Rambhadracharya (1950–), spiritual leader, scholar, poet, textual commentator, philosopher and playwright
- Jagdish Piyush (1950–2021), author, writer
- Jaishankar Prasad (1889–1937), poet known for Kamayani
- Jainendra Kumar (1905–1988), author, short story writer
- Janki Ballabh Shastri (1916–2011), poet, author
- Jyotsna Milan (1941–2014), novelist, short story writer, poet and editor

== K ==
- Kabir (1440–1518), poet, figure of the Bhakti movement
- Kavi Bhushan (1613–1712), poet and scholar who mainly wrote in braj bhasha
- Kaka Kalelkar (1885–1961), Gandhian, social reformer, scholar
- Kamleshwar (1932–2007), author, screenwriter, 2003 Sahitya Akademi Award for Kitne Pakistan (2000)
- Kashinath Singh (1937–), novelist, short story writer, 2011 Sahitya Akademi Award for Rehan Par Ragghu (2008), author of Kashi Ka Assi.
- Kedarnath Agarwal (1911–2000), recipient of the Sahitya Akademi Award (1986) for Apurva (poetry collection)
- Kedarnath Singh (1934–2018), modern poet
- Keshavdas (1555–1625), Sanskrit scholar, Hindi poet, author of Rasik Priya
- Krishna Sobti (1925–2019), recipient of Sahitya Akademi Award for the novel Zindaginama
- Kamta Prasad Guru (1875–1947), grammar expert
- Kaifi Azmi (1919–2002)

== L ==
- Lallu Lal (1763–1835), author and translator
- Laxmi Narayan Mishra (1903–1987), playwright

== M ==
- Mudrarakshas ( 1933 - 2016)
- Mirabai (1498–1546/1547), poet
- Malik Muhammad Jayasi (1477–1542), Avadhi poet; author of Padmawat
- Mahadevi Varma (1907–1987), poet, writer, recipient of the Jnanpith Award
- Maithili Sharan Gupt (1886–1964), modern Hindi poet; a pioneer of Khadi boli poetry; author of the epic Saket
- Makhanlal Chaturvedi (1889–1968), poet, playwright, journalist
- Mannu Bhandari (1931–2021), novelist
- Mohan Rakesh (1925–1972), a pioneer of the Nai Kahani ("New Story") literary movement
- Mahavir Prasad Dwivedi (1864–1938), writer, linguist, translator
- Mamta Kalia (1940–), Novelists
- Manohar Shyam Joshi (1933–2006), journalist, screenwriter
- Mehrunnisa Parvez (1944–), Hindi novelist, short story writer and Padma Shri awardee
- Madhur Kapila (1942–), art critic, Hindi writer, recipient of the 2011 Sahitya Akademi Award for contribution to literature
- Mohan Rana (1964–), Hindi poet and philosopher
- Mridula Garg (1938–), short story writer and novelist

== N ==
- Nagarjun (1911–2002), poet, biographer
- Naresh Mehta (1922–2000), one of the pioneers Nakenwad movement
- Nalin Vilochan Sharma (1916–1961), one of the pioneers Nakenwad movement
- Neelam Saxena Chandra (1969–), poet, fiction
- Nirmal Verma (1929–2005), novelist, translator
- Narendra Kohli (1940–2021), credited with reinventing the ancient form of epic writing in modern prose
- Nasira Sharma(1948-) writer, novelist

== P ==
- Pandit Narendra Sharma (1913–1989), poet, lyricist
- Parmanand Adhir (1939–2013), politician, poet, and writer from Jind district in the northern Indian state of Haryana
- Phanishwar Nath 'Renu' (1921–1977), Hindi novelist
- Padma Sachdev (1940–2021), poet, novelist in Hindi and Dogri
- Pran Kumar Sharma (1938–2014), creator of Chacha Choudhary
- Premchand (1880–1936), modern Hindustani literature
- Priyamvad (1952–), writer and historian in Hindi.
- Parichay Das (1964–), writer and editor in contemporary Bhojpuri poetry
- Pankaj Prasun (1984–), writer and poet of Satire poetry

== R ==
- Ram Ratan Bhatnagar (1914–1992), writer, literary critic
- Ramesh Chandra Jha (1928–1994), poet, novelist
- Raghuvir Sahay (1929–1990), poet, translator, short-story writer and journalist
- Rahi Masoom Raza (1927–1992), writer, lyricist
- Rajkamal Choudhary (1929–1967), poet, short story writer, novelist, critic
- Rahul Sankrityayan (1893–1963), the "father of Hindi travel literature"
- Ravidas (1398–1448), guru, songwriter
- Rajendra Prasad Singh (1964–), Hindi author, critic and linguist
- Rajendra Mishra (1919–1979), Hindi author, critic
- Rajendra Yadav (1929–2013), pioneer of "Nayi Kahani" movement
- Rajinder Singh Bedi (1915–1984), writer, screenwriter
- Ramdhari Singh Dinkar (1908–1974), nationalist poet, essayist
- Ramnarayan Yadavendu (1909–1951), writer, fictionist, essayist and social reformer
- Ram Vilas Sharma (1912–2000), literary critic
- Ramvriksh Benipuri (1899–1968), writer
- Rangeya Raghav (1923–1962), writer
- Raskhan (1533–1618), poet
- Rustam Singh (1955–), poet, philosopher, translator and editor
- Rabindranath Tagore (1861–1941), writer, poet, and musician
- Rati Saxena ( 1954-) Poet, Translator, Writer, Editor

== S ==
- Sahajanand Saraswati (1889–1950), writer, scholar
- Sachchidananda Vatsyayan (1911–1987) ("Agyeya"), recipient of the Sahitya Akademi Award, and Jnanpith Award
- Sarveshwar Dayal Saxena (1927–1983), recipient of the Sahitya Akademi Award, 1983
- Sharad Joshi (1931–1991), satirist, screenwriter
- Shekhar Joshi (1939–2022), Hindi author
- Acharya Shivpujan Sahay (1893–1963), writer of novels and prose
- Sri Lal Sukla (1925–2011), satirist
- Sumitranandan Pant (1900–1977), Hindi poet
- Surdas (1467–1583), composer
- Sūdan (1700–1753), author and poet
- Shankar Dayal Singh (1937–1995)
- Yagyadutt Sharma (1916–1993), Hindi novelist, writer and poet
- Subhadra Kumari Chauhan (1904–1948), poet, songwriter
- Suryakant Tripathi 'Nirala' (1896–1961), poet and author
- Safdar Hashmi (1889–1954), author, street theatre, activist
- Shyam Narayan Pandey (1907–1991), Hindi poet
- Saadat Hassan Manto (1912–1955), Hindi author
- Surender Mohan Pathak (1940–), Hindi author
- Sudama Panday 'Dhoomil' (1936–1975), Hindi poet, recipient of 1979 Sahitya Akademi Award for Kal Sunana Mujhe

== T ==
- Teji Grover (1955–), poet, fiction writer, translator and painter
- Tulsidas (1532–1623), author of Shrī Rāmcharitmānas

== U ==
- Usha Priyamvada (1930–), novelist, short-story writer, translator

== V ==
- Vidyapati (1352–1448), a prominent poet of Eastern dialects
- Vishnu Prabhakar (1912–2009), recipient of the Sahitya Akademi Award for the novel Ardhanarishvara
- Vibhuti Narain Rai (1951–), novelist
- Viveki Rai (1924–2016), novelist
- Vrindavan Lal Verma (1889–1969), historical novelist
- Vidya Niwas Mishra (1926–2005), scholar, journalist
- Vrind (1643–1723), Braj bhasha poet

== Y ==
- Yashpal (1903–1976), novelist, author, Jhutha Sach (The False Truth, 1958–1960)

== See also ==
- List of Hindi-language poets
