= Malihabadi Dusseheri Mango =

Mango cultivar from Uttar Pradesh, India

Mangifera 'Malihabadi Dusseheri'
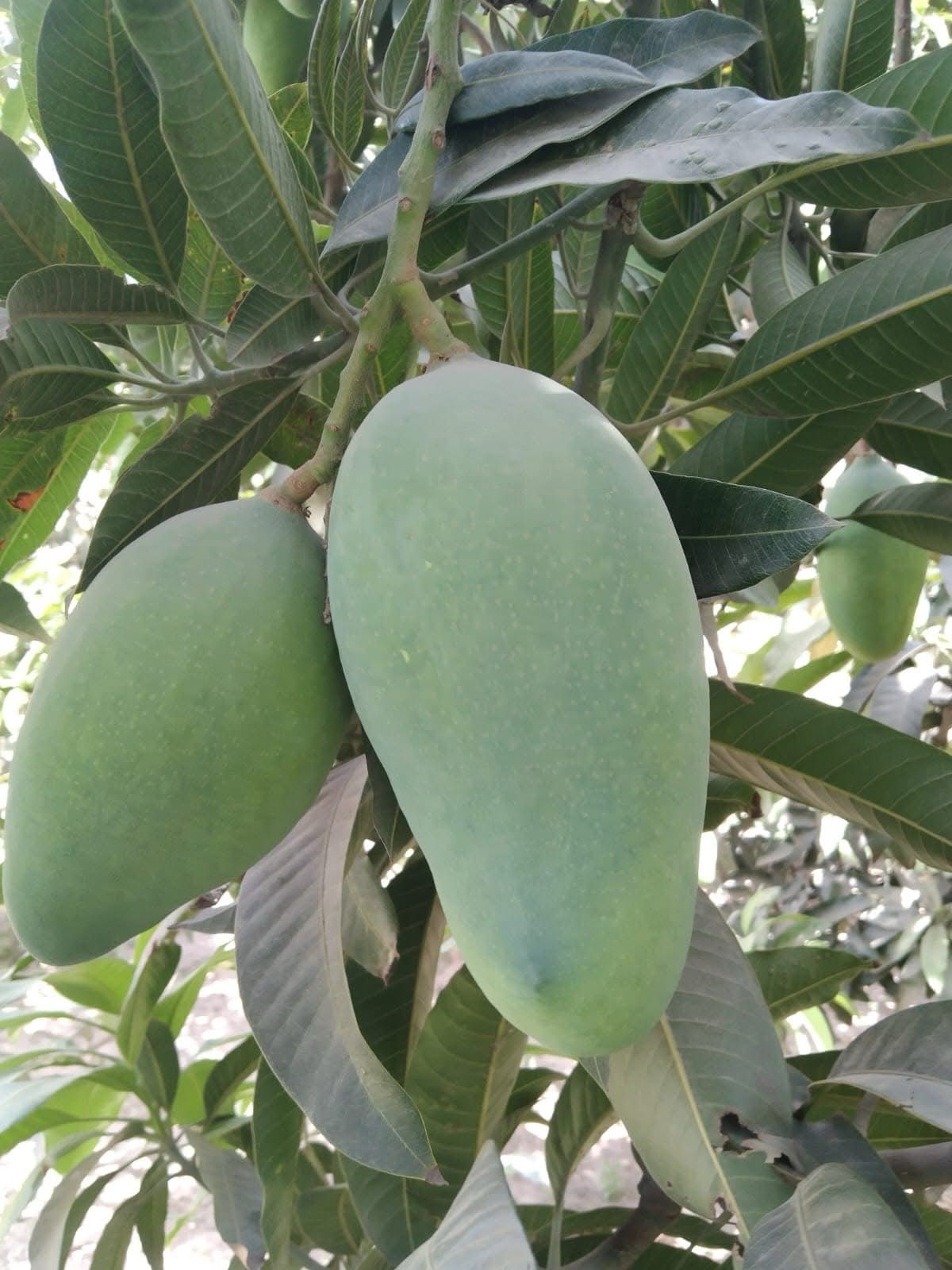
- Close-up of unplucked Malihabadi Dusseheri Mangoes
- Genus: Mangifera
- Species: Mangifera indica
- Cultivar: 'Malihabadi Dusseheri'
- Origin: India

The 'Malihabadi Dusseheri' mango, is a mango cultivar primarily grown in the town of Malihabad, Lucknow district of Uttar Pradesh, India. The Malihabadi Dusseheri mangoes are unique from the Dussehri variety grown elsewhere in India.

== Name ==
The Malihabadi Dusseheri mango's legacy began in Lucknow Nawab's royal gardens during the 1700s. The original mother plant, estimated to be 200 years old, still blossoms in Dashaari village located under Kakori town, between Malihabad and Lucknow, the epicenter of this mango variety.

== Description ==
This mango variety boasts a small to medium-sized elongated fruit, sporting a vibrant yellow colour, with fibreless pulp, distinctive rich flavor, and excellent storage durability.

=== Uniqueness ===
Malihabad's traditional mango growers claim that 'Dusseheri' mangoes grown elsewhere lack the region's signature characteristics.

== Photo gallery ==
Photos provided from the farms of Padma Shri winner Kaleemullah Khan, horticulturist and fruit breeder, from Malihabad.

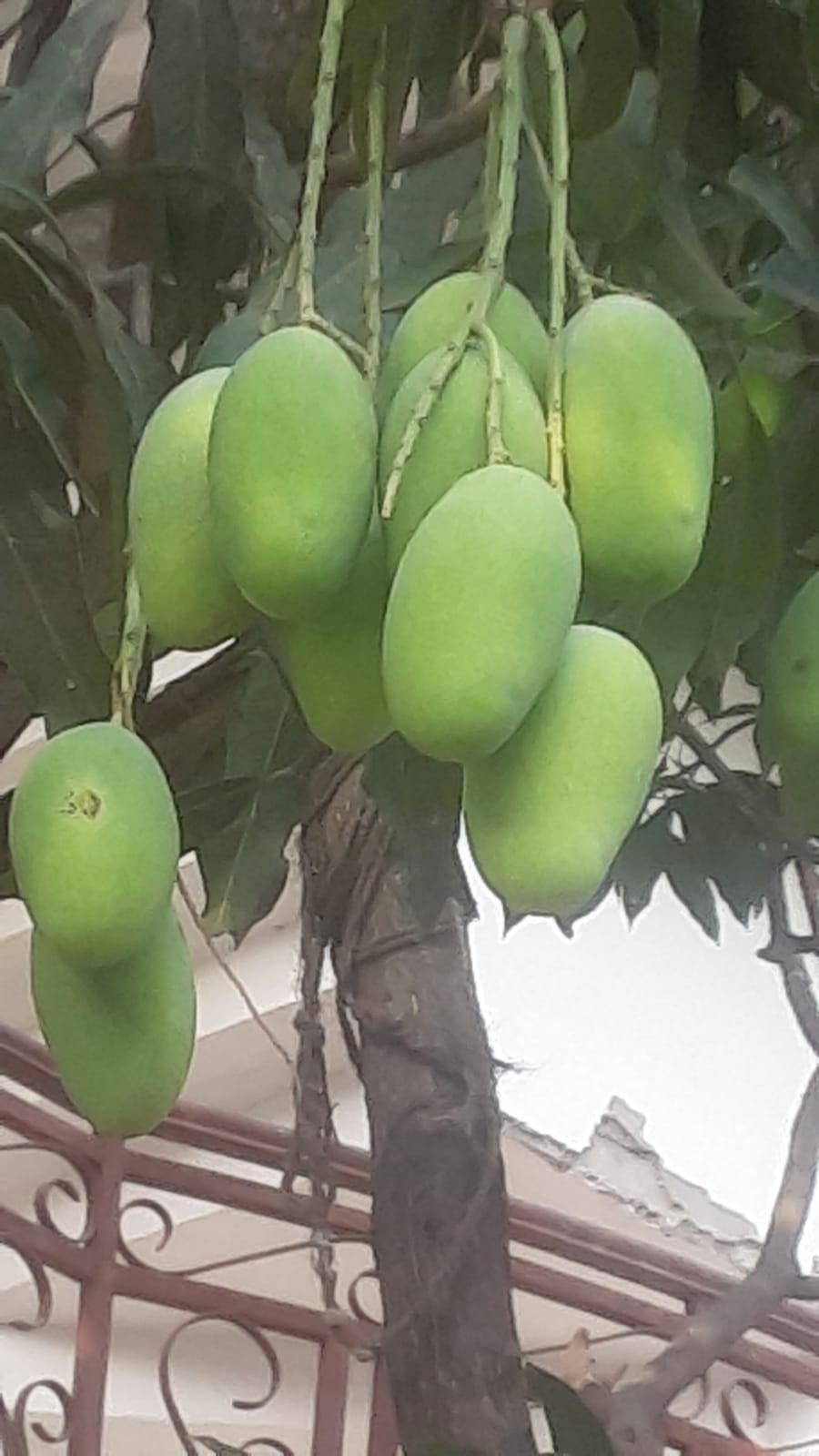
Unplucked Malihabadi Dusseheri Mangoes

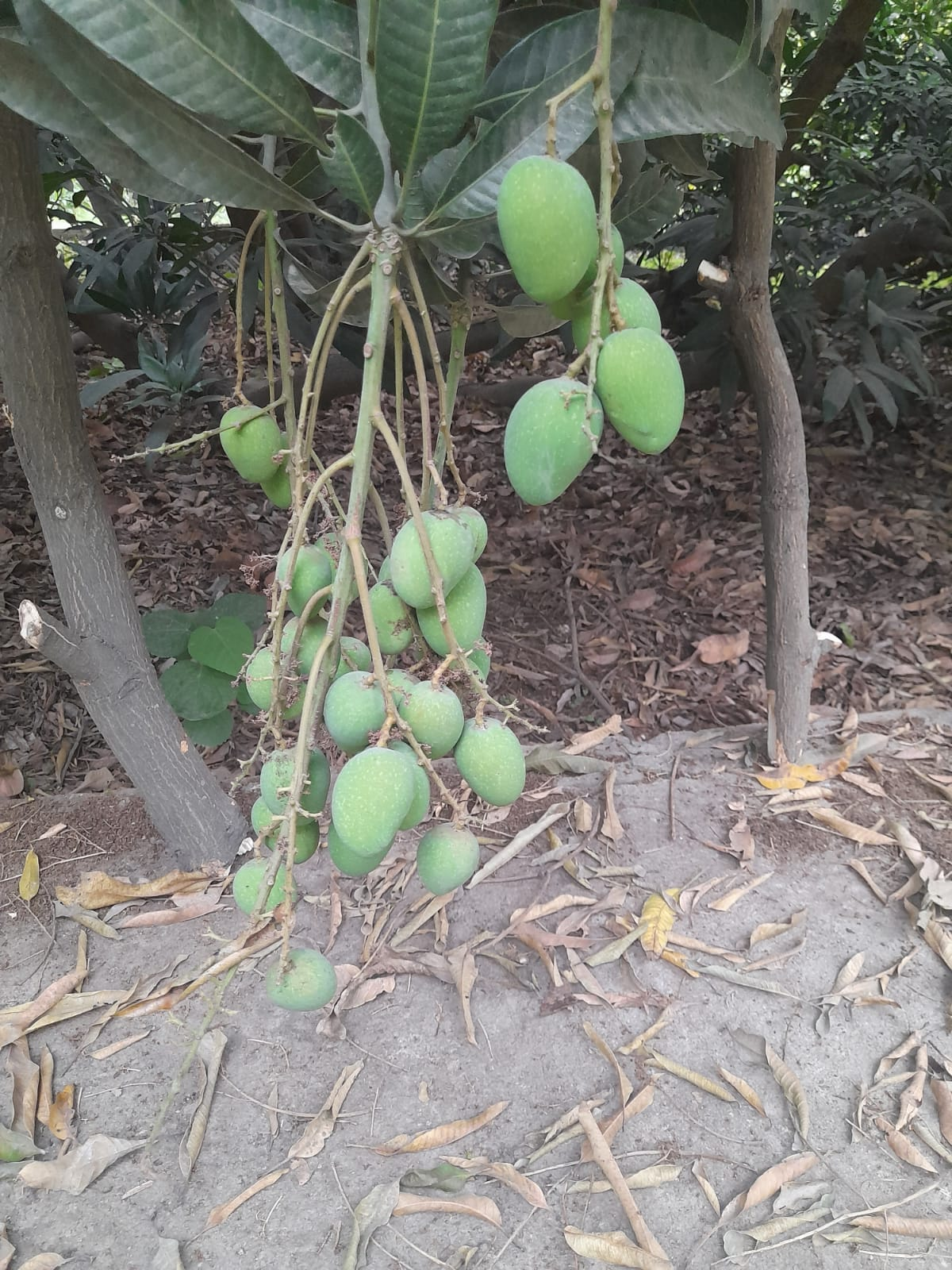
Another photo of Unplucked Malihabadi Dusseheri Mangoes

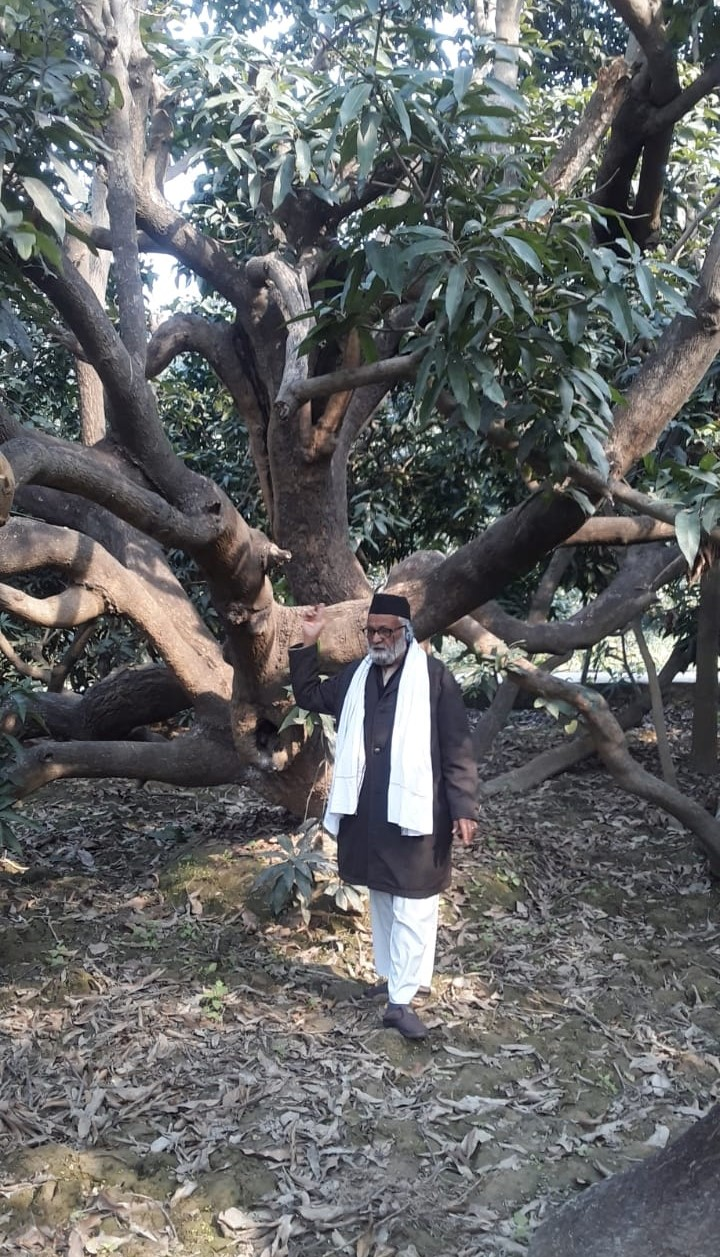
Padmashri winner and an expert mango grower Kaleemullah Khan at his farm at Malihabad

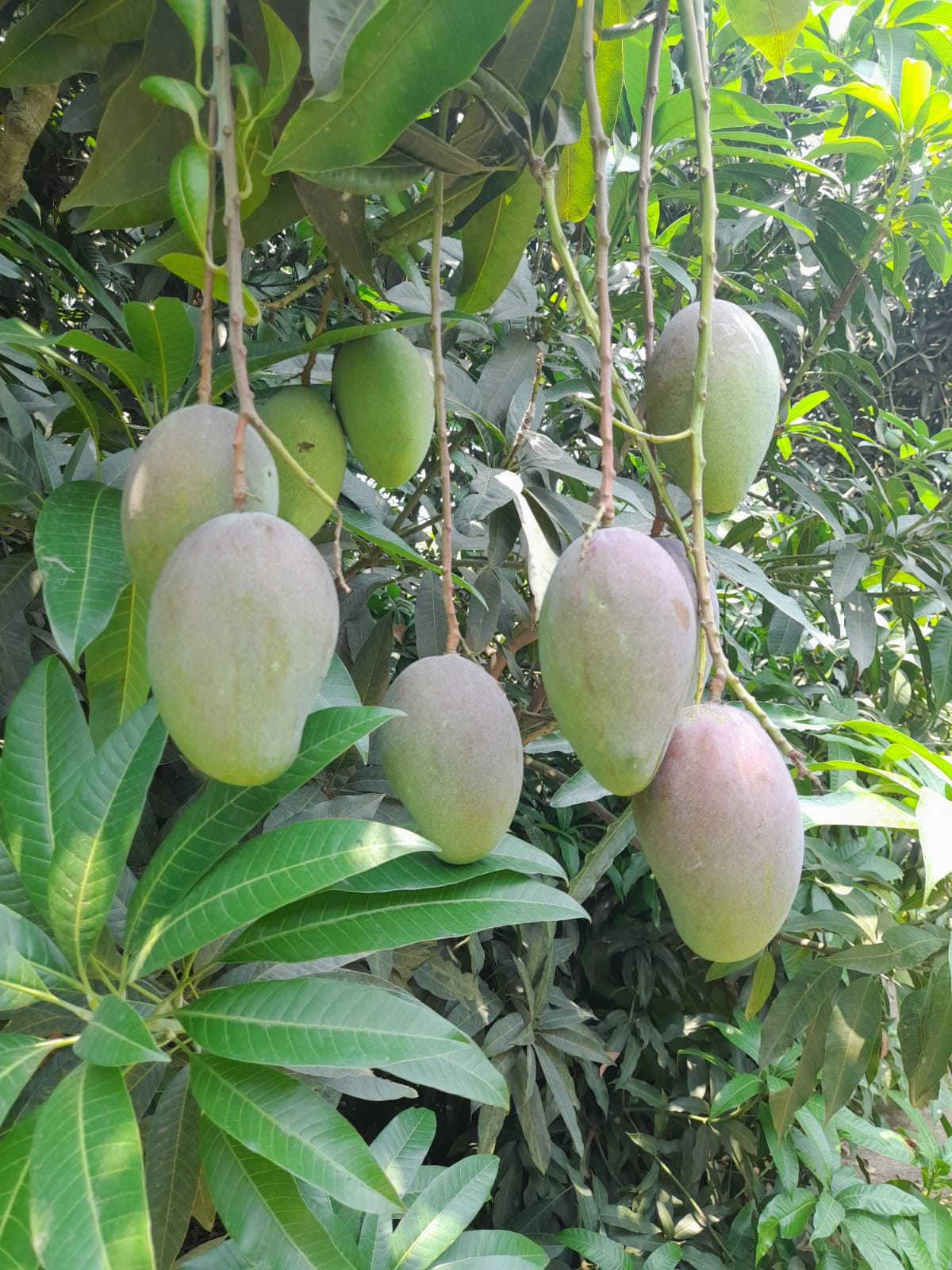
Semi-ripe Malihabadi Dusseheri Mangoes

== Geographical indication ==
It was awarded the Geographical Indication (GI) status tag from the Geographical Indications Registry under the Union Government of India on 4 September 2009 (valid until 14 May 2028).

National Horticulture Board from Gurgaon proposed the GI registration of the Malihabadi Dusseheri mango. After filing the application in 2008, the fruit was granted the GI tag in 2009 by the Geographical Indication Registry in Chennai, making the name "Malihabadi Dusseheri" exclusive to the mangoes grown in the region. It thus became the first mango variety from Uttar Pradesh and fourth mango variety from India to earn the GI tag.

== See also ==
- List of mango cultivars
- List of Geographical Indications in India
