= Bhakt Singh =

Bhakt Singh may refer to:

- Bhakht Singh (Brother) (1903–2000), Evangelist and founder of Hebron Ministries.
- Bakht Singh (Maharaja) (1706–1752), ruler of present-day Rajasthan, India
- Guru Bhakt Singh 'Bhakt' (1893–1983), Indian poet and dramatist
