= Rajendra Prasad Singh =

Rajendra Prasad Singh may also to:

- Rajendra Prasad Singh (footballer), Indian footballer
- Rajendra Prasad Singh (linguist)
- Rajendra Prasad Singh (Bihar and Jharkhand politician)
- Rajendra Prasad Singh (Birbhum politician)
