= Sheoraj Singh Bechain =

Indian writer

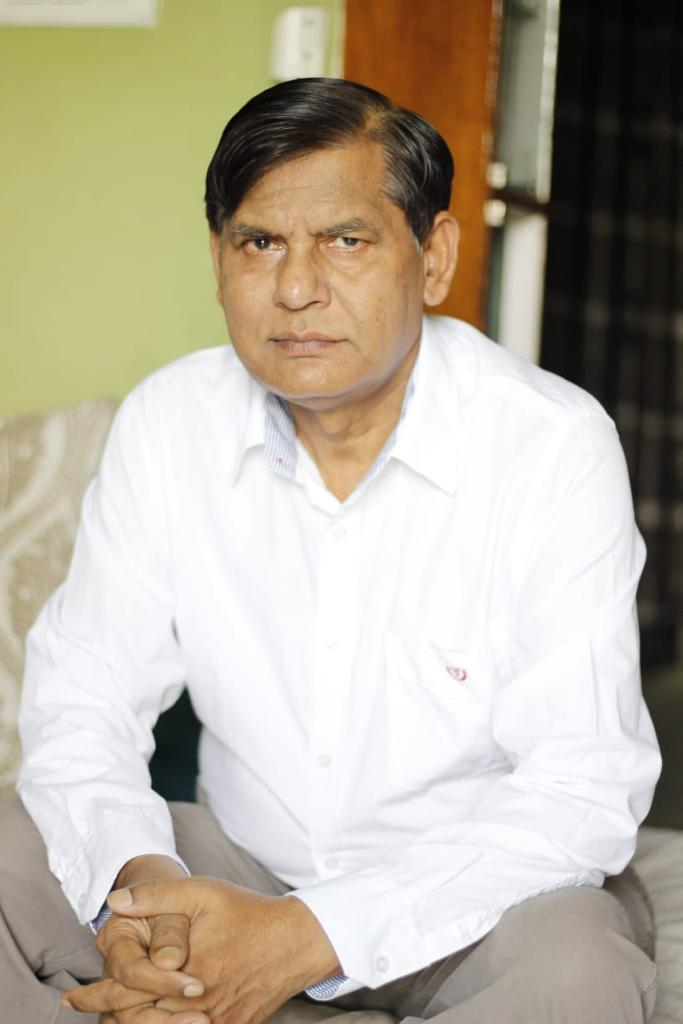
- Born: 5 January 1960; Budaun, Uttar Pradesh, India
- Education: Mahatma Jyotiba Phule Rohilkhand University
- Occupations: Writer and Professor
- Writing career
- Genre: Fiction
- Subject: Literature

Sheoraj Singh Bechain is an Indian poet, short story writer, and essayist. When he started writing and progressing academically, he adopted the pen name "Bechain". He was appointed Professor on an unreserved position in the Department of Hindi at the University of Delhi in 2010 and became the first Dalit Professor in the department. He is currently serving as the Head of the Hindi Department at the University.

Bechain has written more than two dozen books in Hindi. The most well-known of his writings is his autobiography Mera Bachpan Mere Kandhon Par, published by Vani Prakashan in 2009.

His career includes teaching, researching and writing. He is a regular contributor of articles to national newspapers and magazines. His Ph.D. thesis Hindi Dalit Patrakarita Par Patrakar Ambedkar Ka Prabhav, which was published as a book, was mentioned in the Limca Book of Records in 1999. His other notable works include Kronch Hoon Main, Bhor Ke Andhere Me, Nai Fasal, Meri Priya Kahaniyaan, Haath to Ug hi Aate Hain, Mook Nayak Ke Sau Saal Aur Asmita Sangharsh Ke Sawal and Hindi Dalit Patrakarita Par Patrakar Ambedkar Ka Prabhav.

== Early life ==
He was born into an extremely poor family of Chamar caste on 5 January 1960 in the village of Nadroli in Budaun district, Uttar Pradesh, India.

His father died when he was around 5 to 6 years old. As leather workers and landless agricultural laborers where no one was literate before his generation, the members of his family had no source of income after the death of his father, who had been its sole wage-earner and suffered from acute financial distress. Bechain had to travel to several places in North India and worked as a child labourer at different times for his survival. He along with his mother, brother and sister worked on agricultural farms in Bajpur. When he went to Delhi, he again took up several small jobs to sustain himself in the big city. He kept up with his studies. His experiences as a child labourer are recorded in his autobiography, Mera Bachpan Mere Kandhon Par ("My Childhood on My Shoulders").

== Education ==
Bechain has a postgraduate degree (M.A.) in Hindi literature, and a B.Ed. from Rohilkhand University. He passed the UGC NET test in 1992. He was awarded a Ph.D degree on his work "Hindi ki Dalit Patrkarita Par Patrkar Ambedkar ka Prabhav" in 1995. He was awarded a D.Litt. on 'Non Dalit Hindi Novels' in 2007.

== My Childhood On My Shoulders ==
His autobiography 'Mera Bachpan Mere Kandhon Par' was translated into English titled My Childhood on My Shoulders and published by Oxford University Press in 2018.

The book narrates a tale of a Dalit's life and describes different aspects of social humiliation in the Indian caste system. As a story of a child labourer, it gained wide attention from Indian media. It was debated at the Jaipur Literature Festival in 2013.

The second part of the book is yet to be released.

== Editorship ==
Sheoraj Singh 'Bechain' was the Chief Editor of the magazine Bahur Nahi Awana. He was guest editor of a special Dalit Issue of Hans magazine in August 2004, and was the editor of 'Dalit Prakriya' monthly and 'Samay Sarokar' magazine.

== Journalism ==
Bechain is a regular contributor for Amar Ujala, Dainik Hindustan, Jansatta, and Rashtriya Sahara. He started his writing career as a columnist with Amar Ujala in 1987.

== Adaptations ==
His story 'Ashthiyon Ke Akshar' was adapted into a play by the National School of Drama in New Delhi. The play was staged in 2004 in the NSD where the writer was invited to deliver a speech.

== Awards ==
Bechain has received the following awards:

- International Literary Award, Paris, France in 2014.
- 'Subramanian Bharti National Literary Award' by President of India, Pranab Mukherjee in 2016
- 'Sahitya Bhushan Samman' from Hindi Sansthan, Lucknow in 2007
- 'National Baba Saheb Bhim Rao Ambedkar Smriti Samman' from Mhow (Madhya Pradesh) in 2002
- 'National Rashtra Bhasha Gaurav Samman' in 2014
- 'Dr. Ambedkar National Award' in 2014
- 'National Kabir Sewa Samman' in 1997
- 'National Bhim Ratan Award' in 2008
- ‘Gadya Vidya Samman' of Hindi Academy, Delhi, 2019
- 'Guru Ghasidas Samman' in 2018
- Nai Dhara Rachna Samman in 2019
- Sant Ram B.A. Samman - 2019

== Notable works ==
- 'Meri Priya Kahaniyaan', Rajpal and Sons, New Delhi, Edition - 2019, ISBN 9789389373059.
- 'Media Me Samajik Loktantra Ki Talash', Anamika Publishers and Distributors, New Delhi, Edition - 2022
- 'Muknayak Ke 100 Saal Aur Asmita Sangharsh Ke Sawal', MUC Publications, Soniya Vihar, Delhi, Edition - 2022, ISBN 9789391798567
- 'Hath To Ug Hi Aate Hain', Vani Prakashan, New Delhi, Edition - 2020
- 'Chamar Ki Chai', Vani Prakashan, New Delhi, Edition - 2017, ISBN 9789352296064
- 'Bhor Ke Andhere Me', Vani Prakashan, New Delhi, Edition - 2018, ISBN 9789387648906
- 'Dalit Sahitya Aur Samajik Nyay' (Edited), IIAS, Shimla, Edition - 2014
- 'Mera Bachpan Mere Kandhon Par', Vani Prakashan, New Delhi, Edition - 2009
- 'My Childhood on My Shoulders', Oxford University Press, Edition - 2018
- 'Samkalin Hindi Patrakarita Me Dalit Uvach', Anamika Publishers and Distributors, New Delhi, ISBN 8179751570
- 'Ambedkar, Gandhi Aur Dalit Patrakarita', Anamika Publishers and Distributors, New Delhi, 2010
- 'Nai Fasal Aur Anya Kavitayen', Vani Prakashan, New Delhi, Edition - 1989.
- 'Bharose Ki Bahan', Vani Prakashan, New Delhi, Edition - 2010
- 'Dalit Kranti Ka Sahitya', Samta Prakashan, Shahdara, Delhi-32, Edition - 2019
- 'Hindi Dalit Patrakarita Par Patrakar Ambedkar Ka Prabhav', Samta Prakashan, Shahdara, New Delhi, Edition - 1998
- 'Jindagi ko dhundte hue', Vani prakashan, Dariyaganj, Delhi, 2024

== Personal life ==
Bechain is married with two children.
