= Darchhawna =

Indian writer and historian (1936–2023)

- Born: 26 January 1936; Lushai Hills, Assam Province, British India
- Died: 27 December 2023 (aged 87); Kulikawn, Aizawl, Mizoram, India
- Occupations: Writer, historian
- Awards: Padma Shri

Darchhawna (26 January 1936 – 27 December 2023) was an Indian writer of Hindi literature and historian from the Northeast Indian state of Mizoram.

== Early life and education ==
Darchhawna was born on 26 January 1936. Darchhawna received a diploma in music and adult education training. He later earned a Master of Arts and an honorary Doctorate of Literature. He attended St. Antony's College, the Theological College Sydney and the Melbourne College of Divinity. He further studied in California. He started his career as the headmaster of Thingsai High School in 1960 before becoming a lecturer at PMG college. He later served as a principal of Lunglei COllege, Pachhunga University College and Johnson College.

== Career ==
Darchhawna was president of the Mizoram Hindi Prachar Sabha from 1980 to 2001 and worked to propagate Hindi in Mizoram. Darchhawna established 50 Prachar centres, eight schools and one Rastrabhasha Mahavidyalaya. Darchhawna also contributed and participated in All India Radio and Doordarshan since 1963.

Darchhawna served as a member on the General Council of the Sahitya Akademi from 1991-1996 alongside the Sangeet Natak Akademi from 1990-1992. He was also a fellow of the lalit Kala Akademi and the United Writer's Association from 1992-1994. He then worked in the Hindi Salahakar Samiti from 2001-2003 alongside the Hindi Literature Selection Board from 2001-2002. Darchhawna was an Officer on Special Duty at the Mizoram University, when it was the Mizoram campus of the North Eastern Hill University (NEHU) and the founder President of the Mizo History Association. He held the post of the president of the organization for several terms, after getting elected in 2013. The Government of India awarded him the fourth highest civilian honour of the Padma Shri, in 2005, for his contributions to Indian literature.

== Death ==
Darchhawna died on 27 December 2023, at the age of 87. His funeral was held at his residence in Kulikawn, Aizawl.

== Selected works ==
- Music Zirna [Rudiments of Music] (1970)
- Thim ata Enga [From Darkness to Light] (1974)
- Zirtitu [Teacher] (1974)
- Naupang Zirlaibu [Junior Lesson] (1975)
- Baptist Inkaihhruaina [Baptist Principles] (1976)
- Music Theory (1984)
- Khawthlang Music and Mizo Culture [Western Music and Mizo Culture] (1992)
- Mizo culture (1993)
- Kohran Thurain [Doctrine of the Church] (1998)
- Kum Sang Rorel [Millennial Kingdom] (1998)
- Beisei Ram [My Literary Works](1999)
- Kohran Chanchin [Church History] (1999)
- Upate Rangbawlna [Senior Citizens and their Participation in Society] (2002)
- Khawvel history and culture [World history and culture] (2002)
- Hla Siamtu Hmingthangte [A Gallery of Great Musicians] (2003)
- Savidge Leh Lorrain-Te Mizo Literature ah an Hnathawh [Contributions of Savidge and Lorrain on Mizo literature] (2004)
- Music Dictionary (2004)

== Awards ==
- 1998: Best Citizen of India award
- 1999: Bharat Jyoti Award
- 1999:Presidential award for Hindi Language propagation
- 2005: Padma Shri for his contributions to Indian literature.
- Mizo Sahitya Academy

== See also ==
- Hindi literature
- List of Hindi-language authors

== Sources ==
Guptā, Ramaṇikā (2006). Indigenous Writers of India: North-East India. New Delhi: Concept Publishing Company. pp. 158–159. ISBN 81-8069-299-X.
