= Balendu Dwivedi =

Indian writer

- बालेन्दु द्विवेदी
- Born: 1 December 1975 (age 50); Brahmpur, Gorakhpur district, Uttar Pradesh, India
- Education: University of Allahabad
- Occupations: Novelist, critic, screenwriter, film director, civil servant
- Writing career
- Language: Hindi
- Genres: Satire, historical fiction, literary criticism, biography
- Notable work: Madaripur Junction
- Website: balendudwivedi.in

Balendu Dwivedi (born 1 December 1975) is an Indian novelist, short-story writer and literary critic who writes in the Hindi language, and a screenwriter and director of feature films and documentaries. He is best known for his satirical novels of rural and small-town northern India, beginning with his debut Madaripur Junction (2017), a work widely compared in the Hindi press to Shrilal Shukla's Raag Darbari. His written work spans the novel, drama, the short story, literary criticism, travel writing and literary biography. Alongside these pursuits he is an officer of the Provincial Civil Service (allied) of the Government of Uttar Pradesh.

== Early life and education ==
Dwivedi was born on 1 December 1975 in Brahmpur, a village in the Gorakhpur district of Uttar Pradesh, in the region historically associated with the Chauri Chaura uprising of 1922. The rural society of eastern Uttar Pradesh in which he was raised, its dialects, folklore and social fabric, later became the principal setting and subject of his fiction. He completed his higher education in Prayagraj (Allahabad), where he took a postgraduate degree, and has described the literary and intellectual atmosphere of the city, long a centre of Hindi letters, as a formative influence on his sensibility.

== Career ==
=== Civil service ===
Dwivedi joined the Provincial Civil Service (allied) of the Government of Uttar Pradesh and has served as a District Minority Welfare Officer. In the manner of Shrilal Shukla, who wrote from within the administration, he has drawn on his close experience of officialdom, governance and rural power structures in his satirical fiction.

=== Literary career ===
Dwivedi's first novel, Madaripur Junction, was published in 2017 by Vani Prakashan. A satire set in a fictional village-and-town in eastern Uttar Pradesh, it portrays caste conflict, social hypocrisy and the everyday politics of rural India, tracing the gradual awakening of the so-called lower-caste communities against entrenched upper-caste dominance. Reviewers received it as a contemporary successor to the tradition of Shrilal Shukla's Raag Darbari, noting echoes of Premchand and Harishankar Parsai, and the novel established Dwivedi as a significant new voice in Hindi fiction. It was launched by the writer Taslima Nasreen at the Indore Literature Festival, and has since been translated into Odia.

His second novel, Vaya Fursatganj (2021), is set in a village near Allahabad. Its narrative turns on the accidental death of Pareshan Ali, the unemployed son of Halkan Mian, who falls into a well one night together with his goat. What begins as a trivial incident swells into a political spectacle as rival leaders and factions each seek to claim and exploit it; through this episode the novel offers a sustained satire of the opportunism of contemporary Indian politics.

Dwivedi has also edited Premchand: Priya Kathakar Ki Amar Kahaniyan, a compilation of twenty-one stories by Munshi Premchand, whom he has named as the decisive influence on his turn to literature. His play Mrityubhoj, which examines the social custom of the funerary feast, has been published and staged; his edited collection Ek Tha Manto gathers the fiction of Saadat Hasan Manto; and his work of literary criticism Parampara Mein Jeevan Ki Khoj engages with the Hindi critical tradition associated with Acharya Ramchandra Shukla.

He has since announced an extensive body of forthcoming work, including a continuation of the Madaripur cycle (Madaripur Returns and Madaripur Once Again), a sequence of historical novels on the freedom struggle and Partition, critical biographies of the Urdu poets Faiz Ahmed Faiz, Ahmed Faraz and Jaun Elia, edited selections of classical Urdu verse, a memoir of travels in Europe, and a biography of the film-music composers Laxmikant–Pyarelal.

=== Filmmaking ===
Dwivedi has also worked as a screenwriter and director. His feature film Bioscope Zindagi and his documentaries, among them Kashi's Manikarnika: Mystique and Moksha, Ramnami: In Search of Lord Ram and The Second Self, engage with folk performance, religious tradition and the regional cultures of north and central India.

== Literary works ==
=== Published works ===
Novels

- Madaripur Junction (Vani Prakashan, 2017)
- Vaya Fursatganj (2021)
- Badshah Salamat Hazir Hon..!

Drama

- Mrityubhoj

Edited short-story collections

- Premchand: Priya Kathakar Ki Amar Kahaniyan (selected stories of Premchand)
- Ek Tha Manto (selected stories of Saadat Hasan Manto)

Literary criticism

- Parampara Mein Jeevan Ki Khoj

A number of further works have been announced as forthcoming or in progress, as noted above.

== Filmography ==
As writer and director:

- Bioscope Zindagi, feature film
- Kashi's Manikarnika: Mystique and Moksha, documentary
- The Second Self, based on the Launda Naach folk-performance tradition
- Ramnami: In Search of Lord Ram, documentary on the Ramnami community of Chhattisgarh
- The Womb of the River

== Style and themes ==
Dwivedi's fiction is marked by its command of the dialects and idiom of eastern Uttar Pradesh and by a characteristic fusion of sharp social satire with underlying compassion. Critics have repeatedly placed his work within the satirical lineage of Shrilal Shukla, Premchand, Harishankar Parsai and Gyan Chaturvedi. Across his non-fiction and his films he returns to a consistent set of preoccupations: the Urdu–Persian poetic tradition, the history of Hindi film music, religious and ritual practice, and the folk-narrative and performance traditions of northern and central India.

== Awards and recognition ==
- Madaripur Junction: Amritlal Nagar Sarjana Samman (2017), Uttar Pradesh Hindi Sansthan
- Sahitya Parikrama Samman (2018), Akhil Bharatiya Sahitya Parishad, Uttar Pradesh
- Amritlal Nagar Puraskar (2018–19), Rajya Karmchari Sahitya Sansthan, Uttar Pradesh
- Madaripur Junction named among the five best novels of the year (2018), Valley of Words, Uttarakhand
- Madaripur Junction included among the best Hindi scripts at the MAMI Film Festival, Mumbai (2018)
- Writer of the Year (2019), Jashn-e-Adab, New Delhi
