= Dashaari =

- village
- Location in Uttar Pradesh, India Dashaari (India)
- Coordinates: 26.87°N 80.82°E
- Country: India
- State: Uttar Pradesh
- District: Lucknow

Population (2011 Census of India)
  - Total: 2,270

Languages
  - Official: Hindi
- Time zone: UTC+5:30 (IST)
- PIN: 226101

Dashaari is a village in Kakori Panchayat, Lucknow district, Uttar Pradesh, India. Dussehri or Dasheri are the variations of the same name. Located approximately 21 kilometers from Lucknow, the village lies near Kakori, within the Mohanlalganj constituency.

== Notability ==
Dashaari village has the iconic 'Dussehri Mother Plant', a majestic 200-year-old tree credited with propagating the beloved Dussehri mango variety across India. The village name is coined into the GI-tagged mango variety of Malihabadi Dusseheri Mango which got certification in 2009.
