= Bhaliya =

- village
- Location in Uttar Pradesh, India Bhaliya (India)
- Coordinates: 26.85°N 80.74°E
- Country: India
- State: Uttar Pradesh
- District: Lucknow

Population (2011 Census of India)
  - Total: 2,550

Languages
  - Official: Hindi
- Time zone: UTC+5:30 (IST)
- PIN: 226101

Bhaliya is a village in Kakori Panchayat, Lucknow district, Uttar Pradesh, India. According to 2011 Census of India the population of the village is 2,550 out of 1,336 are males and 1,214 are females. Its village code is 143401. It is the seat of a gram panchayat.
