= Dashdoi =

- village
- Location in Uttar Pradesh, India Dashdoi (India)
- Coordinates: 26.86°N 80.76°E
- Country: India
- State: Uttar Pradesh
- District: Lucknow

Population (2011 Census of India)
  - Total: 2,270

Languages
  - Official: Hindi
- Time zone: UTC+5:30 (IST)
- PIN: 226101

Dashdoi is a village in Kakori Panchayat, Lucknow district, Uttar Pradesh, India. According to 2011 Census of India the population of the village is 2,270 out of 1,227 are males and 1,043 are females.
