= Anwar (2007 film) =

2007 Indian romantic thriller film

- Theatrical release poster
- Directed by: Manish Jha
- Written by: Manish Jha
- Story by: Manish Jha
- Based on: Falgun Ki Ek Upkatha by Priyamvad
- Produced by: Rajesh Singh; Sanjiv Jaiswal
- Starring: Siddharth Koirala; Manisha Koirala; Nauheed Cyrusi
- Cinematography: Kartik Vijay
- Edited by: Amitabh Shukla
- Music by: Mithoon; Pankaj Awasthi
- Distributed by: Dayal Creations Pvt. Ltd.
- Release date: 12 January 2007
- Running time: 144 minutes
- Country: India
- Language: Hindi
- Budget: ₹3 crore
- Box office: ₹12 lakh

Anwar is a 2007 Indian Hindi-language romantic thriller film written and directed by Manish Jha, starring Nepalese actor Siddharth Koirala in the titular role, along with his sister Manisha Koirala, Nauheed Cyrusi, Vijay Raaz, Yashpal Sharma, Rajpal Yadav and Hiten Tejwani. The film, independently produced by Dayal Creations Pvt. Ltd, is inspired by the short story Falgun Ki Ek Upkatha written by Priyamvad, and follows a young Muslim man who is mistakenly trapped in a temple by police and accused of terrorism, while he reminisces about his tragic past love story.

Anwar was released on 12 January 2007, receiving praise for its music and cinematography while the criticism was aimed at its multiple subplots. While the film was a commercial failure, its songs "Maula Mere Maula" and "Tose Naina Laage" became chartbusters.

== Plot ==
Anwar is from a middle-class Muslim family in Lucknow, India, living with his mother and sister Suraiya. Anwar is researching ancient Hindu temples. The family rents out a room to a poor widow and her daughter, Mehru, whom Anwar falls in love with.

Anwar is certain of Mehru's love for him, but Mehru has her heart set on settling in America. She is tired of the dust, the summer heat, and the struggles and tragedy of her poverty-stricken country. Anwar tells Mehru it is not possible for him to take her to the U.S. Even if he works all day, it is impossible and out of his financial reach. Mehru expresses her interest in Udit, an engineer who has plans to settle in America. Mehru begins a relationship with Udit, which one day is revealed to Anwar.

Anwar visits Udit, who tells him of his plan to marry Mehru before going to the US as his visa is ready. Anwar tells him that he should think once again before doing this because of the difference in their religion, as Mehru is a Muslim and Udit is a follower of Hinduism. If Mehru's strict and conservative family members come to know about this, they will shatter the dreams of Mehru and Udit, and their lives will not be spared. Seeing that Udit has ignored his warning, Anwar confesses his feelings to Mehru when they meet on the terrace, and he begs her not to leave him. He cannot imagine his life without her, but Mehru says that she never loved Anwar. Mehru runs away with Udit. Later, seeing Mehru's mother cry her heart out for her daughter, Anwar impulsively tells her and the family that she has run away with a Hindu man. Mehru's uncle, along with 2 other men, finds the two youngsters, shoots Udit, and brings the injured Mehru back home. Mehru commits suicide at the tragedy of Udit's death. A guilt-ridden Anwar takes shelter in an ancient Hindu temple in Dholpur, carrying a bag containing drawings of mandirs and notes on Krishna, Mirabai, and Mehru. This bag ends up with the police, who come to the conclusion that Anwar is a terrorist who is planning to detonate bombs in sacred Hindu temples.

The temple is surrounded by the police, politicians who are anxious to win the Hindu vote, the media, and a huge crowd drawn by the spectacle. In the end, Anwar is fatally shot by the cops, and while dying, he has a vision of himself as Krishna and Mehru as Mirabai, reuniting with each other.

== Cast ==
- Siddharth Koirala as Anwar
- Nauheed Cyrusi as Mehreen "Mehru"
- Manisha Koirala as Anita
- Rajpal Yadav as Gopinath
- Vijay Raaz as Master Pasha
- Yashpal Sharma as S.P. Tiwari
- Hiten Tejwani as Udit
- Sudhir Pandey as Minister
- Pankaj Jha
- Lalit Tiwari
- Rasika Dugal as Deepti
- Sanjay Mishra as Director in the Film
- Prithvi Zutshi as CM
- Sharat Sonu as Gardener

== Themes ==
The film, set in Lucknow, was inspired by the director's experience in New York two days after the 9/11 attacks when he was detained by the police and interrogated for five hours, who presumed him to be a Muslim, since he was unshaven and had long hair. The film is also inspired by the short story Falgun Ki Ek Upkatha written by Priyamvad.

== Production ==
The film was shot at locations in Kakori and Lucknow, including the latter's Bakshi Ka Talab, in April 2006.

== Soundtrack ==
Anwar

Soundtrack album by Mithoon, Pankaj Awasthi
- Released: 15 November 2006
- Recorded: 2006
- Genre: Feature film soundtrack
- Length: 60:01
- Label: Saregama
External audio
- Official Audio Jukebox on YouTube

The music, composed by Mithoon and Pankaj Awasthi, was released on the Saregama label. The launch event took place at Raheja Classique, Andheri on 15 November 2006, where politician Rajendra Singh Rana inaugurated the audio while Mahesh Bhatt released the audio CD. Also present at the launch were producer Rajesh Singh, director Manish Jha, actors Javed Jaffrey and Soni Razdan apart from the cast and crew.

In a 2025 interview, Mithoon revealed that the album was heavily inspired by the culture of Lucknow. He added that Maula Mere Maula was inspired by the city's rhythm and fabric, which became the song's heartbeat. Jha had briefed and told him about the essence of Lucknow’s tehzeeb (culture), and the eventually popular song still played in his concerts.

Track list
No.	Title	Lyrics	Music	Singer(s)	Length
1.	"Maula Mere Maula"	Sayeed Quadri	Mithoon	Roop Kumar Rathod, Sudesh Bhosle, Mithoon, Kshitij Tarey	6:04
2.	"Javeda Zindagi - Tose Naina Laage"	Hasan Kamal	Mithoon	Kshitij Tarey, Shilpa Rao	8:22
3.	"Bangla Khula"	Dharam Sarthi	Pankaj Awasthi	Megha Sriram	5:18
4.	"Dilbar Mera"	Shyam Ravindran	Pankaj Awasthi	Pankaj Awasthi	4:53
5.	"Jo Maine Aas Lagayi"	Pankaj Awasthi	Pankaj Awasthi	Pankaj Awasthi	2:05
6.	"Anwar's Dream - Symphony In Blue"		Pankaj Awasthi	Pankaj Awasthi	3:16
7.	"Anwar's Confession - Into The Black"	Pankaj Awasthi	Pankaj Awasthi	Pankaj Awasthi	3:17
8.	"Mela - Shadow of Sunlight"	Pankaj Awasthi	Pankaj Awasthi	Pankaj Awasthi	2:39
9.	"Bangla Khula" (Remix)	Dharam Sarthi	Pankaj Awasthi	Megha Sriram	5:18
10.	"Maula Mere Maula" (Uplifting Club Mix)	Sayeed Quadri	Mithoon	Roop Kumar Rathod, Kshitij Tarey, Mithoon	7:25
11.	"Maula Mere Maula" (Sunset Lounge Mix)	Sayeed Quadri	Mithoon	Roop Kumar Rathod, Kshitij Tarey, Mithoon	6:53
12.	"Maula Mere Maula" (DJ San's Electronic Lab Mix)	Sayeed Quadri	Mithoon	Roop Kumar Rathod, Kshitij Tarey, Mithoon	4:31
Total length:					60:01

== Release ==
The film was scheduled to initially release on 29 December 2006, but was later postponed to 12 January 2007 as the makers were not getting the right screens, the best of which were blocked already. It was also reported that the decision to postpone the release was made by producer Rajesh Singh at the last minute because one of the distributors of Manisha Koirala’s 2004 home production Paisa Vasool was standing against Anwar's release, claiming she did not pay up the losses caused by the failure of Paisa Vasool. Singh also attributed the postponement to the superstition that films released in late December and early January of any year — a "jinxed" period — fared poorly at the box office.

An exclusive screening of the film was held on the night of 4 January 2007 at Zee Preview Theatre in Andheri.

=== Home media ===
Shemaroo Entertainment released the film on DVD and VCD on 25 January 2007. It also released an English dubbed version on YouTube in 2019.

== Reception ==
=== Box office ===
The film had a limited theatrical release across India in 25 screens. Made on a ₹3 crore budget, the film was a box office flop, earning only ₹12 lakh worldwide. Nauheed Cyrusi felt the viewers did not grasp the film's concept, and its "terrible" distribution sabotaged its chances of a potential box office success.

=== Critical response ===
Vipin Vijayan from Rediff.com gave the film 2 stars out of 5, feeling the story had several loose ends and the item sequence was unneeded in an already rather slow-paced film whose saving graces were the music (except the item number) and the cinematography. Taran Adarsh from Bollywood Hungama gave the film 1 star out of 5, calling the screenplay "a total downer" for focusing on subplots that were not related to the main plot. However, he praised the music (except the item number he deemed vulgar), cinematography and performances.
