= Adampur Indwara =

- Village
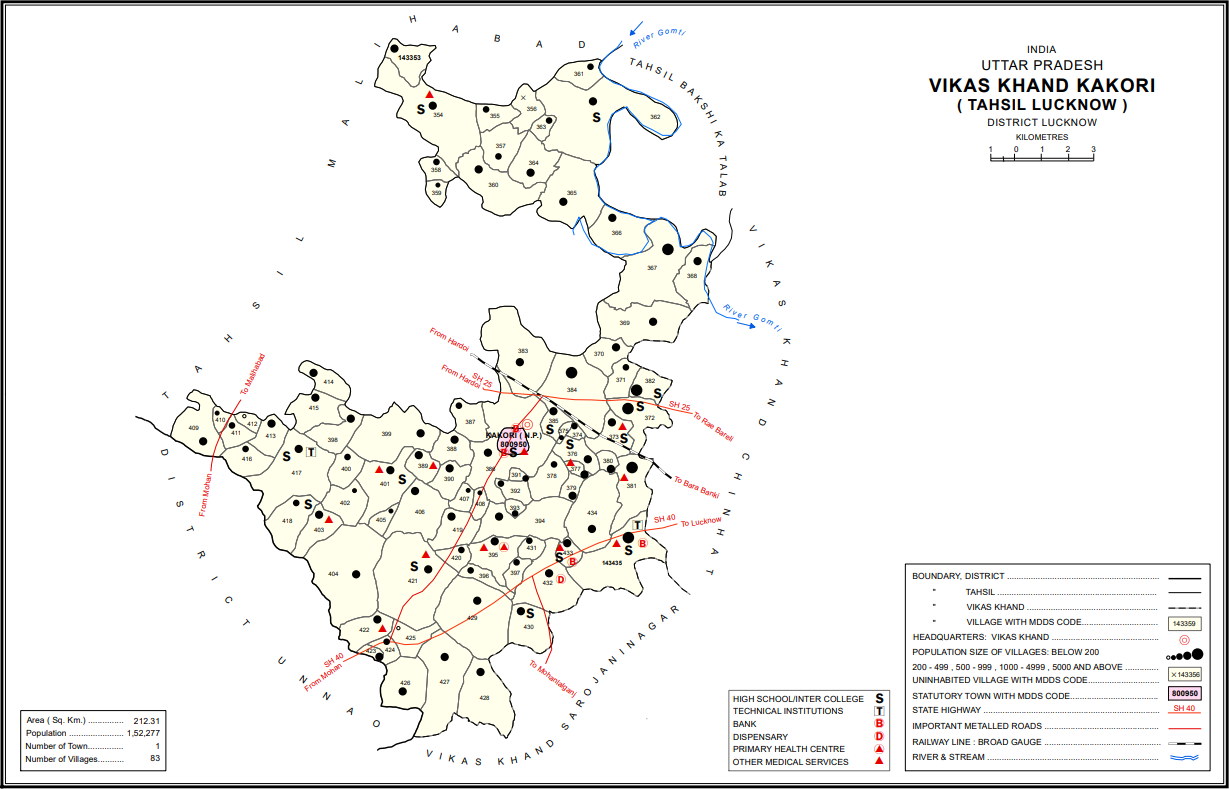
- Map showing Adampur Indwara (#402) in Kakori CD block

- Location in Uttar Pradesh, India Adampur Indwara (India)
- Coordinates: 26.84°N 80.72°E
- Country: India
- State: Uttar Pradesh
- District: Lucknow

Area
  - Total: 3.685 km^{2} (1.423 sq mi)

Population (2011)
  - Total: 484
  - Density: 131/km^{2} (340/sq mi)

Languages
  - Official: Hindi
- Time zone: UTC+5:30 (IST)
- PIN: 226101

Adampur Indwara is a village in Kakori block of Lucknow district, Uttar Pradesh, India. According to 2011 census of India the population of the village is 484 out whom of 252 are males and 232 are females.

The 1961 census recorded Adampur Indwara (here spelled "Adampur Andirwara") as comprising 1 hamlet, with a total population of 167 (89 male and 78 female), in 30 households and 28 physical houses. The area of the village was given as 441 acres.

The 1981 census recorded Adampur Indwara (here spelled "Adampur Indarwara") as having a population of 254 people, in 47 households, and covering an area of 170.38 hectares. It had no amenities other than drinking water.
