= Yagyadutt Sharma (novelist) =

Yagyadutt Sharma (Hindi: यज्ञदत्त शर्मा; 18 January 1916 – 1993) was a Hindi novelist, writer and poet.

Sharma Ji wrote more than 60 novels, 18 Samiksha Granth, 79 books on literature and two poetic works containing pre-historical, historical, social, national subjects. His writings are taken as a subject for researchers in many colleges and universities.

He received the Soviet Land Nehru Award for his work Shilanyas in 1967, by the then Prime Minister of India Mrs. Indira Gandhi

== Personal life and education ==
Born in a Brahmin family of Zamindars, in Faridnagar, Uttar Pradesh, he was a post graduate topper in Hindi literature from Allahabad University (1941). He had a love of writing; he shifted to Delhi in 1942 with his patriotic thoughts and non-political writings.

== Awards and honors ==
- He was honoured as Chief Literary Advisor of Bharat Sevak Samaj, in 1952 by Chief patron of BSS and prime minister Jawaharlal Nehru
- Awarded Soviet Land Nehru Award for Shilanyas
- UNESCO Award for "Hamari Duniya" non-literary book on children science in 1971.
- Prakashveer Shastri award for Samrat Ashok
- Sahitya Varidhi Award by Uttar Pradesh Government for his contribution in Hindi Literature
- Shilanyas, Taj Mahal, Samrat Ashok, Acharya Chanakya, Dabdaba, Bharat Sevak, Parivaar, Insaan, Nirman Path, Muktipath, Swapna Khil Utha, Chautha Raasta are some of his other award winning works.

== See also ==
- List of Hindi language authors
