= Chandrakiran Sonrexa =

Indian author (1920–2009)

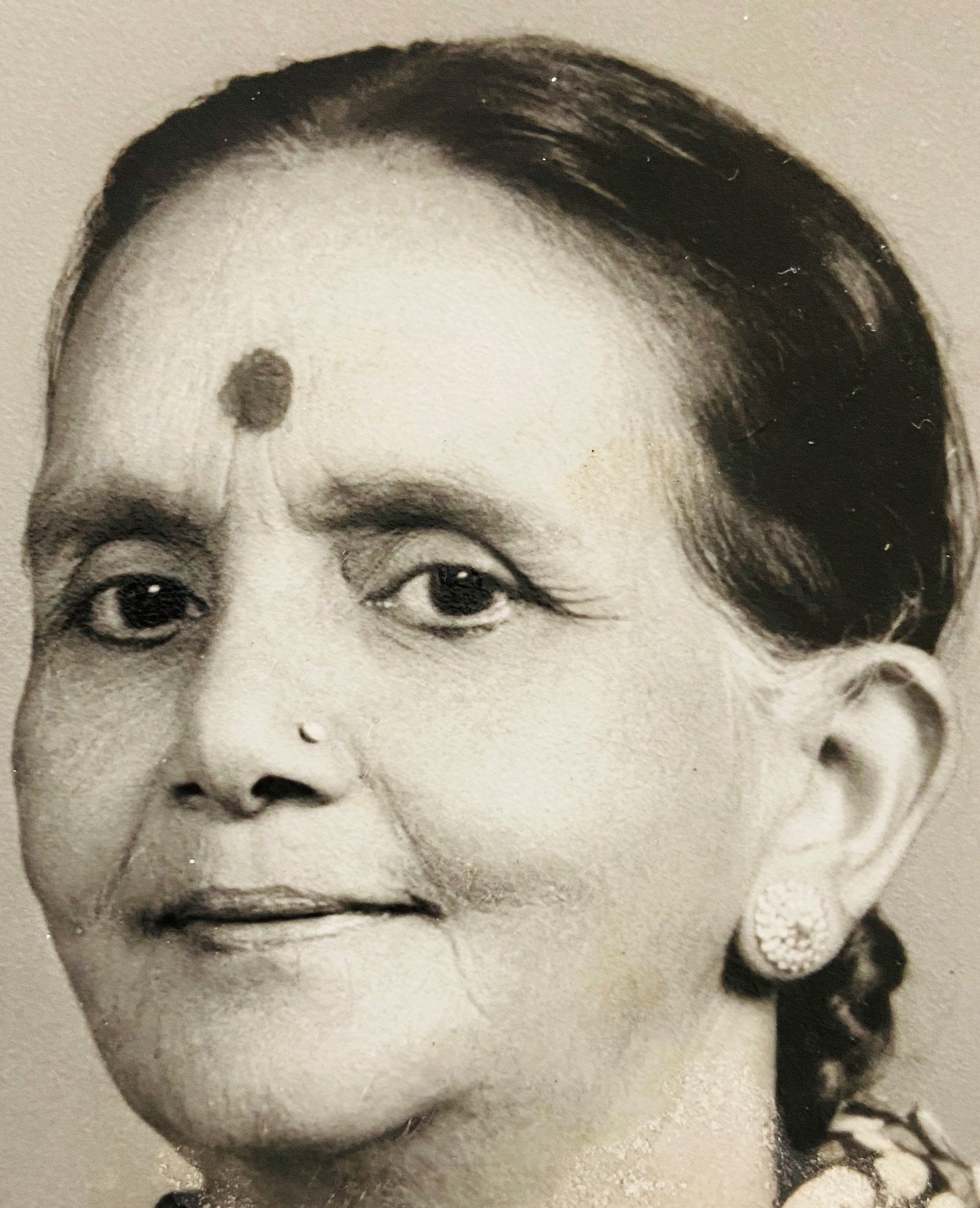
- Born: Kumari Chandrakiran; 19 October 1920; Nowshera, Peshawar, British India
- Died: 18 May 2009 (aged 88); New Delhi, India
- Education: Passed lower middle in 1933 from Mission Middle School, Meerut (Sadar), later studied at home and passed prabhakar, Visharad and Sahitya Ratna in Hindi. The last equivalent to BA, in Hindi
- Occupations: Script writer, editor
- Spouse(s): Shri Kanti Chandra Sonrexa, a writer journalist, photographer who later joined provincial civil service in U.P Cadre
- Writing career
- Pen name: Chhaya, Jyotsna
- Language: Hindi, Urdu, Bengali, Punjabi, Gujarati and English
- Years active: 1956–1978
- Notable works: Pinjare Ke Maina (Autobiography), Adamkhor, Den' Rozhdennii︠a︡
- Notable awards: 1946: Seksaria Award on "Adamkhor" by Akhil Bhartiya Sahitya Sammelan; 1987: Saraswat Samman from Madhya Pradesh Sahitya Academy.; 1988: Subhdra Kumari Chauhan Gold Medal by UP Sahitya Sammelan.; 2001: Rs 1 lakh Hindi Sahitya Academy (Delhi) award for being the best Hindi woman writer of the century

Chandrakiran Sonrexa (also written as Candrakiraṇa Saunareksā; 19 October 1920 – 18 May 2009) was a writer of Hindi literature. Her writings in Hindi, spanning a period of 75 years have been published and translated in several languages including Russian, Hungarian, Czech, Slovak and English and also several Indian languages. She worked as a Script writer and Editor at All India Radio, Lucknow for over two decades (1957–1979). In 2001 she was awarded the title of Best Woman Hindi Short Story Writer of the 20th century by Hindi Academy (Delhi) and was presented the award by Sheila Dikshit, the then Chief Minister of Delhi.

== Biography ==
=== Early life ===
Chandrakiran's father was a storekeeper in the military which was a transferable job. He was posted at Naushera in Peshawar (now in Pakistan) in 1920 where Chandrakiran, his last child, was born. The date or “Tithi” according to the Hindu calendar was Saptami of Durga Navratri in the month of 'Aashwin' (October). By the time she was one and a half year old her father was transferred to Meerut in U.P. (United Provinces then and Uttar Pradesh now). At first the family rented a house in Rajban Bazar. But in 1923 shifted to Sadar Kabaadi Bazar which was a timber market. Their house was near Bholanath Temple.

=== Education ===
Chandrakiran's first school was Sadar Kanya Pathshala where she was admitted in class one in July 1926. She studied up to class 4th in this school and received a double promotion twice. Thus she cleared four classes in two years. For class 5th she joined Sadar mission school, which was run by Christian missionaries.

She was a bright student and was good at Mathematics, Hindi, and Geography. The only subject she could not cope with was drawing. A favorite of all the teachers, Chandrakiran often had to face jealousy and bullying from her older classmates.

=== Influence of the Indian freedom movement ===
In the year 1931, when Mahatma Gandhi's non-cooperation movement was spreading all over the country she too started to wear Khadi (hand-spun cotton cloth). At the age of eleven she longed to participate in the sit-ins to protest at shops selling foreign liquor or clothes, and wanted to join the congress party. She was ready to court arrest even; of course she was not allowed to do any of these by her loving father, who doted on her.

=== Exposure to literature ===
A voracious reader, Chandrakiran devoured any printed matter she could lay her hands on - Hindi/Urdu stories, novels, poems, magazines - besides her text books. She finished 'Ramcharit Manas', Kabir's 'Sakhi-Sabad Ramaini' and 'Sukh-Sagar' even though she could not fully understand them. She read 'Uncle Tom's Cabin' in translation in a serialized form in an Urdu magazine. She finished entire works of renowned Hindi writers like Premchand, Kaushik and Sudarshan. Magazines like 'Madhuri, Saraswati Chand' etc., were borrowed from the neighbors. Even books which her elder sister prohibited her from reading – 'Devdas' of Sharat Chandra Chattopadhyay or 'Hatimtaai' - were read on the sly. Because of the speed with which she finished reading entire volumes, and was a chatter box as well, her brother Kanhaiya Lal called her 'Peshawar Mail'.

=== First published work ===
She wrote her first story titled 'Achhoot' (the untouchable) about the tough life of a village boy of low-caste (who later became an officer, having been educated and converted to Christianity by a priest), at the age of 11 only. It was sent for publication in the magazine 'Vijay' from Calcutta with a note to the editor to print it if found worthy otherwise to be thrown in the trash bin, but not to be sent back. It was signed by her without any address of the writer. But perhaps the editor found the city's name from the stamp of the envelope, hence it carried her name as 'Kumari Chandrakiran', Meerut. Her family and neighbors guessed that it was she, since her name was a rare one. She had expected a reprimand but received praise instead. And her writing career started.

=== Parents' demise ===
She was admitted in Class 8th in Raghunath Girl's High School by her father, despite her eldest brother's opposition. But fate willed otherwise. Her mother, who was a diabetic, fell seriously ill. Since there was no other female in the house to carry the household chores or look offer her mother, her studies came to an abrupt end. On October 10, 1933, when Chandrakiran was 9 days short of her 13th birthday, her mother left this world. Post her demise, she confined herself to the four walls of her home, pursuing whatever studies she could, while running the household. In April 1936 she lost her father too.

== Novels ==
Year	Title	Description	Length (Pages)	Publisher	ISBN	Cover Image
1962, 2008	Chandan Chandni		275	Mitra Prakashan, Samanantar Prakashan	81-86306-49-8	
1972, 2008	Vanchita		120	Lokchetna Prakashan, Samantar Prakashan		
2003, 2008	Kahin Se Kahin Nahin		216	Muhim Prakashan, Adiba Books	81-8164-001-2	
2003	Aur Diya Jalta Raha		127	Muhim Prakashan	81-8164-004-7	

== Collection of short stories ==
Year	Title	Description	Length (Pages)	Publisher	ISBN	Cover Image
1946	AadamKhor		184	Saraswati Press		
1962	Birthday	Translated in Russian as "Den' Rozhdenniia"	76	Moskva Izd	67056666 (LCCN)	
1990	Jawan Mitti		264	Prathibha Pratishthan		
2002	Jaggo Tai			National Book Trust	978-81-237-4120-8	
2007	A Class Ka Qaidi		183	Literacy House	81-88435-27-9	
2007	Doosra Bachcha		174	Itihas Shodh Sansthan	81-8073-064-5	
2007	Saudamini		176	Sharda Prakashan	81-85023-39-5	
2007	Vey Bhediye		181	Parag Prakashan	81-7468-045-4 9788180990625	
2007	Hirni		174	Sharda Prakashan	81-8070-052-6	
2008	Meri Priaya Kahaniyaan		350	Purvodaya Prakshan	81-7037-086-8	
2011	Ferfiassag	Collection of 15 stories in Hungarian				
2011	Nasamajh			DJ Publications	978-93-80786-14-8	
2011	Aadha Kamra			Eastend Publications	978-93-80807-09-6	
2011	Khuda Ki Den				93-80784-12-0	
2011	Udhar Ka Sukh			Nalanda Prakshan	81-8073-069-7	

== Children drama/stories (2008) ==
Year	Title	Description	Length (Pages)	Publisher	ISBN	Cover Image
	Pashu Pakshi Sammelan	Drama Collection				
2008	Jinhone Itihaas Racha	Bharat Ke Veero ki Kahaniyan		Akshay Prakshan	81-8077-023-0	
2008	Shishe Ke Mahal	Novel		Antara Prakashan	81-8079-036-3	
2007	Bhondu Aur Golu	Story		National Book Trust	978-81-237-5112-2	
2008	Damyanti	Novel		Akshay Prakshan	81-8077-021-4	

=== Other ===
Year	Title	Description	Length (Pages)	Publisher	ISBN	Cover Image
2008	Peedhiyon Ke Pul	Collection of Street Plays	128	Antara Prakashan	81-8079-035-5	
2008	Pinjrey Ki Maina	Autobiography	416	Purvodaya Prakashan	81-7037-085-X	

== International publications ==
- In 1962, sponsored by Academician E.P. Chelishave, a collection of best stories was published in Russian language as "Den' Rozhdenniia" the title story being "Birthday".
- Story on Family Planning "Grihasthi Ka Sukh" written in the fifties was selected among 10 best stories of Asia and Africa by the government of Czechoslovakia and published in collection named "Rodini Stati". It was translated by Professor Odolen Smekel (Later Czech Ambassador to India).
- Collection of 19 Hindi stories has been translated into English at the University of Oxford under the guidance of head of the department at the Faculty of Oriental Studies (Dr Imre Bangha).
- Stories have been in the prescribed text at the University of London, University of Oxford in the UK and University of California at Berkeley.

== Publications in Indian magazines and Indian languages ==
Her poems have been published in Kadambini, Naya Gyanodaya etc.

A very large number of stories have been translated in several Indian languages like Bengali magazines Basumati, Prabasi, and Mahila Mangal, Punjabi magazines Preetalahiri, Tamil magazine Kalki, Urdu magazines Saqi and Ajkal.

== Research projects ==
Doctorates awarded for research projects on her works.

Year	Researcher	Publisher	Title
1992	Dr. Kuntal Kumari	Aman Prakshan	Srimati Chandrakiran Sonrexa Evam Sharatchandra ke Nari Patra
2014	Santosh Subhashrao Kulkarni		Chandrakiran Sonrexsa ke kathasahitya me vyakta stri jivan ke vividh roop

== Film made for TV ==
Gumrah, a Telefilm on Doordarshan on the topic of terrorism in Punjab

== Honors and awards ==
Year	Award	Description	Awarded By
1946	Seksaria Award	Awarded for collection of short stories titled "Adamkhor"	Akhil Bhartiya Sahitya Sammelan
1987	Saraswat Samman		Madhya Pradesh Sahitya Academy
1988	Subhdra Kumari Chauhan Gold Medal		UP Sahitya Sammelan
2001	Best Hindi woman writer of the century		Hindi Sahitya Academy (Delhi)
