= Bihari Lal =

Indian poet (1595-1663)

Bihari Lal Chaube
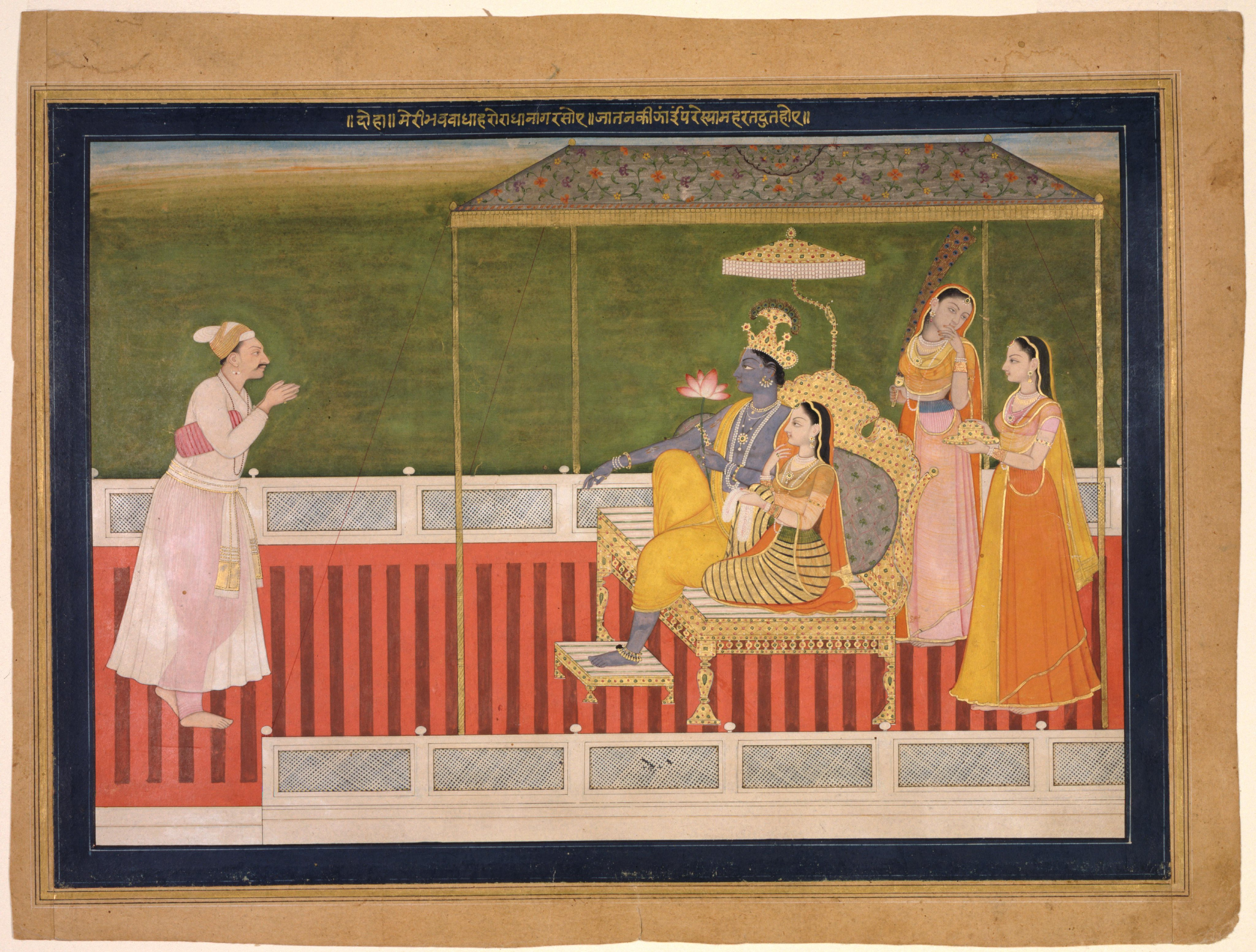
- 'The Poet Bihari Offers Homage to Radha and Krishna', attributed to Nainsukh, ca.1760–65
- Born: 1595; Gwalior, Mughal Empire
- Died: 1663 (aged 67–68); Vrindavan, Mughal Empire
- Occupation: Poet
- Writing career
- Period: Riti Kaal
- Literary movement: Ritikaal

Bihari Lal Chaube or Bihārī (1595–1663) was a Hindi poet, who is famous for writing the Satasaī (Seven Hundred Verses) in Brajbhasha, a collection of approximately seven hundred distichs, which is perhaps the most celebrated Hindi work of poetic art, as distinguished from narrative and simpler styles. Today it is considered the most well known book of the Ritikavya Kaal or 'Riti Kaal'(an era in which poets wrote poems for kings) of Hindi literature.

The language is the form of Hindi called Brajbhasha, spoken in the country about Mathura, where the poet lived. The couplets are inspired by the Krishna side of Vishnu-worship, and the majority of them take the shape of amorous utterances of Radha, the chief of the Gopis or cowherd maidens of Braj, and her divine lover, the son of Vasudeva. Each couplet is independent and complete in itself. The distichs, in their collected form, are arranged, not in any sequence of narrative or dialogue, but according to the technical classification of the sentiments which they convey as set forth in the treatises on Indian rhetoric.

== Biography ==
=== Early life and education ===
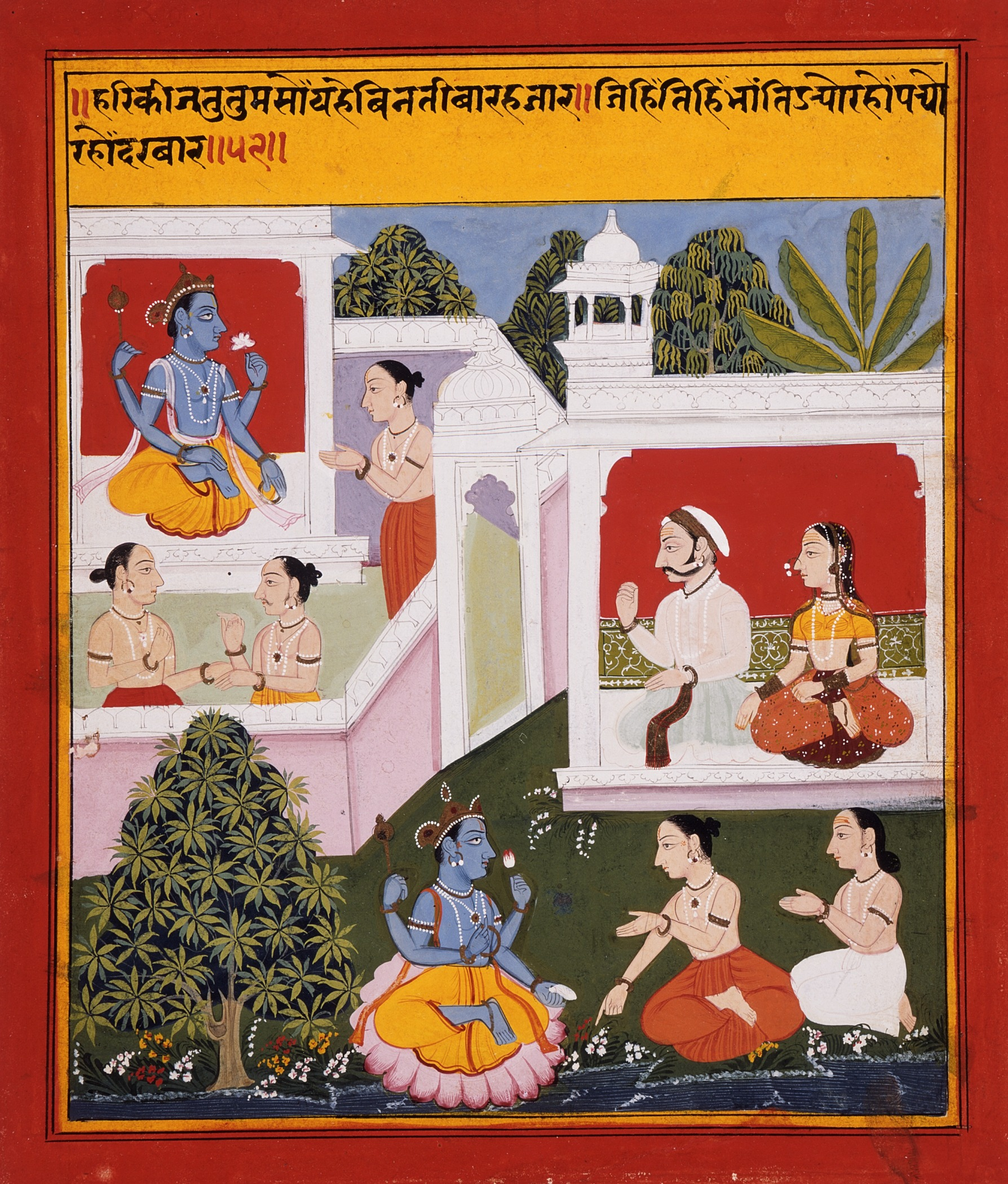
The Poet Bihārī Offers Homage to Radha and Krishna

Bihari was born in Gwalior in 1595, and spent his boyhood in Orchha in the Bundelkhand region, where his father, Keshav Rai lived. After marriage he settled with in-law's in Mathura. His father was Keshav Rai.

Early in his life, he studied ancient Sanskrit texts. In Orchha state, he met the famous poet keshavdas from whom he took lessons in poetry. Later, when he had shifted to Mathura, he got an opportunity to present his in court of visiting Mughal Emperor Shah Jahan, who immediately got impressed by his work and invited him to stay in Agra.

Once at Agra, he learnt Persian language and came into contact with Rahim, another famous poet. It was also at Agra that Raja Jai Singh I (ruled. 1611–1667), of Amber, near Jaipur, happened to hear him, and invited him over to Jaipur, and it was here that he composed his greatest work, Satasai. After the death of his wife Bihari followed the path of Bhakti & Vairagya. He left the court & went to Vrindavan, where he died in the year 1663.

== Significance of Bihari's work ==
One of the famous Dohas (couplet) written by Bihārī is:

Satsaiya ke dohre jyun navak ke teer
Dekhan men chote lage ghaav kare gambhir.

Translation:

The couplets of (Bihari's) Satsai are like the arrows of a hunter,
they look small but cut deep.

Though Bihari 'Satasai' is only known work of Bihari, an estimation in which the work is held may be measured by the number of commentators who have devoted themselves to its elucidation, of whom Dr G. A. Grierson mentions seventeen. The collection has also twice been translated into Sanskrit.

The best-known commentary is that of Lallu Lal, entitled the Lala-chandrika. The author was employed by Dr. John Gilchrist in the College of Fort William, where he finished his commentary in 1818. A critical edition of it has been published by Dr G. A. Grierson (Calcutta, Government of India Press, 1896).

== Bibliography ==
- The Satasaī (English Translation), Penguin Books, 1992. ISBN 0-14-044576-5.
- Bihari Satsai. (Hindi and English Translation) Dr. Shyamsunder Dube, Publications Division.
- The Veiled moon; English translations of Bihari satsai, Amar Nath Jha; Girijā Kumāra Māthura. New Delhi, Indian Council for Cultural Relations, 1973.
