= Priyamvad =

Indian writer

Priyamvad (born 22 December 1952) is an Indian writer in Hindi literature. He has written novels, short stories, and essays, and is also the editor of the Hindi journal Akaar.

== Career ==
Priyamvad started writing as a student. His first book was Lal Kaner Ke Phool, a book of poetry. In 1980 he came third in a national story-writing competition from the Delhi-based magazine Sarika, for his story "Boshidani".

Priyamvad won the national Vanmali Katha Puraskar in 2019. Some researchers have analysed parts of his work.

== Selected writings ==
Novels

- Ve Vahan Qaid Hain (They are in prison there)
- Ek Lekhak Ki Anatomy (anatomy of a writer)
- Bhaaartiya Rajniti Ke Do Aakhyan (Two narratives of Indian politics)
- Guftgoo (conversation)
- Parchhaain Naach (Dance of shadow)
- Us Raat Ki Varsha Mein (In the rain of that night)
- Naach Ghar (Dancing home)
- Mitti Ki Gaadi (mud truck)
- Bharatiya Loktanktra Ka Koras: Kuch Bisari Bikhari Dhwaniyan (about Indian democracy)

Stories

He has written around 50 stories, including:

- Ek Apavitra Ped (An unholy tree)
- Khargos (The Rabbit): A film of the same name based on this story was released in 2009.
- Falgun Ki Ek Upkatha (A tale of Phalguna): The 2007 film Anwar is based on this story.
- Palang: a story about old age in society, translated into English as The Bed by Nivedita Menon.
