= Satasai =

Work by 17th century Hindi poet Bihari

The Satasai (Satsai) or Bihari Satsai (Seven Hundred Verses of Bihari) is a famous work of the early 17th century by the Hindi poet Bihārī, in the Braj Bhasha dialect of Hindi spoken in the Braj region of northern India. It contains Dohas, or couplets, on Bhakti (devotion), Neeti (Moral policies) and Shringara (love).

An important work in the Ritikavya Kaal or Ritikaal of Hindi literature, the Satsai is today celebrated in paintings in various Indian miniature styles, particularly in the Kangra style, as is the case with Jayadeva's Gita Govinda.

== Origin ==
The Poet Bihārī Offers Homage to Radha and Krishna

The story of the origin of the 'Bihari Satsai' is rather intriguing. When Raja Jai Singh I (ruled. 1611–1667), of Amber, near Jaipur, heard Bihari at the court of the Mughal Emperor Shahjahan, he invited Bihari to Amber.

Later Raja Jai Singh married a young wife and, lost in her love, didn't step out of his harem for over a year, also neglecting his state duties and his other wives. That was when his ministers and his senior wife coaxed Bihari to send the following couplet to him hidden amidst the flower petals meant for the Maharaja's bed:

"Nahin paraga nahin madhur madhu nahin vikasa yahi kal ali kali hi saun bandhyau again kaun haval."

"There is no pollen; there is no sweet honey; nor yet has the blossom opened. If the bee is enamoured of the bud, who can tell what will happen when she is a full-blown flower."

Reading these lines in the morning, the Raja was immediately brought back to his senses. Later he asked Bihari to write a couplet for him every day, and in turn he would reward the poet with a gold coin each time. Seven hundred verses later, the Raja asked that his verses be compiled in book form; hence the collection of the 'Bihari Satsai' was born out of a poet's need to impress his patron and a state's need to have its king back from the quagmire of sensual pleasure.

== The Text ==
Although the Satsai is available in many recensions, the Ratnakara edition of 1924, containing 713 couplets, is most widely accepted

The literary background of the Satsai contains many Indian literary and poetic traditions, including a tradition of self-contained single-verse poems, a tradition of rhythmic stanzas originally inserted into larger works and later collected in anthologies, and a tradition of poetics borrowed from Sanskrit Literature. The latter tradition is most important, for, as India's "poet's poet" and foremost representative of the Riti Period of Hindi Literature, Bihari made extensive use of the traditional rhetorical figures of sense and sound called Alamkaras to embellish his couplets and provide them with much hidden meaning.

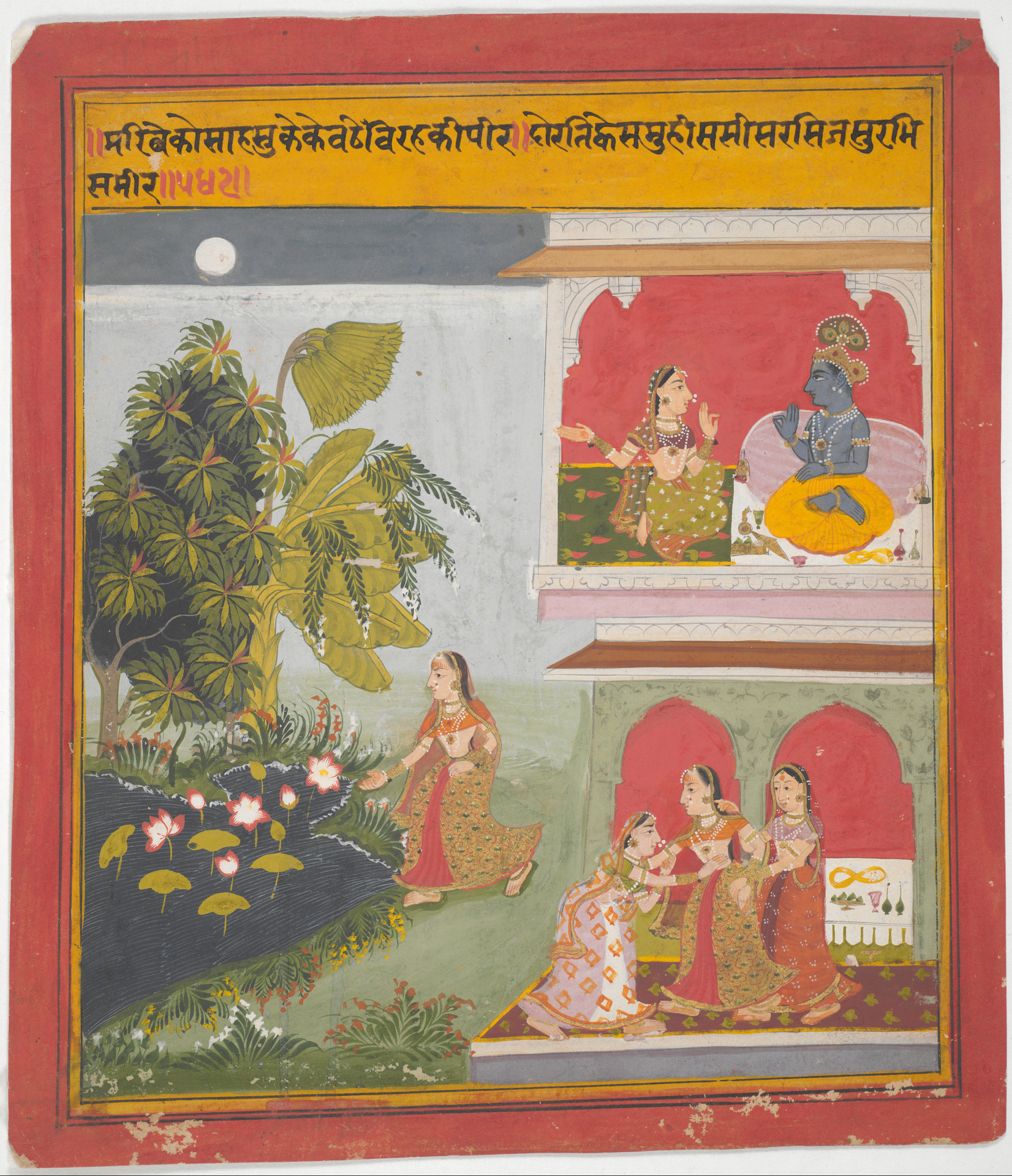
Illustration from a manuscript of the Satasai of Bihari, Yale University Art Gallery

As for subject matter and imagery, the Satsai borrows from the Sanskrit Kavya tradition, the Prakrit anthologies and other sources, but in its emphasis on the love of Radha and Krishna, it has affinities with Bengali Vaishnava poetry.

The majority of the couplets deal with love, presenting a visual portrayal of a heroine or hero (nayika or nayak) in separation from or in union with a lover. Of 713 couplets, 315 include at least one word and often several words related to the visual sense, such as "eyes," "glances," "saw," or "looking". In the rare descriptions of physical love or encounter, an overall visual image of the eyes themselves dominates:

320. As if drawing me with her glance, she looked, lazily went inside, / And the deer-eyed one's eyes made a desire to peer again arise.

464. Seeing the husband's hand-army rush to raze the cover, / Shyness stayed hidden in the fortress of eyes within the forest of lashes.

Related to the visual theme is an imagery of light and fire, particularly of the "fires of separation":

553. Flaming from parting's fire, flowing with the fluid of the eyes, / On a sigh's wind, twenty-four hours a day, her heart flies.

Thus, although in one sense a devotional work, the couplets are meant to be judged mainly as expressions of poetic virtuosity and secondarily as expressions of devotion and love. Many of the couplets exhibit an aggressive tone different from the reverential attitude of the earlier Bhakti or devotional works:

71. How long I've humbly called you, Syam, but you give no relief; / The world-wind has caught you, too, O world-guru, world-chief!

The didactic couplets express values one might expect of a poet in an era of patronage. In the following couplet, Bihari is concerned that each person should seek his own proper environment:

276. The very name urbane is scorned and mocked by all; / Gone to the vulgar village, all pride and merit fall.

The historical period of Bihari (1595–1664) was a time of increased contact between the Hindu and Muslim, or the Rajput and Turko-Persian, traditions, and Bihari was supported by one of the foremost Hindu nobles of the Mughal court. As a result, the prestige of Persian Literature influenced the Hindu poet in his selection of non-Persian literary traditions, and there was a simultaneous interest of both Hindi and Urdu poets in similar aspects of their respective traditions—particular themes and imagery, the couplet form, poetic figures and alliteration. Although outwardly a Hindu work, the Satsai embodies much that is Mughal in spirit. .
