= Kakori =

- Town
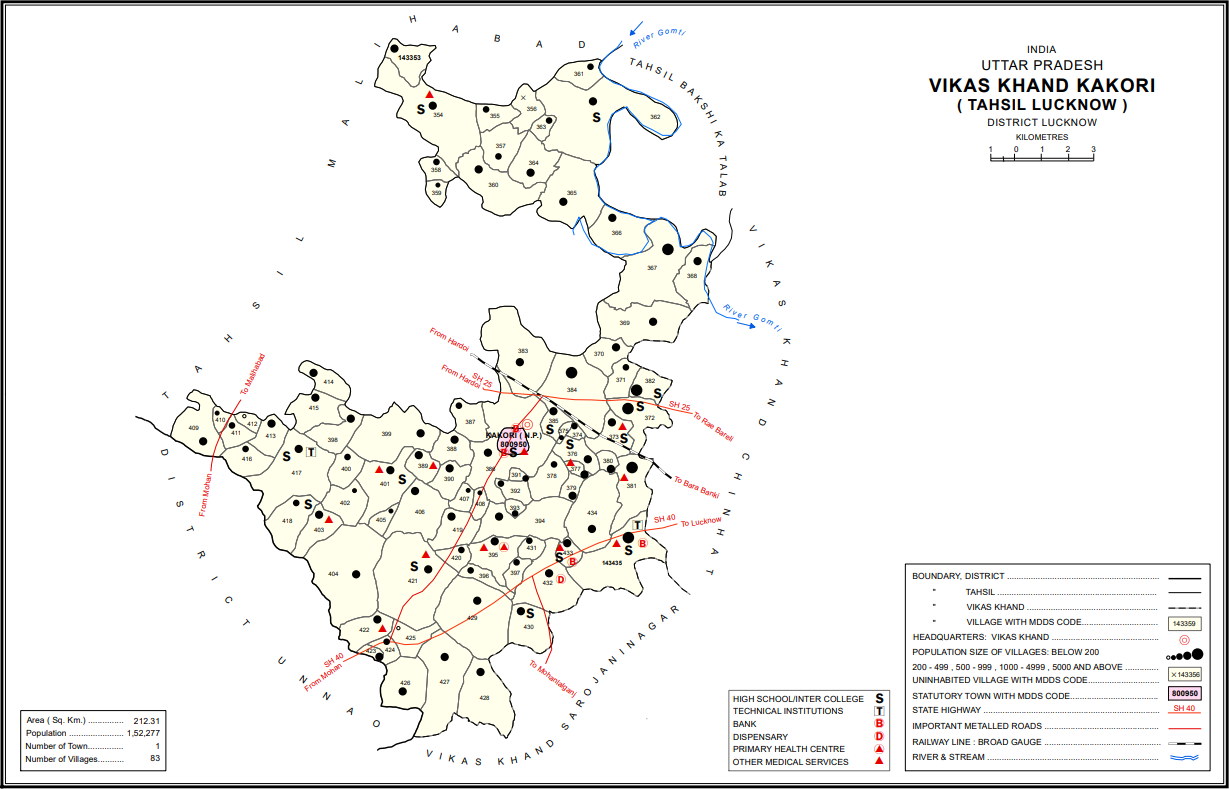
- Map of Kakori CD block

- Location in Uttar Pradesh, India
- Coordinates: 26.88°N 80.8°E
- Country: India
- State: Uttar Pradesh
- District: Lucknow
- Elevation: 121 m (397 ft)

Population (2011)
  - Total: 19,403

Languages
  - Official: Hindi, Urdu
- Time zone: UTC+5:30 (IST)
- Vehicle registration: UP-32

Kakori is a town and a nagar panchayat in Lucknow district in the Indian state of Uttar Pradesh, 19 km North of Lucknow city centre. Kakori was a centre for Urdu poetry, literature and the Qadiriya Qalandari Sufi order. On 9 August 1925, Indian revolutionaries robbed a train of government funds in Kakori, an incident known as the Kakori conspiracy.

== History ==
In the last days of the 11th century, Kakori was ruled by Raja Kansa of Kasmandi (Kansamdap) near Malihabad, who was a Rajpasi by caste. At that time there was a colony of Bhars here.

When Syed Salar Masood Ghazi came to Kakori from Delhi, Raja Kansa fought with him. Kansa was defeated in this battle and this town came into the hands of the Muslims.

However, when the dominance of the Muslims decreased, once again the Bhars started living here. Till the 12th century, this place was under the empire of Bharon.

In 1202, Qutb ud-Din Aibak sent Muhammad Bakhtyar Khilji as Hakim Sardar Lashkar. When he passed through Lakhanpur to take up the governorship of the east, he established Bakhtiyar Nagar near Kakori and left some of his Pathani companions there.

These people started calling Lakhanpur, Lucknow. Sultan Shamsuddin Altamash sent Malik Nasiruddin here to suppress the increasing power of the Bhars, who defeated the Bhars in the war and established the rule of Delhi here.

Then till the last time of Muhammad bin Tughluq, Delhi's suzerainty remained on it. In the 13th century, King Kakor of Bharon built the fort of Kakori around which people started living.

== Kakori conspiracy ==
The town has a memorial to several revolutionaries involved in the Indian independence movement who looted a train near Kakori in August 1925 in what is known as the Kakori conspiracy. The village is still served by Kakori railway station.

== Geography ==
Kakori is located at 26.88°N 80.8°E. It has an average elevation of 121 metres (396 feet).

== Demographics ==
As of 2001 India census, Kakori had a population of 16,731. Males constitute 53% of the population and females 47%. Kakori has an average literacy rate of 46%, lower than the national average of 59.5%: male literacy is 51%, and female literacy is 40%. In Kakori, 13% of the population is under 6 years of age.

Religions in Kakori
Religion	Percent
Hindus	50.82%
Muslims	48.69%
Christians	0.26%
Others	0.23%

== Popular culture ==
Kakori has been used as a setting for various movies, of which Junoon (1978) and Umrao Jaan (1981) are two examples. Anwar (2007) also featured the town.

== Villages ==
Kakori block contains the following 83 villages:

Village name	Total land area (hectares)	Population (in 2011)
Man Mauna	186.6	1,043
Thavar	673.8	4,240
Padra Thavar	86.4	665
Autrouli	149.5	0
Kusmari	179.1	959
Jagtapur	53.8	659
Allupur	86.4	492
Sirsa Mau	415.4	2,317
Raniya Mau	131.9	839
Godramau	973.5	2,992
Bighapur	64.1	790
Sarsanda	277.5	1,523
Banshigarhi	443.2	1,499
Kakrabad	347.1	2,442
Jehta	674.1	5,774
Saitha	296.1	2 505
Maura	440.3	2,806
Saraipremraj	151.6	2,012
Lalnagar	97.9	971
Sikrauri	322.5	6,038
Dashaari	131	1,422
Muhinuddin Pur	55.5	798
Chakdadanpur	23.2	333
Saidpur Gaheri	159.6	2,089
Paliya	60.3	1,168
Bithona	91.5	796
Muzaffar Pur	110.6	1,196
Raipur	60.5	898
Salempur	420.9	5,992
Mahipatmau	150.1	5,722
Kushmora Dhaluapur	578.5	3,000
Amethia Salempur	515	6,618
Pahia Ajampur	101.8	1,844
Kakori	988.3	2,459
Birahu	143.6	977
Dashdoi	231.6	2,270
Gohra Mau	129.5	1,481
Karjhan	144.3	1,220
Chiloki	25.8	638
Mubarakpur	69.6	598
Chakperva	44.5	577
Karimabad	246.5	1,421
Baragaon	466.9	3,084
Mahtava	78.9	834
Gvalpur	63.5	531
Shahpur	243.2	1,969
Bhatau Jamalpur	477.4	1,784
Kusmi	136.4	858
Bhaliya	337.2	2,550
Adampur Indwara	368.5	484
Gahalwara	332.1	1,020
Dona	689	4,180
Naktora	75	414
Jaliyamau	336.9	2,398
Ajmatnagar	73.8	352
Mahmudpur	30.8	214
Goshalalpur	300.1	2,000
Dariyapyr	49.1	463
Saiphalpur	102.6	933
Soodi	62.7	118
Sherpurmau	145.1	1,286
Sarai Alipur	191.2	1,070
Basrela	192.9	1,535
Khanpur Mau	145	764
Behru	594.1	3,991
Revari	227.7	908
Kathigera	196.2	1,590
Belwa	115.3	772
Sakra	731.3	2,858
Tej Krishna Khera	387.5	1,392
Ibrahim Ganj	39.7	1,110
Madarpur	94.3	762
Saraimuhib	97.5	41
Puraina	132.8	1,447
Kuda Eat Gaon	428.3	2,811
Barkatabad Jahangirabad	489.9	1,939
Shivari	508.5	2,710
Hardoiyalal Nagar	276.6	1,870
Tendava	68.4	826
Khushal Ganj	382	4,337
Fatehganj	46.3	1,810
Narona	311.4	2,594
Sarosa Bharosa	671.9	5,585

The villages in Kakori block have a total population of 152,277, in 26,735 households.

== Notable people ==
- Mohsin Kakorvi (1805–1905), Indian Urdu poet, a well known writer of Naʽat during his time

== See also ==
- Dashdoi
