= Hari Joshi =

Indian writer and satirist

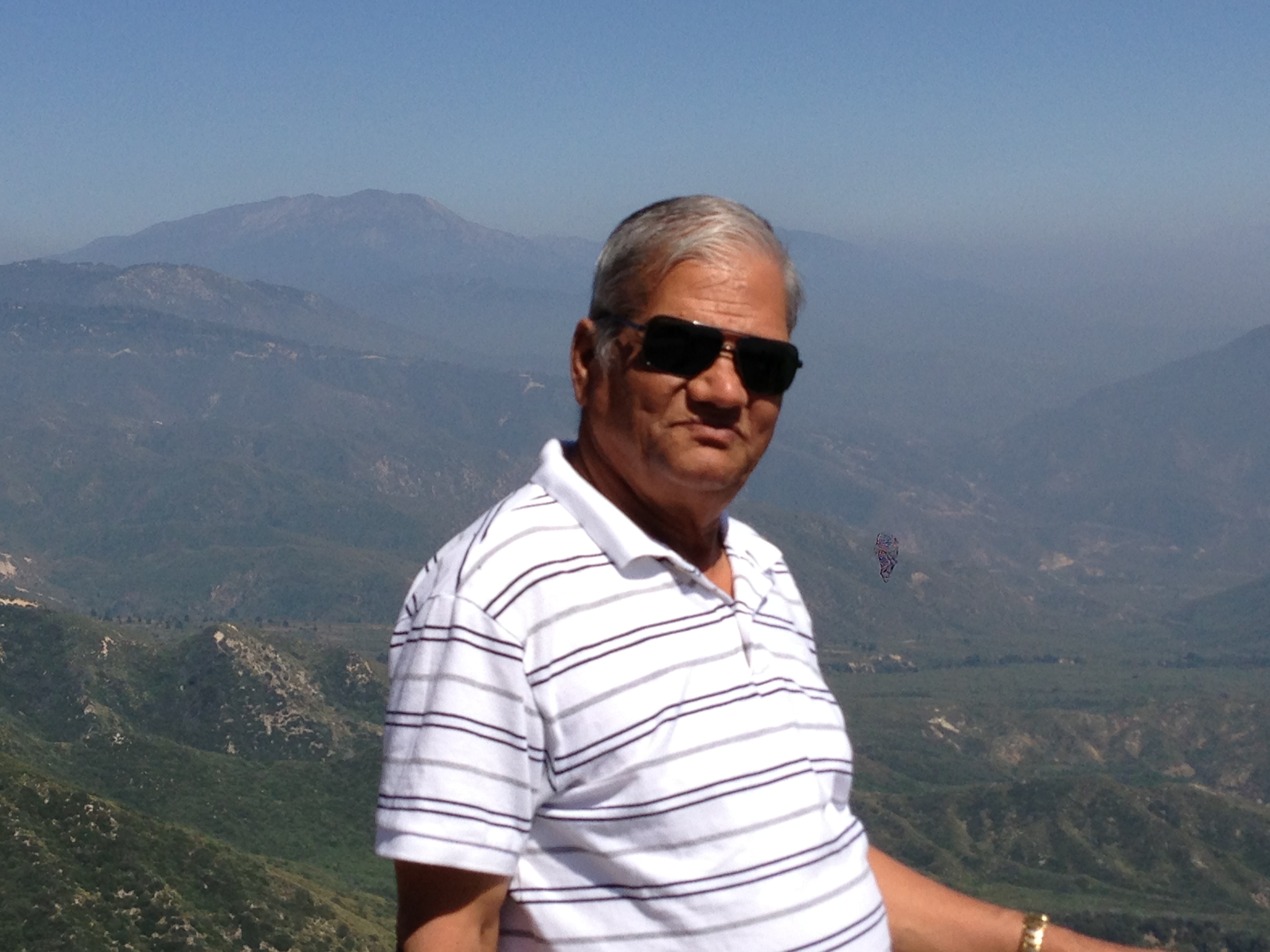
- Born: 17 November 1943 (age 82)
- Occupation: Writer; novelist; poet; satirist

Hari Joshi (born 17 November 1943) is an Indian Hindi language writer, satirist, novelist and poet. In 2013, he received the prestigious "Vyangya Shree Samman". He is also a recipient of "Vageeshwari Samman" for his book "Vyangya ke Rang" in 1995 and recipient of "Madhya Pradesh Lekhak Sangh Samman" in 2002 and "Sahitya Maneeshi Samman" in 2013.

== Early life ==
Born in a remote village, Khudia, Hari Joshi grew up with ten siblings in a place lacking basic amenities such as post office, police station, medical clinic etc. In 1949, Hari Joshi moved to Harda to pursue primary education. After completing fifth grade in 1954, he moved to Bhopal for further education and later pursued a career in engineering. He completed his PhD in Refrigeration from Maulana Azad National Institute of Technology (MANIT). He retired as a Professor of Mechanical Engineering from Government Engineering College Ujjain (M.P.) in 2004. He has lived in Bhopal since then

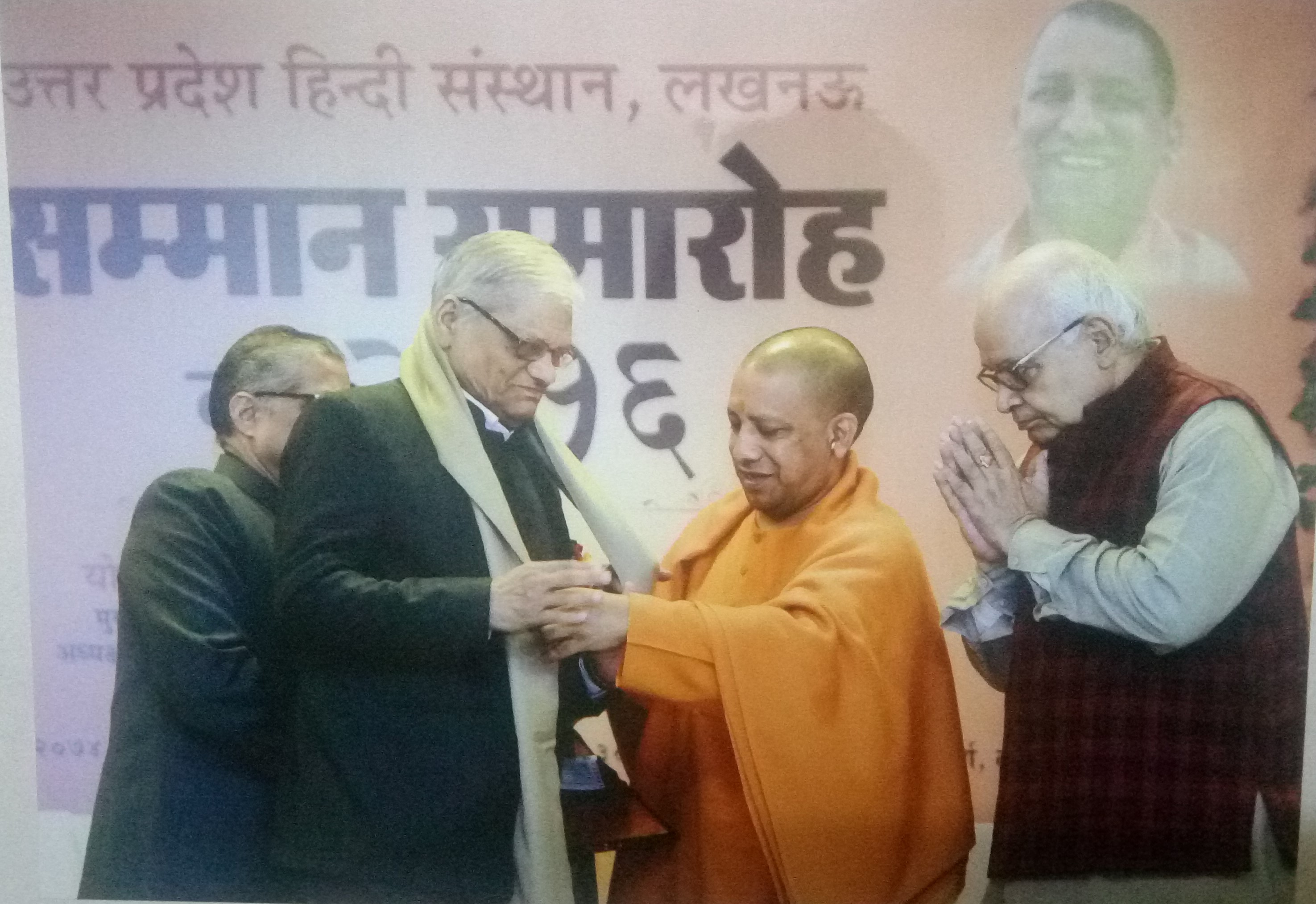

== Literary works ==
In 1954, he wrote his first poem in Hindi. In 1958, his article "Phool aur Shool" was published in inter-college magazine at Bhopal. His works were later published in leading Hindi national magazines such as "Dharmyug", "Saptahik Hindustan", "Kadambini", "Navneet" and many other reputed magazines. He also contributed to many leading Indian national dailies such as "Navbharat Times", "Dainik Bhaskar", "Nai Dunia". He has authored about 20 books.

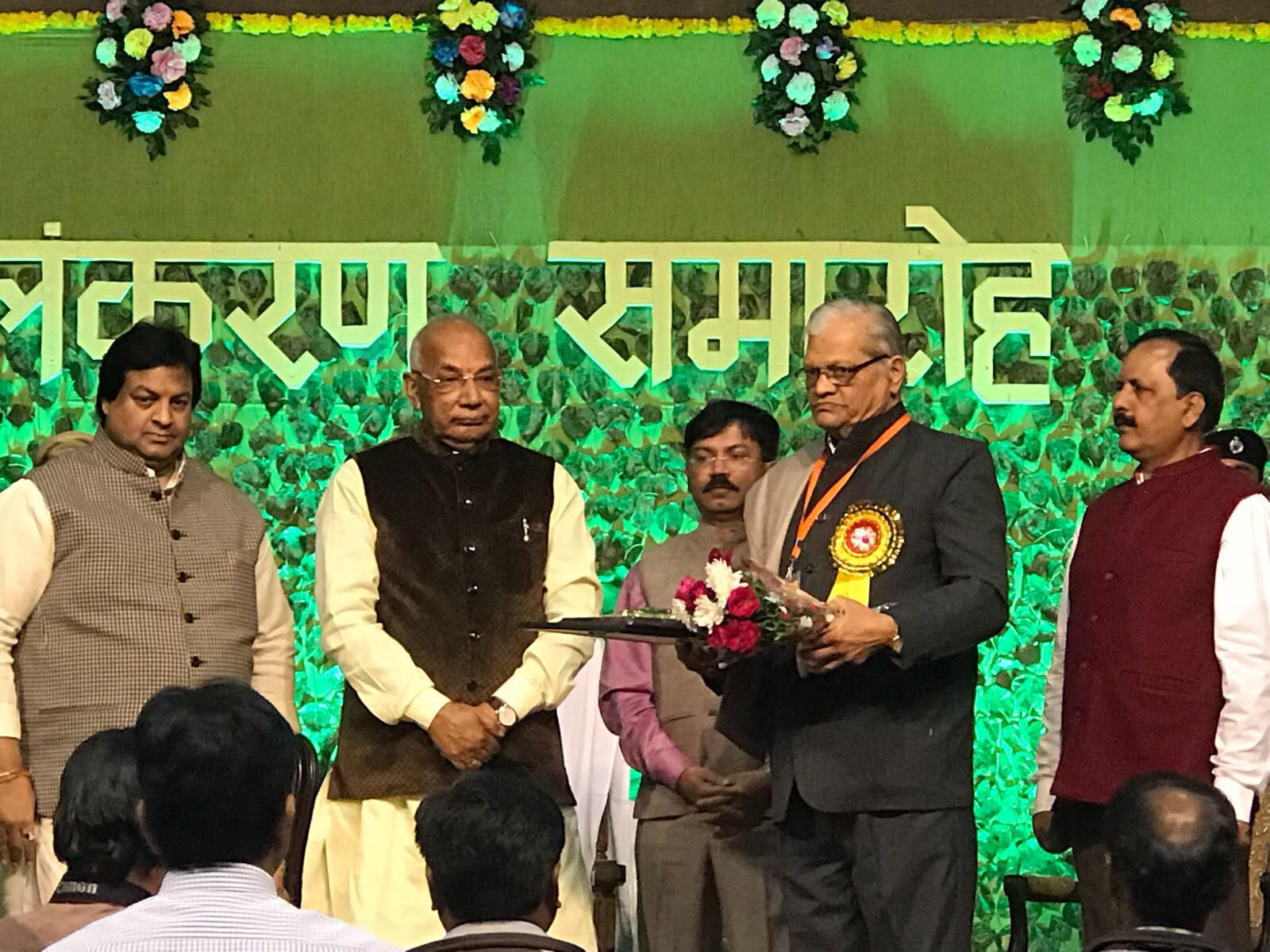

== Literary works and Government censorship ==
In 1982, Dr. Hari Joshi was suspended from Government employment by then Chief Minister of Madhya Pradesh for writing a satirical article Rehearsal Jaree hai" in the section "Aah aur Wah" in leading national daily Dainik Bhaskar on 17 September 1982 . Later writers and journalists came out in support of Dr. Joshi . Leading national dailies such as Times of India, Indian Express, Dharmyug, Dinman, Ravivar, Dainik Bhaskar wrote articles in favour of freedom of speech supporting Dr. Joshi's rights and condemning the unconstitutional step taken by the state Government. On 4 October 1982, then Leader of Opposition of State Assembly Sunderlal Patwa raised this glaring issue in a no confidence motion against the ruling Government. A few months later Hari Joshi was reinstated in Government employment.

In 1997, Housing Board of Madhya Pradesh served a legal notice of defamation for his satirical article "Ishmashan aur Housing Board ka Makaan" published on 17 June 1997 in the section "Kante ki Baat" in the national daily Navbharat Times. The notice was later withdrawn.

== Bibliography ==
Title	Year Published	Publisher
Collection of Poems		
Pankhurian (पंखुरियां)	1969	Prarthana Prakashan Mandir Allahabad
Yantra Yug (यंत्रयुग)	1975	Rashtriya Prakashan Mandir Bhopal
Hari Joshi-67 (हरि जोशी -67)	2011	Pahle Pahal Prakashan Bhopal
Books of Satire		
Akhadon ka Desh (अखाड़ों का देश)	1980	Rashtriya Prakashan Mandir Bhopal
Reherasal Jaree Hai (रिहर्सल जारी है)	1984	Rajesh Prakashan Delhi
Vyangya ke rang (व्यंग्य के रंग)	1992	Sanmarg Prakashan Delhi
Bhed Kee Niyati (भेड़ की नियति)	1993	Anubhav Prakashan Delhi
Asha hai Saanand hain (आशा है,सानंद हैं)	1995	Abhiruchi Prakashan Delhi
Paise ko kaise Ludhka len (पैसे को कैसे लुढ़का लें)	1997	Sanmarg Prakashan Delhi
Saree batein kante kee (सारी बातें कांटे की)	2000	Abhiruchi Prakashan Delhi
Aadmi Athanni Reh Gaya (आदमी अठन्नी रह गया)	2000	Shilalekh Prakashan Delhi
Meri Iqyawan Vyangya Rachnayein (मेरी इक्यावन व्यंग्य रचनाएं)	2004	AbhiruchiPrakashan Delhi
My Sweet Seventeen	2006	Outskirts Press Publication Colorado (US)
Kisse Raeson-Nawabon ke (किस्से रईसों के)	2006	Shilalekh Prakashan Delhi
Iqyawan Shreshtha Vyangya Rachnayen (इक्यावन श्रेष्ठ व्यंग्य रचनाएं)	2009	Diamond Publication Delhi
Neta Nirman Udyog (नेता निर्माण उद्योग)	2011	Satsahitya Prakashan Delhi
America Aisa Bhee Hai (अमेरिका ऐसा भी है)	2015	Shilalekh Prakashan Delhi
Khatti Meethi Yaadein America ki (खट्टी मीठी यादें अमेरिका की)	2019	Aman Prakashan Kanpur
Hamne Khaye Too Bhee Kha (हमने खाये तू भी खा )	2019	Shilalekh Prakashan Delhi
Novels		
Pagdandiyan (पगडंडियां)	1993	Samantar Prakashan Delhi
Mahaguru (महागुरू)	1995	Satsahitya Prakashan Delhi
Wardee (वर्दी)	1998	Abhiruchi Prakashan Delhi
Topi Times (टोपी टाइम्स)	2000	Shilalekh Prakashan Delhi
Takneekee Shiksha ke Mall (तकनीकी शिक्षा के म़ॉल)	2013	Prabhat Prakashan Delhi
Ghuspaithiye (घुसपैठिये)	2015	Rajpal & Sons Delhi
Daadi Desi Pota Bidesi (दादी देसी पोता बिदेसी)	2017	Dilli Pustak Sadan Delhi
Vyangya Ke Tridev (व्यंग्य के त्रिदेव)	2017	Shilalekh Prakashan Delhi
Panhaiyanartan (पन्हैयानर्तन)	2018	Aman Prakashan Kanpur
Bharat Ka Raag - America Ke Rang (भारत का राग - अमेरिका के रंग)	2018	Prabhat Prakashan Delhi
Talaak Tadaak, Talaak Sadaak (तलाक तड़ाक, तलाक सड़ाक)	2019	Aman Prakashan Kanpur
Naari Chingari (नारी चिंगारी)	2019	Aman Prakashan Kanpur
Amerikee Laloo (अमेरिकी लालू)	2020	Aman Prakashan Kanpur
Toofano Se Ghiri Zindagi (तूफानों से घिरी ज़िन्दगी) - Autobiography	2021	India Netbooks Delhi
Punarjanm hi Vishwadharm hai (पुनर्जन्म ही विश्वधर्म है)	2022	India Netbooks Delhi
