= Guru Bhakt Singh 'Bhakt' =

Guru Bhakt Singh 'Bhakt', 7 August 1893 – 17 May 1983) was a poet and dramatist from northern India.

== Early life and family ==
Guru Bhakt Singh was born in a royal rajput family Zamania, in a civil servant family. His father, Shri Kalika Prasad Singh, was a government doctor and held the charge of the Government hospital, Zamania-Ghazipur. After completing his primary education in Ballia and Gorakhpur, he came to Allahabad. Here he completed his B.A. and L.L.B.. After working as an advocate for some time, he switched to a government job. In Allahabad, he came in contact with many famous poets and writers. He was one of the knot of scholars of the Muir Central College, Allahabad which included luminaries like Dr. Amar Nath Jha.

He had two marriages. He was married to Van Shree Devi of Ballia while he was studying in intermediate. Vanshree Devi gave birth to a son named Guru Sharan Singh and died thereafter. Singh immortalised the memory of his first wife in the poem Van Shree Dhvani. His second wife was Shashimukhi Devi of Ballia with whom he had four sons (Kunwar Singh, Kanahaiya Singh, Anand Singh, and Arvind Singh) and four daughters (Nandini, Ratan, Chndrakala, and Shakuntala). His only living son, Anand Singh, was principal of Polytechnic and is a poet. He lives in Lucknow and has two sons (Ashish and Vaibhav) and one daughter (Shweta). His elder and younger both had two sons (Sarvagya, Shaurya, Priyansh & Shivansh).

== Poetry ==
=== Poetic themes ===
Guru Bhakt Singh wrote on various aspects and objects of nature.

=== Career ===
In 1925, his first poetic work, Saras Suman, was published through the efforts of Nagari Pracharini Sabha Ballia. It was successful and his name became known in the world of Hindi poetry. Pt. Ajodhya Singh Upadhya Hariaudh declared him the founder of the Nature school in Hindi and the eminent scholar Dr. Amar Nath Jha saw in him the genius of Wordsworth, sweetness of Hafiz and vividness of Goldsmith. A collection of his poems, mostly on nature, was published later as Kusum Kunj and Bansi Dhwani. In 1935, the dramatic poetry work Nur Jahan was published to wide acclaim. It was later translated into English. Dr. Amarnath Jha, late Vice Chancellor of Allahabad University, called him "The Wordsworth of Hindi Poetry". In 1948 his second mahakavya, Vikramaditya, appeared. It was a historical epic, a dramatic piece of scholarship and research in verse which is included in post-graduate study at various universities.

His son, Arvind Singh, later on took his father's work and wrote a book on it. Due to his death on 30 May 2004, the book remains unpublished. Only three copies were ever made.

=== List of works ===
==== Poetry ====
- Saras Suman (1925)
- Kusum Kunj (1927)
- Vanshidwani (1932)
- Nurjahan (1935)
- Vikramaditya (1944)
- Do Phool (1963)

==== Dramas ====
- Prem-paash (1919) - Unpublished
- Tasneem (1920) - Unpublished
- Radhiya (1924) - Unpublished

== Awards and honours ==
He received the "साहित्य- वारिधि" award in the Uttar Pradesh Hindi Sahitya Samelan. He was honoured by Morarji Desai (the former Prime Minister) in August 1977 for his exemplary services to Hindi literature. He received the "मंगला प्रसाद पारितोषिक" award for Nurjahan. He was also awarded with "रत्नाकर पदक", "बलदेव दास पदक", and "मंगला प्रसाद पारितोषिक".
