= Rajendra Prasad Singh (linguist) =

Indian linguistic scholar and author (born 1965)

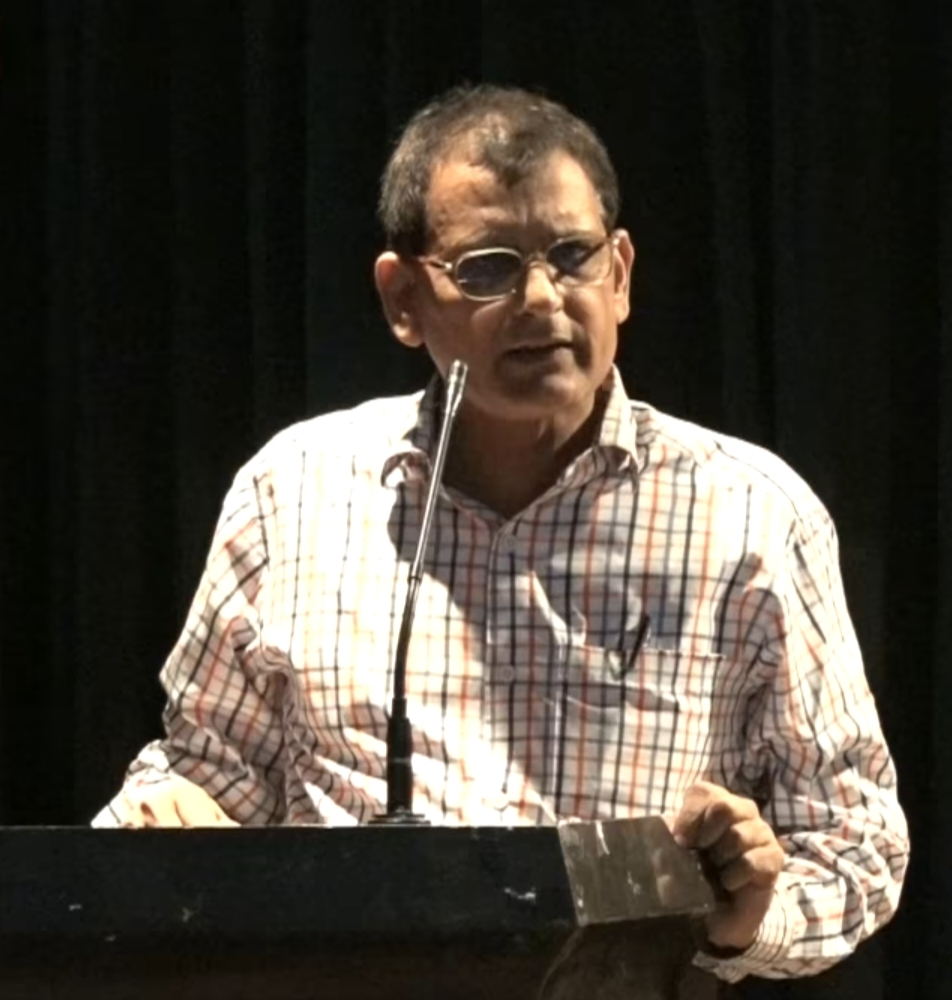
- image during speech in 2016
- Born: 5 November 1965 (age 61); Arang village, Rohtas, Bihar
- Education: Banaras Hindu University
- Occupations: Linguist; historian; author; professor

Rajendra Prasad Singh (born 5 November 1965) is a historian, linguist, professor, and author known for his critical analysis of Indian history and culture. He has been a professor at Shanti Prasad Jain College since 1996 and was promoted to be the Head of Department of Hindi in February 2024. His writings has been published in Bharatiya Bhasha Parishad.

== Early life and career ==
Dr. Singh was born on November 5, 1965, to Budh Ram Singh. He completed his schooling in his hometown. He earned a Bachelor of Arts degree in Hindi and later completed his Master of Arts. In 1994, he received his doctorate in Hindi language from Banaras Hindu University.

He began his career as a lecturer at Veer Kunwar Singh University and, over time, advanced to the position of editor. Eventually, he became a professor at Shanti Prasad Jain Mahavidyalaya, Sasaram, Bihar. He was honored with the Dr. George Grierson Award by the Bihar government for his significant contributions to the field of language studies. In 2025, he took charge as the principal of Rohtas Mahila College, Sasaram.

== Literature ==
He has written plenty of books on language, literature & history from an Indian subaltern lens. His first and following many works/books on linguistics were published by Rajkamal Prakashan.

Some of Singh's books include Bhasha Ka Samaj Shastra (2003) Bhramargeet Itihas Ka Muayana, Buddh Sabhyata Ki Khoj and Chhipaye Raidas Bahar Aaye.
