= Vani Prakashan =

Indian book publishing house

- Founded: 1960
- Founder: Dr. Prem Chand Mahesh
- Country of origin: India
- Headquarters location: New Delhi
- Key people: Arun Maheshwari (Managing director); Aditi Maheshwari (CEO); Damini Maheshwari (Head of Digital Operations)
- Publication types: Books
- Official website: vaniprakashan.com

Vani Prakashan is an Indian book publishing house founded by Prem Chand Mahesh in 1960. It is headquartered in New Delhi and is known for its contributions to Indian literature and publishing.

== History ==
Vani Prakashan was established in 1960 and is known for its contributions to Hindi literature across multiple genres.

In 2021, Vani Prakashan acquired the publishing program of Bharatiya Jnanpith, a publishing house founded in 1944. This acquisition expanded Vani Prakashan's portfolio in the Hindi literary sector. The publishing house also acquired Yatra Books, a publisher focused on translations and English-language works.

== Publishing ==
Vani Prakashan publishes books in six languages, including English and Hindi. Subjects range in topics that include poetry, sociology, and ideology. Over the years, it has published titles in print, electronic, and audio formats, with a distribution across India, as well as online platforms.

The publishing house is associated with library systems in India, the United States, the United Kingdom, and the Middle East. It has been recognized by organizations such as the National Library of Sweden, the Indo-Russian Literary Club, and the Polish government for its contributions to international literary collaboration.

== Awards ==
Vani Prakashan honored by the National Library of Sweden, the Indo-Russian Literary Club and Russian Center of Art Culture, and the Polish government for promoting Indo-Swedish, Indo-Russian, and Indo-Polish literary collaborations.

It is also the first Indian publishing house to receive the Excellence Award from Oxford Business College, United Kingdom. The CEO of the publishing house, Aditi Maheshwari is bestowed with Chevalier Des Arts et des Lettres for publishing in 2023.

== Vani foundation distinguished translator award ==
The Vani Foundation Distinguished Translator Award is a literary honor presented by Vani Prakashan under the aegis of the Vani Foundation.
