= Sarvepalli Radhakrishnan =

President of India from 1962 to 1967

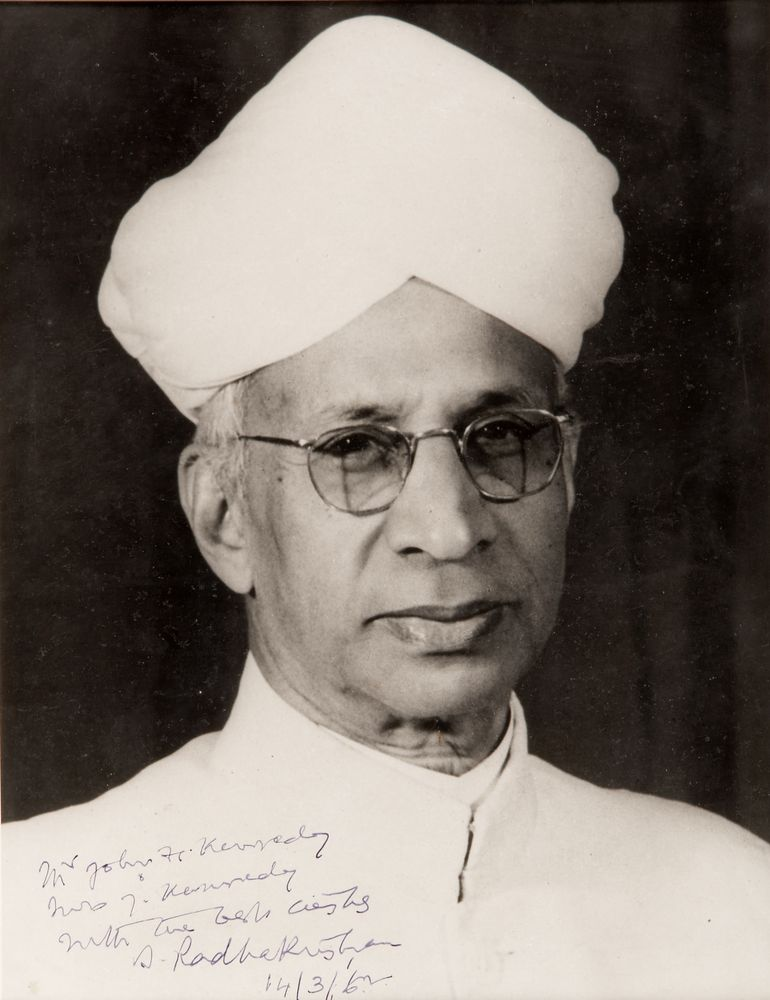
- Official portrait, 1962

President of India
- In office 13 May 1962 – 13 May 1967
- Prime Minister: Jawaharlal Nehru; (Note: Gulzarilal Nanda (interim)); Lal Bahadur Shastri; Indira Gandhi
- Vice President: Zakir Husain
- Preceded by: Rajendra Prasad
- Succeeded by: Zakir Husain

Vice President of India
- In office 13 May 1952 – 12 May 1962
- President: Rajendra Prasad
- Prime Minister: Jawaharlal Nehru
- Preceded by: Office established
- Succeeded by: Zakir Husain

Ambassador of India to Soviet Union
- In office 12 July 1949 – 12 May 1952
- Preceded by: Vijaya Lakshmi Pandit
- Succeeded by: K. P. S. Menon

Vice-Chancellor of Banaras Hindu University
- In office 1939–1948
- Preceded by: Pandit Madan Mohan Malaviya
- Succeeded by: Amarnath Jha

Personal details
- Born: Sarvepalli Radhakrishnayya; 5 September 1888 Thiruttani, Madras Presidency, British India (present-day Tamil Nadu, India)
- Died: 17 April 1975 (aged 86) Madras, Tamil Nadu, India (present-day Chennai)
- Party: Independent
- Spouse: Sarvepalli Sivakamu (m. 1903; died 1956)
- Children: 6, including Gopal
- Occupation: Politician; professor; vice-chancellor
- Profession: Philosopher; academic
- Awards: See below
- Known for: the Indian Philosophy: 2 volume set

Academic background
- Education: Voorhees College, Vellore; Madras Christian College (BA, MA)

Academic work
- Discipline: Philosophy; Indology
- Institutions: Madras Presidency College; Maharaja's College, Mysore; University of Calcutta; Manchester College, Oxford; Andhra University; Banaras Hindu University
- Main interests: Indian philosophy; Indian religions

Sarvepalli Radhakrishnan (Note: In this Telugu name, the person is referred to by his given name, Radhakrishnan, and not by his surname, Sarvepalli.) (5 September 1888 – 17 April 1975) was an Indian academic, philosopher and statesman who served as the Vice President of India from 1952 to 1962 and President of India from 1962 to 1967. He was the ambassador of India to the Soviet Union from 1949 to 1952. He was also the vice-chancellor of Banaras Hindu University from 1939 to 1948 and the vice-chancellor of Andhra University from 1931 to 1936. Radhakrishnan is considered one of the most influential and distinguished 20th century scholars of comparative religion and philosophy, he held the King George V Chair of Mental and Moral Science at the University of Calcutta from 1921 to 1932 and Spalding Chair of Eastern Religion and Ethics at University of Oxford from 1936 to 1952.

Radhakrishnan's philosophy was grounded in Advaita Vedanta, reinterpreting this tradition for a contemporary understanding. He defended Hinduism against what he called "uninformed Western criticism", contributing to the formation of contemporary Hindu identity. He has been influential in shaping the understanding of Hinduism, in both India and the west, and earned a reputation as a bridge-builder between India and the West.

Radhakrishnan received several high awards during his life, including a knighthood in 1931, the Bharat Ratna, India's highest civilian award, in 1954, and honorary membership of the British Royal Order of Merit in 1963. He was also a founder of HelpAge India, a non-profit organisation for elderly underprivileged in India. Radhakrishnan believed that "teachers should be the best minds in the country."

== Early life and education ==
Radhakrishnan was born as Sarvepalli Radhakrishnayya in a Telugu Niyogi Brahmin family of Sarvepalli Veeraswami and Sithamma. He was the fourth born of six siblings (five brothers and one sister), in Tiruttani of North Arcot district in the erstwhile Madras Presidency (now in Tiruvallur district of Tamil Nadu). His family hails from Sarvepalli village in Nellore district of Andhra Pradesh. His early years were spent in Thiruttani and Tirupati. His father was a subordinate revenue official in the service of a local Zamindar (local landlord). His primary education was at K. V. High School at Thiruttani. In 1896 he moved to the Hermansburg Evangelical Lutheran Mission School in Tirupati and Government High Secondary School, Walajapet.

=== Education ===
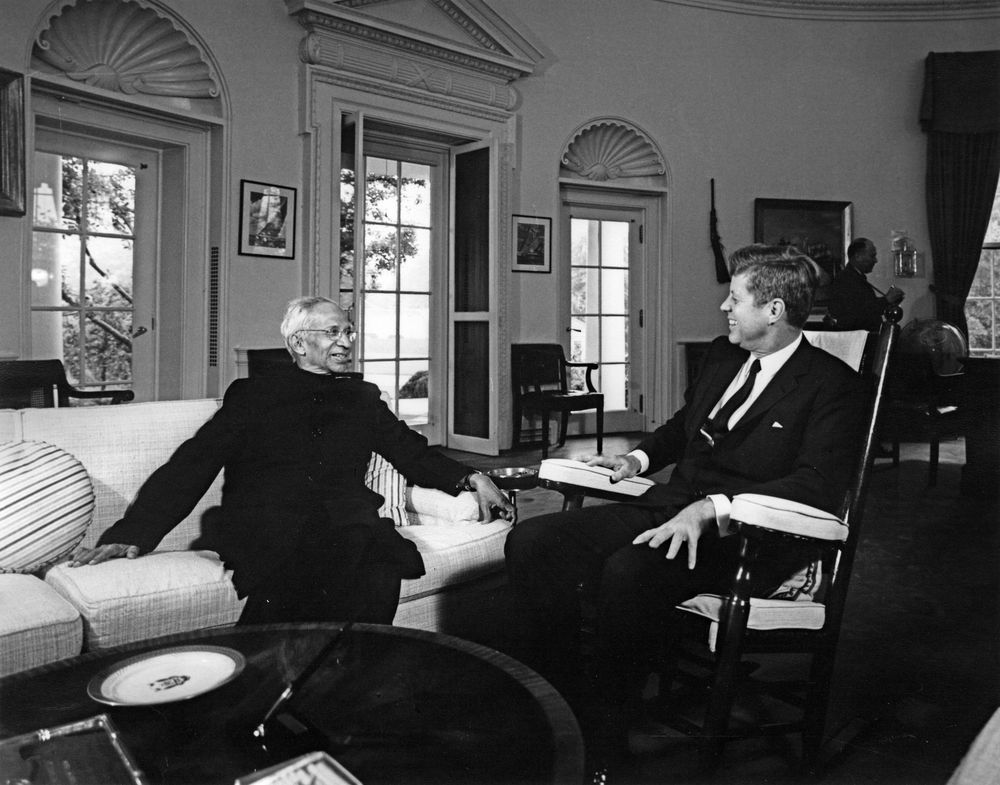
Indian President Sarvepalli Radhakrishnan with US President John F. Kennedy in the Oval Office, 1963

Radhakrishnan was awarded scholarships throughout his academic life. He joined Voorhees College in Vellore for his high school education. After his F.A. (First of Arts) class, he joined the Madras Christian College (affiliated to the University of Madras) at the age of 16. He graduated from there in 1907, and also finished his master's degree from the same college.

Radhakrishnan studied philosophy by chance rather than choice. He had wished to study mathematics. Being a financially constrained student, when a cousin who graduated from the same college passed on his philosophy textbooks to Radhakrishnan, it automatically decided his academics course.

Sarvepalli wrote his bachelor's degree thesis on "The Ethics of the Vedanta and its Metaphysical Presuppositions". It was intended to be a reply to the charge that the Vedanta system had no room for ethics. Two of his professors, William Meston and Alfred George Hogg, commended Radhakrishnan's dissertation. Radhakrishnan's thesis was published when he was only twenty. According to Radhakrishnan himself, the criticism of Hogg and other Christian teachers of Indian culture "disturbed my faith and shook the traditional props on which I leaned." Radhakrishnan himself describes how, as a student,

The challenge of Christian critics impelled me to make a study of Hinduism and find out what is living and what is dead in it. My pride as a Hindu, roused by the enterprise and eloquence of Swami Vivekananda, was deeply hurt by the treatment accorded to Hinduism in missionary institutions.

This led him to his critical study of Indian philosophy and religion and a lifelong defence of Hinduism against "uninformed Western criticism". At the same time, Radhakrishnan commended Professor Hogg as 'My distinguished teacher,' and as "one of the greatest Christian thinkers we had in India.' Besides, Professor William Skinner, who was acting Principal of the College, gave a testimonial saying "he is one of the best men we have had in the recent years", which enabled him to get the first job in Presidency College. In reciprocation, Radhakrishnan dedicated one of his early books to William Skinner.

The Spirit of Abheda

Radhakrishnan expresses his anguish, against the British critics, in The Ethics of the Vedanta. Here he wrote, "it has become philosophic fashion of the present day to consider the Vedanta system a non-ethical one." He quotes a German-born philologist and Orientalist, who lived and studied in Britain for most of his life, Max Muller as stating, "The Vedanta philosophy has not neglected the important sphere of ethics; but on the contrary, we find ethics in the beginning, ethics in the middle, and ethics in the end, to say nothing of the fact that minds, so engrossed with divine things as Vedanta philosophers, are not likely to fall victims to the ordinary temptations of the world, the flesh, and other powers."

Radhakrishnan then explains how this philosophy requires us (people) to look upon all creations as one. As non-different. This is where he introduces "The Spirit of Abheda". He quotes, "In morals, the individual is enjoined to cultivate a Spirit of Abheda, or non-difference." Thus he mentions how this "naturally leads to the ethics of love and brotherhood".

"Every other individual is to be regarded as your co-equal, and treated as an end, not a means."

"The Vedanta requires us to respect human dignity and demands the recognition of man as man."

== Personal life ==
Radhakrishnan was married to Sivakamu (Note: Radhakrishnan's wife's name is spelled differently in different sources, perhaps because a common Telugu spelling is Sivamma. It is spelled Sivakamu by Sarvepalli Gopal (1989); Sivakamuamma by Mamta Anand (2006); and still differently by others.) (1893–1956) in May 1903, a distant cousin, at the age of 14, when she was aged 10. As per tradition the marriage was arranged by the family. The couple had five daughters named Padmavati, Rukmini, Sushila, Sundari and Shakuntala. Their youngest child was a son named Sarvepalli Gopal who went on to a notable career as a historian. Many of Radhakrishnan's family members including his grandchildren and great-grandchildren have pursued a wide range of careers in academia, public policy, medicine, law, banking, business, publishing and other fields across the world. Sivakamu died on 26 November 1956. They were married for about 52 years.

Radhakrishnan remained a lacto-vegetarian throughout his life and was a non-smoker and teetotaller. He enjoyed reading and attending local music concerts.

== Academic career ==
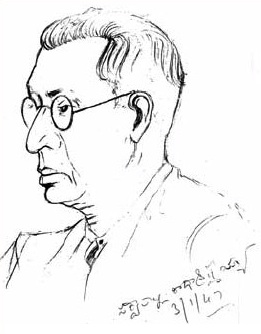
Sarvepalli Radhakrishnan drawn by Bujjai and signed by Sarvepalli in Telugu as "Radhakrishnayya".

In April 1909, Radhakrishnan was appointed to the Department of Philosophy at the Madras Presidency College. Thereafter, in 1918, he was selected as Professor of Philosophy by the University of Mysore, where he taught at its Maharaja's College, Mysore. Here, Radhakrishnan along with M. Hiriyanna and A. R. Wadia groomed M. Yamunacharya, who would later hold post of Professor in Philosophy in the Department of Philosophy at Maharaja College, Mysore. By that time he had written many articles for journals of repute like The Quest, Journal of Philosophy and the International Journal of Ethics. He also completed his first book, The Philosophy of Rabindranath Tagore, which was published in 1918. He believed Tagore's philosophy to be the "genuine manifestation of the Indian spirit". His second book, The Reign of Religion in Contemporary Philosophy was published in 1920.

In 1921 he was appointed as a professor in philosophy to occupy the King George V Chair of Mental and Moral Science at the University of Calcutta. He represented the University of Calcutta at the Congress of the Universities of the British Empire in June 1926 and the International Congress of Philosophy at Harvard University in September 1926. Another important academic event during this period was the invitation to deliver the Hibbert Lecture on the ideals of life which he delivered at Manchester College, Oxford in 1929 and which was subsequently published in book form as An Idealist View of Life.

In 1929 Radhakrishnan was invited to take the post vacated by Principal J. Estlin Carpenter at Manchester College. This gave him the opportunity to lecture to the students of the University of Oxford on Comparative Religion. For his services to education he was knighted by King George V in the June 1931 Birthday Honours, and formally invested with his honour by the Governor-General of India, the Earl of Willingdon, in March 1932. However, he ceased to use the title after Indian independence, preferring instead his academic title of 'Doctor'.

He was the vice-chancellor of Andhra University from 1931 to 1936. During his first convocation address, he spoke about his native Andhra as,

We, the Andhras, are fortunately situated in some respects. I firmly believe that if any part of India is capable of developing an effective sense of unity it is in Andhra. The hold of conservatism is not strong. Our generosity of spirit and openness of mind are well -known. Our social instinct and suggestibility are still active. Our moral sense and sympathetic imagination are not much warped by dogmas. Our women are relatively more free. Love of the mother-tongue binds us all.

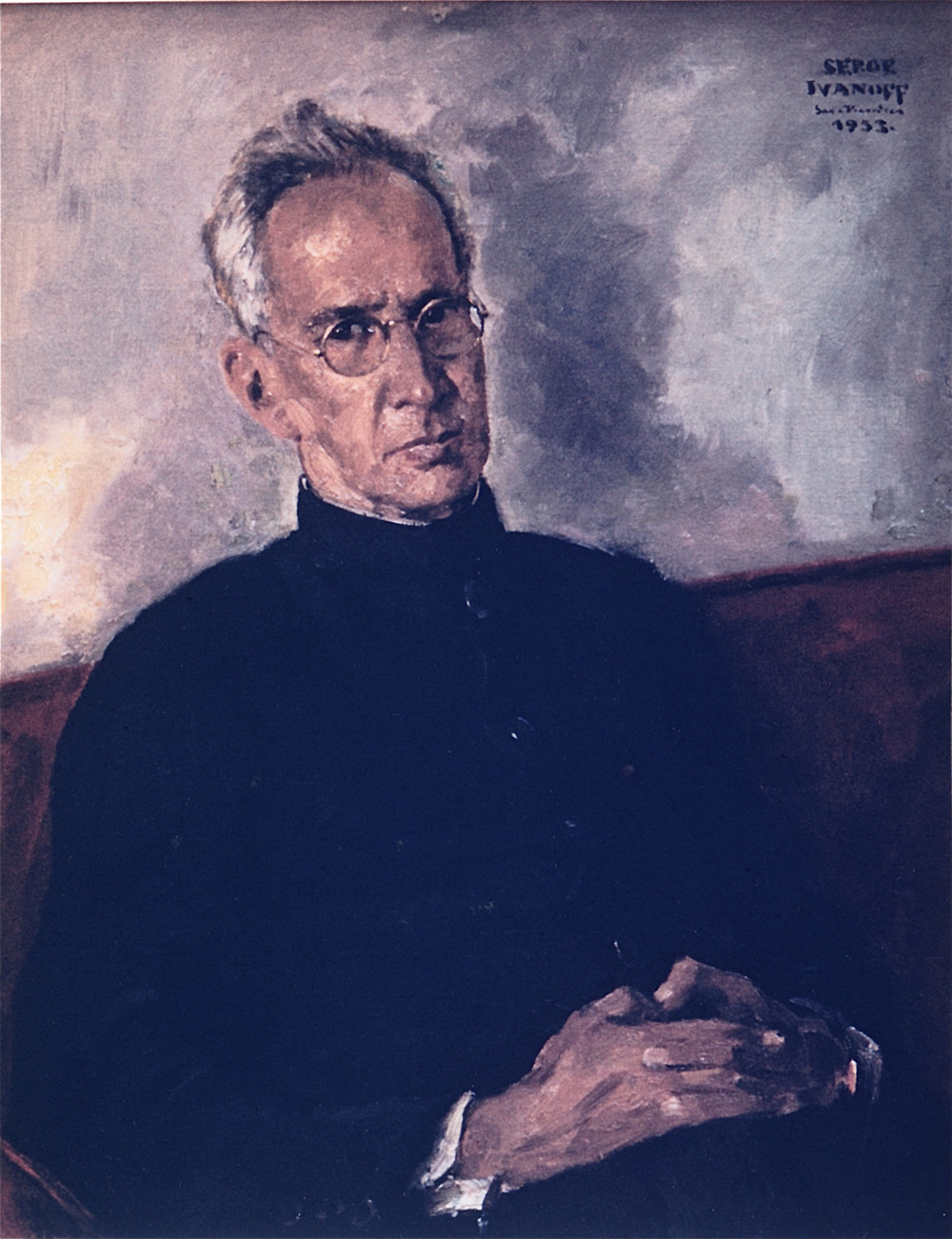
Portrait of Sarvepalli Radhakrishnan by Serge Ivanoff 1953.

In 1936 Radhakrishnan was named Spalding Professor of Eastern Religion and Ethics at the University of Oxford, and was elected a Fellow of All Souls College. That same year, and again in 1937, he was nominated for the Nobel Prize in Literature, although this nomination process, as for all laureates, was not public at the time. Further nominations for the awards continued steadily throughout the 1960s. In 1939 Pt. Madan Mohan Malaviya invited him to succeed him as the Vice-Chancellor of Banaras Hindu University (BHU). He served as its Vice-Chancellor till January 1948.

== Political career ==
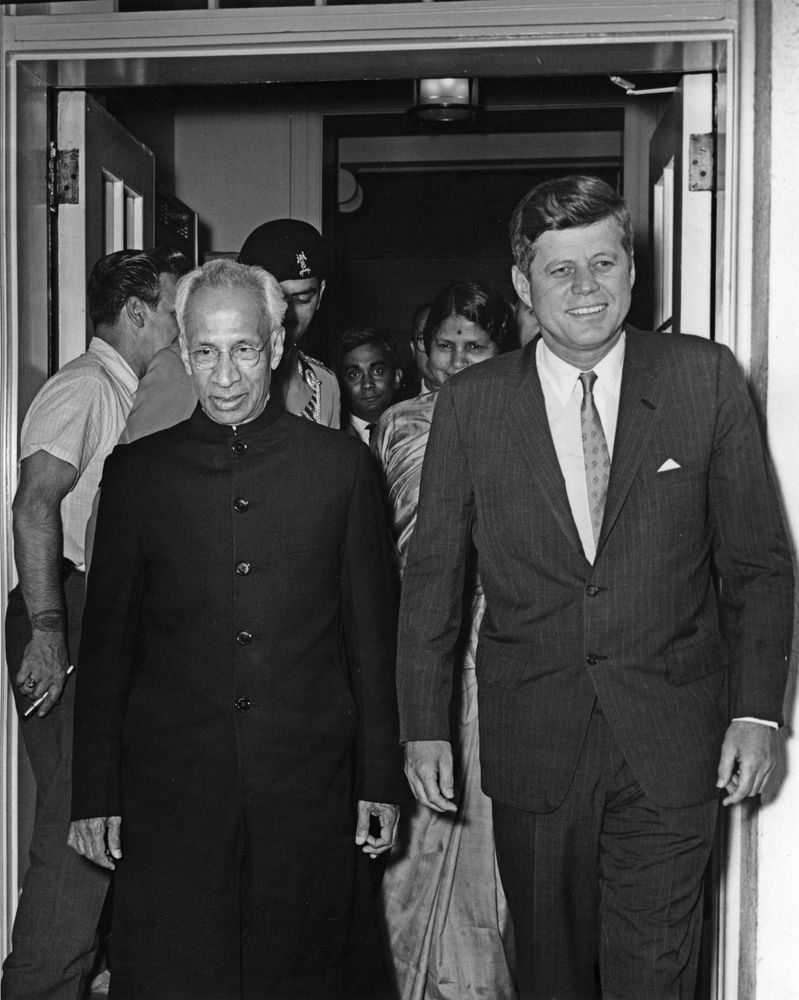
President of United States John F. Kennedy and President of India, Sarvepalli Radhakrishnan (left), depart the White House following a meeting. Minister of External Affairs of India, Lakshmi N. Menon, walks behind President Kennedy at West Wing Entrance, White House, Washington, D.C., on 4 June 1963

Radhakrishnan started his political career "rather late in life", after his successful academic career. His international authority preceded his political career. He was one of those stalwarts who attended Andhra Mahasabha in 1928 where he seconded the idea of renaming Ceded Districts division of Madras Presidency as Rayalaseema. In 1931 he was nominated to the League of Nations Committee for Intellectual Cooperation, where after "in Western eyes he was the recognized Hindu authority on Indian ideas and a persuasive interpreter of the role of Eastern institutions in contemporary society."

When India became independent in 1947, Radhakrishnan represented India at UNESCO (1946–52) and was later Ambassador of India to the Soviet Union, from 1949 to 1952. He was also elected to the Constituent Assembly of India.

=== As Vice President and President ===
==== Vice presidential election and Presidential election ====
Radhakrishnan was elected as the first Vice President of India in 1952, and elected as the second President of India (1962–1967). Radhakrishnan did not have a background in the Congress Party, nor was he active in the Indian independence movement. He was the politician in shadow. His motivation lay in his pride of Hindu culture, and the defence of Hinduism against "uninformed Western criticism". According to the historian Donald Mackenzie Brown,

He had always defended Hindu culture against uninformed Western criticism and had symbolized the pride of Indians in their own intellectual traditions.

=== Teacher's Day ===
When Radhakrishnan became the President of India, some of his students and friends requested him to allow them to celebrate his birthday, on 5 September. He replied,

Instead of celebrating my birthday, it would be my proud privilege if September 5th is observed as Teachers' Day.

His birthday has since been celebrated as Teachers' Day in India.

=== Death ===
Dr. Sarvepalli Radhakrishnan died of natural causes on 17 April 1975, at the age of 86, in Madras (now Chennai), India.

=== Charity ===
Along with G. D. Birla and some other social workers in the pre-independence era, Radhakrishnan formed the Krishnarpan Charity Trust.

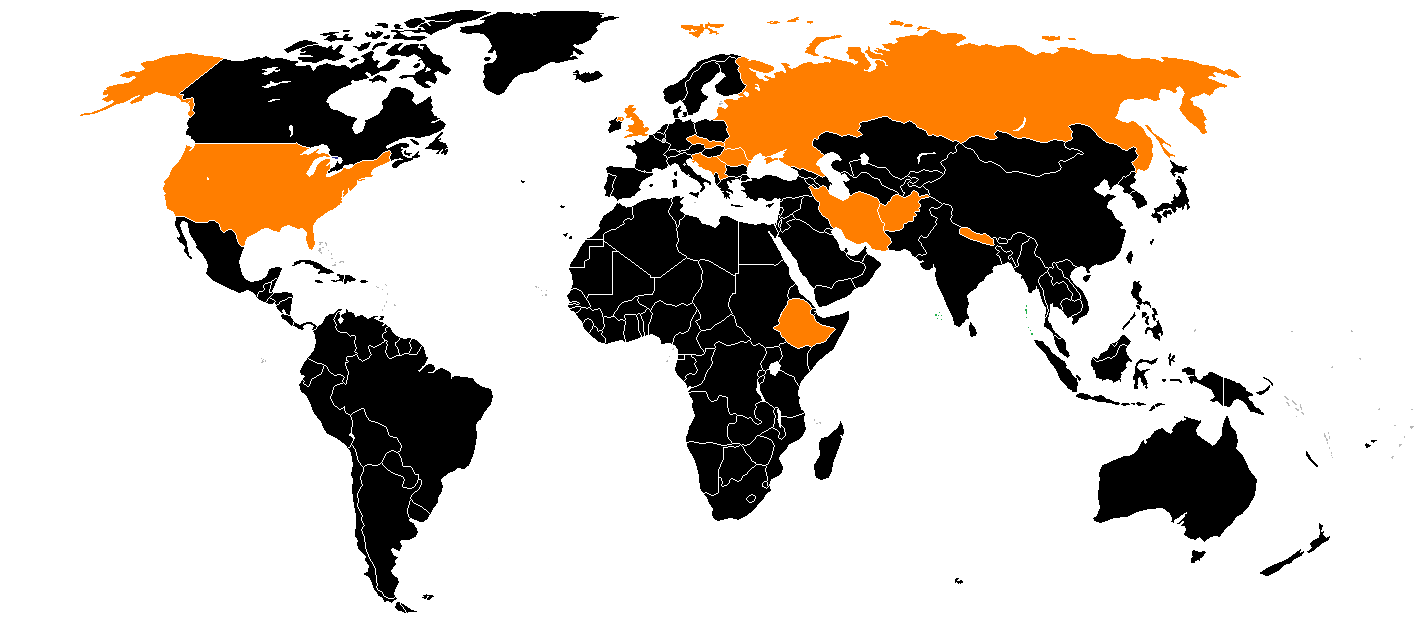
As President of India, Radhakrishnan made 11 state visits including visits to both the US and the USSR.

== Role in Constituent Assembly ==
He was against State institutions imparting denominational religious instruction as it was against the secular vision of the Indian State.

=== Global policy ===
Along with Albert Einstein, Radhakrishnan, the second president of India and the first vice president of India, was one of the sponsors of the Peoples' World Convention (PWC), also known as Peoples' World Constituent Assembly (PWCA), which took place in 1950–51 at Palais Electoral, Geneva, Switzerland.

== Philosophy ==
Radhakrishnan tried to bridge eastern and western thought, defending Hinduism against "uninformed Western criticism", but also incorporating Western philosophical and religious thought.

=== Advaita Vedanta ===
Radhakrishnan was one of the most prominent spokesmen of Neo-Vedanta. His metaphysics was grounded in Advaita Vedanta, but he reinterpreted Advaita Vedanta for a contemporary understanding. He acknowledged the reality and diversity of the world of experience, which he saw as grounded in and supported by the absolute or Brahman. (Note: Neo-Vedanta seems to be closer to Bhedabheda-Vedanta than to Shankara's Advaita Vedanta, with the acknowledgement of the reality of the world. Nicholas F. Gier: "Ramakrsna, Svami Vivekananda, and Aurobindo (I also include M.K. Gandhi) have been labeled "neo-Vedantists," a philosophy that rejects the Advaitins' claim that the world is illusory. Aurobindo, in his The Life Divine, declares that he has moved from Sankara's "universal illusionism" to his own "universal realism" (2005: 432), defined as metaphysical realism in the European philosophical sense of the term.") Radhakrishnan also reinterpreted Shankara's notion of maya. According to Radhakrishnan, maya is not a strict absolute idealism, but "a subjective misperception of the world as ultimately real."

=== Intuition and religious experience ===
"Intuition", synonymously called "religious experience", has a central place in Radhakrishnan's philosophy as a source of knowledge which is not mediated by conscious thought. His specific interest in experience can be traced back to the works of William James (1842–1910), F. H. Bradley (1846–1924), Henri Bergson (1859–1941), and Friedrich von Hügel (1852–1925), and to Vivekananda (1863–1902), who had a strong influence on Sarvepalli's thought. According to Radhakrishnan, intuition is of a self-certifying character (svatassiddha), self-evidencing (svāsaṃvedya) and self-luminous (svayam-prakāsa). In his book An Idealist View of Life, he made a case for the importance of intuitive thinking as opposed to purely intellectual forms of thought. According to Radhakrishnan, intuition plays a specific role in all kinds of experience.

Radhakrishnan discernes eight sorts of experience:

1. Cognitive Experience:
2. Sense Experience
3. Discursive Reasoning
4. Intuitive Apprehension
5. Psychic Experience
6. Aesthetic Experience
7. Ethical Experience
8. Religious Experience

=== Classification of religions ===
For Radhakrishnan, theology and creeds are intellectual formulations, and symbols of religious experience or "religious intuitions". Radhakrishnan qualified the variety of religions hierarchically according to their apprehension of "religious experience", giving Advaita Vedanta the highest place: (Note: This qualification is not unique to Radhakrishnan. It was developed by nineteenth-century Indologists, and was highly influential in the understanding of Hinduism, both in the west and in India.Hinduism Philosophy and Identity in Indian Intellectual History)

1. The worshippers of the Absolute
2. The worshippers of the personal God
3. The worshippers of the incarnations like Rama, Kṛiṣhṇa, Buddha
4. Those who worship ancestors, deities and sages
5. The worshippers of the petty forces and spirits

Radhakrishnan saw Hinduism as a scientific religion based on facts, apprehended via intuition or religious experience. According to Radhakrishnan, "if philosophy of religion is to become scientific, it must become empirical and found itself on religious experience". He saw this empiricism exemplified in the Vedas:

The truths of the ṛṣis are not evolved as the result of logical reasoning or systematic philosophy but are the products of spiritual intuition, dṛṣti or vision. The ṛṣis are not so much the authors of the truths recorded in the Vedas as the seers who were able to discern the eternal truths by raising their life-spirit to the plane of universal spirit. They are the pioneer researchers in the realm of the spirit who saw more in the world than their followers. Their utterances are not based on transitory vision but on a continuous experience of resident life and power. When the Vedas are regarded as the highest authority, all that is meant is that the most exacting of all authorities is the authority of facts.

From his writings collected as The Hindu View of Life, Upton Lectures, Delivered at Manchester College, Oxford, 1926: "Hinduism insists on our working steadily upwards in improving our knowledge of God. The worshippers of the absolute are of the highest rank; second to them are the worshippers of the personal God; then come the worshippers of the incarnations of Rama, Krishna, Buddha; below them are those who worship deities, ancestors, and sages, and lowest of all are the worshippers of petty forces and spirits. The deities of some men are in water (i.e., bathing places), those of the most advanced are in the heavens, those of the children (in religion) are in the images of wood and stone, but the sage finds his God in his deeper self. The man of action finds his God in fire, the man of feeling in the heart, and the feeble minded in the idol, but the strong in spirit find God everywhere". The seers see the supreme in the self, and not the images."

To Radhakrishnan, Advaita Vedanta was the best representative of Hinduism, as being grounded in intuition, in contrast to the "intellectually mediated interpretations" of other religions. (Note: Anubhava is a central term in Shankara's writings. According to several modern interpretators, especially Radakrishnan, Shankara emphasises the role of personal experience (anubhava) in ascertaining the validity of knowledge. Yet, according to Rambacham himself, sruti, or textual authority, is the main source of knowledge for Shankara.) He objected against charges of "quietism" (Note: Sweetman: "[T]he supposed quietist and conservative nature of Vedantic thought") and "world denial", instead stressing the need and ethic of social service, giving a modern interpretation of classical terms as tat-tvam-asi. According to Radhakrishnan, Vedanta offers the most direct intuitive experience and inner realisation, which makes it the highest form of religion:

The Vedanta is not a religion, but religion itself in its most universal and deepest significance.

Radhakrishnan saw other religions, "including what Dr. S. Radhakrishnan understands as lower forms of Hinduism," as interpretations of Advaita Vedanta, thereby Hinduising all religions.

Although Radhakrishnan was well-acquainted with western culture and philosophy, he was also critical of them. He stated that Western philosophers, despite all claims to objectivity, were influenced by theological influences of their own culture.

== Influence ==
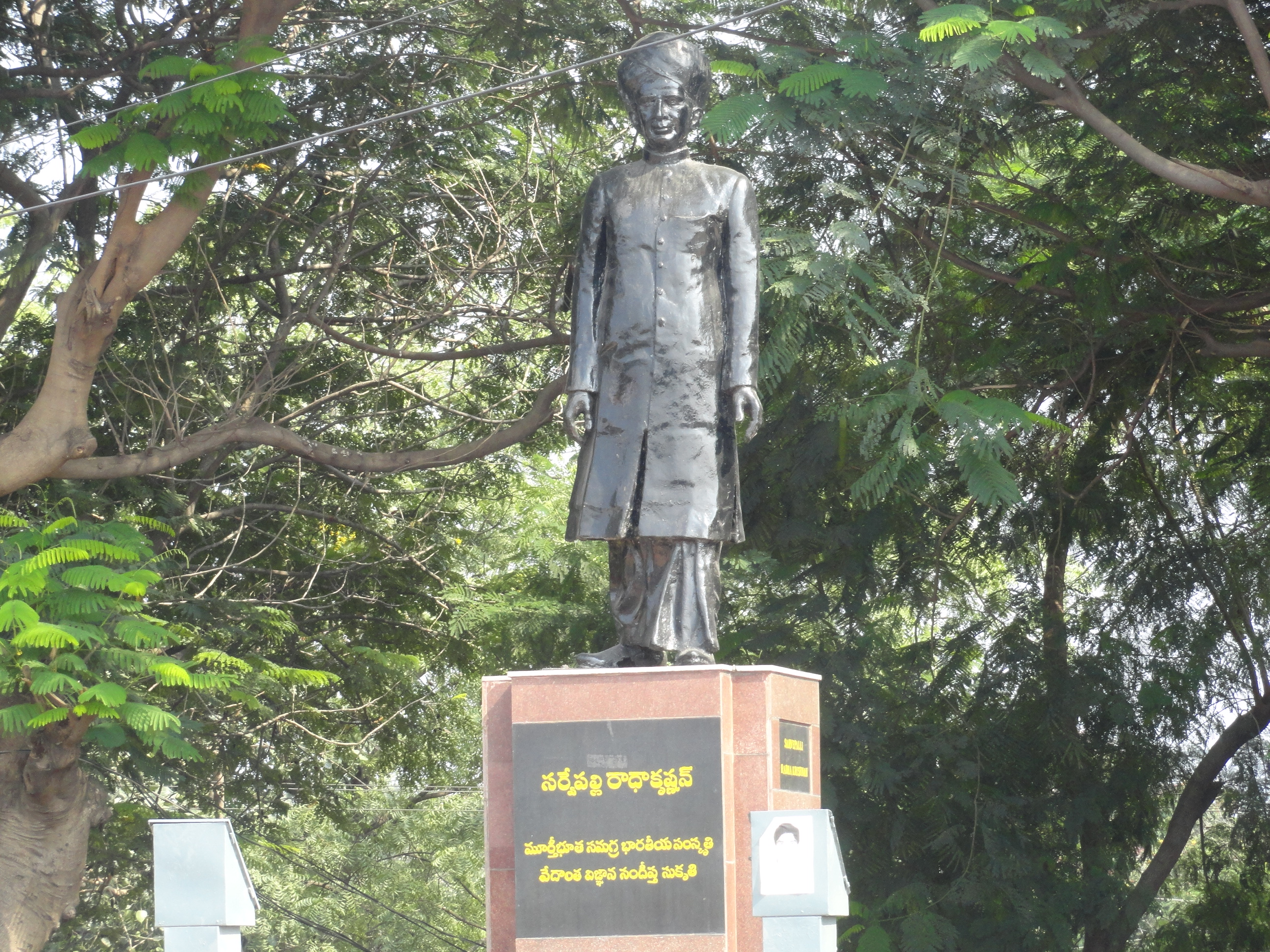
Statue of Sarvepalli at Hyderabad (Tankbund)

Radhakrishnan was one of world's best and most influential twentieth-century scholars of comparative religion and philosophy.

Radhakrishnan's defence of the Hindu traditions has been highly influential, both in India and the western world. In India, Radhakrishnan's ideas contributed to the formation of India as a nation-state. Radhakrishnan's writings contributed to the hegemonic status of Vedanta as "the essential world view of Hinduism". In the western world, Radhakrishnan's interpretations of the Hindu tradition, and his emphasis on "spiritual experience", made Hinduism more readily accessible for a western audience, and contributed to the influence Hinduism has on modern spirituality:

In figures such as Vivekananda and Radhakrishnan we witness Vedanta traveling to the West, where it nourished the spiritual hunger of Europeans and Americans in the early decades of the twentieth century.

=== Appraisal ===
Radhakrishnan has been highly appraised. According to Paul Artur Schillp:

Nor would it be possible to find a more excellent example of a living "bridge" between the East and the West than Professor Radhakrishnan. Steeped, as Radhakrishnan has been since his childhood, in the life, traditions, and philosophical heritage of his native India, he has also struck deep roots in Western philosophy, which he has been studying tirelessly ever since his undergraduate college-days in Madras Christian College, and in which he is as thoroughly at home as any Western philosopher.

And according to Hawley:

Radhakrishnan's concern for experience and his extensive knowledge of the Western philosophical and literary traditions has earned him the reputation of being a bridge-builder between India and the West. He often appears to feel at home in the Indian as well as the Western philosophical contexts, and draws from both Western and Indian sources throughout his writing. Because of this, Radhakrishnan has been held up in academic circles as a representative of Hinduism to the West. His lengthy writing career and his many published works have been influential in shaping the West's understanding of Hinduism, India, and the East.

=== Criticism and context ===
Radhakrishnan's ideas have also received criticism and challenges, for their perennialist and universalist claims, and the use of an east–west dichotomy.

==== Perennialism ====
According to Radhakrishnan, there is not only an underlying "divine unity" from the seers of the Upanishads up to modern Hindus like Tagore and Gandhi, but also "an essential commonality between philosophical and religious traditions from widely disparate cultures." This is also a major theme in the works of Rene Guenon, the Theosophical Society, and the contemporary popularity of eastern religions in modern spirituality. Since the 1970s, the Perennialist position has been criticised for its essentialism. Social-constructionists give an alternative approach to religious experience, in which such "experiences" are seen as being determined and mediated by cultural determinants: (Note: See, especially, Steven T. Katz: Mysticism and Philosophical Analysis (Oxford University Press, 1978); Mysticism and Religious Traditions (Oxford University Press, 1983); Mysticism and Language (Oxford University Press, 1992); Mysticism and Sacred Scripture (Oxford University Press, 2000))

As Michaels notes:

Religions, too, rely not so much on individual experiences or on innate feelings – like a sensus numinosus (Rudolf Otto) – but rather on behavioral patterns acquired and learned in childhood.

Rinehart also points out that "perennialist claims notwithstanding, modern Hindu thought is a product of history", which "has been worked out and expressed in a variety of historical contexts over the preceding two hundreds years." This is also true for Radhakrishan, who was educated by missionaries and, like other neo-Vedantins, used the prevalent western understanding of India and its culture to present an alternative to the western critique.

==== Universalism, communalism and Hindu nationalism ====
According to Richard King, the elevation of Vedanta as the essence of Hinduism, and Advaita Vedanta as the "paradigmatic example of the mystical nature of the Hindu religion" by colonial Indologists but also neo-Vedantins served well for the Hindu nationalists, who further popularised this notion of Advaita Vedanta as the pinnacle of Indian religions. It

...provided an opportunity for the construction of a nationalist ideology that could unite Hindus in their struggle against colonial oppression.

This "opportunity" has been criticised. According to Sucheta Mazumdar and Vasant Kaiwar,

... Indian nationalist leaders continued to operate within the categorical field generated by politicized religion [...] Extravagant claims were made on behalf of Oriental civilization. Sarvepalli Radhakrishnan's statement – "[t]he Vedanta is not a religion but religion itself in its "most universal and deepest significance" – is fairly typical.

Rinehart also criticises the inclusivity of Radhakrishnan's approach, since it provides "a theological scheme for subsuming religious difference under the aegis of Vedantic truth." (Note: Rinehart: "Though neo-Hindu authors prefer the idiom of tolerance to that of inclusivism, it is clear that what is advocated is less a secular view of toleration than a theological scheme for subsuming religious difference under the aegis of Vedantic truth. Thus Radhakrishnan's view of experience as the core of religious truth effectively leads to harmony only when and if other religions are willing to assume a position under the umbrella of Vedanta. We might even say that the theme of neo-Hindu tolerance provided the Hindu not simply with a means to claiming the right to stand alongside the other world religions, but with a strategy for promoting Hinduism as the ultimate form of religion itself.") According to Rinehart, the consequence of this line of reasoning is communalism, the idea that "all people belonging to one religion have common economic, social and political interests and these interests are contrary to the interests of those belonging to another religion." Rinehart notes that Hindu religiosity plays an important role in the nationalist movement, and that "the neo-Hindu discourse is the unintended consequence of the initial moves made by thinkers like Rammohan Roy and Vivekananda." Yet Rinehart also points out that it is

...clear that there isn't a neat line of causation that leads from the philosophies of Rammohan Roy, Vivekananda and Radhakrishnan to the agenda of [...] militant Hindus. (Note: Neither is Radhakrishnan's "use" of religion in the defence of Asian culture and society against colonialism unique for his person, or India in general. The complexities of Asian nationalism are to be seen and understood in the context of colonialism, modernisation and nation-building. See, for example, Anagarika Dharmapala, for the role of Theravada Buddhism in Sri Lankese struggle for independence, and D.T. Suzuki, who conjuncted Zen to Japanese nationalism and militarism, in defence against both western hegemony and the pressure on Japanese Zen during the Meiji Restoration to conform to Shinbutsu Bunri.)

==== Post-colonialism ====
Colonialism left deep traces in the hearts and minds of the Indian people, influencing the way they understood and represented themselves. The influences of "colonialist forms of knowledge" can also be found in the works of Radhakrishnan. According to Hawley, Radhakrishnan's division between East and West, the East being spiritual and mystical, and the West being rationalist and logical in its forms of knowledge, was constructed during the 18th and 19th centuries. Arguably, these characterisations are "imagined" in the sense that they reflect the philosophical and religious realities of neither "East' nor West."

Since the 1990s, the colonial influences on the 'construction' and 'representation' of Hinduism have been the topic of debate among scholars of Hinduism. Western Indologists are trying to come to more neutral and better-informed representations of India and its culture, while Indian scholars are trying to establish forms of knowledge and understanding which are grounded in and informed by Indian traditions, instead of being dominated by western forms of knowledge and understanding. (Note: Sweetman mentions: Wilhelm Halbfass (1988), India and Europe; IXth European Conference on Modern Asian Studies in Heidelberg (1989), Hinduism Reconsidered; Ronald Inden, Imagining India; Carol Breckenridge and Peter van der Veer, Orientalism and the Postcolonial Predicament; Vasudha Dalmia and Heinrich von Stietencron, Representing Hinduism; S.N. Balagangadhara, The Heathen in his Blindness...; Thomas Trautmann, Aryans and British India; Richard King (1989), Orientalism and religion; See also Postcolonialism and Mrinal Kaud, The "Pizza Effect" in Indian Philosophy)

==== Feud with The Modern Review ====
Radhakrishnan's appointment, as a southerner, to "the most important chair of philosophy in India" in the north, was resented by a number of people from the Bengali intellectual elite, and The Modern Review, which was critical of the appointment of non-Bengalis, became the main vehicle of criticism. Soon after his arrival in Calcutta in 1921, Radhakrishnan's writings were regularly criticised in The Modern Review. When Radhakrishnan published his Indian Philosophy in two volumes (1923 and 1927), The Modern Review questioned his use of sources, criticising the lack of references to Bengali scholars. Yet, in an editor's note, The Modern Review acknowledged that "As professor's Radhakrishnan's book has not been received for review in this Journal, The Modern Review is not in a position to form any opinion on it."

In the January 1929 issue of The Modern Review, the Bengali philosopher Jadunath Sinha made the claim that parts of his 1922 doctoral thesis, Indian Psychology of Perception, published in 1925, were copied by his teacher Radhakrishnan into the chapter on "The Yoga system of Patanjali" in his book Indian Philosophy II, published in 1927. Sinha and Radhakrishnan exchanged several letters in the Modern Review, in which Sinha compared parts of his thesis with Radhakrishnan's publication, presenting altogether 110 instances of "borrowings." Radhakrishnan felt compelled to respond, stating that Sinha and he had both used the same classical texts, that his translations were standard translations, and that similarities in translations were therefore unavoidable. He further argued that he was lecturing on the subject before publishing his book, and that his book was ready for publication in 1924, before Sinha's thesis was published.

Scholars such as Kuppuswami Sastri, Ganganath Jha, and Nalini Ganguli confirmed that Radhakrishnan was distributing the notes in question since 1922. Ramananda Chatterjee, the editor of The Modern Review, refused to publish a letter by Nalini Ganguli confirming this fact, while continuing publishing Sinha's letters. The General Editor of Radhakrishnan's publisher, professor Muirhead, further confirmed that the publication was delayed for three years, due to his stay in the United States.

In Summer 1929, the dispute escalated into a juristic fight. Responding to the alleged "systematic effort [...] to destroy Radhakrishnan's reputation as a scholar and a public figure," Radhakrishnan filed a suit for defamation of character against Sinha and Chatterjee, demanding Rs. 100,000 for the damage done, and Sinha filed a case against Radhakrishnan for copyright infringement, demanding Rs. 20,000. (Note: The timeline is not clear from these sources. According to Gopal, Radhakrishnan filed his lawsuit in the summer of 1929, to which Sinha filed a clounter-claim. According to Minor and Murty & Vohra, Sinha filed a lawsuit first, to which Radhakrishnan responded.) The suits were settled in May 1933, the terms of the settlement were not disclosed, and "all the allegations made in the pleadings and in the columns of the Modern Review were withdrawn."

== Awards and honours ==
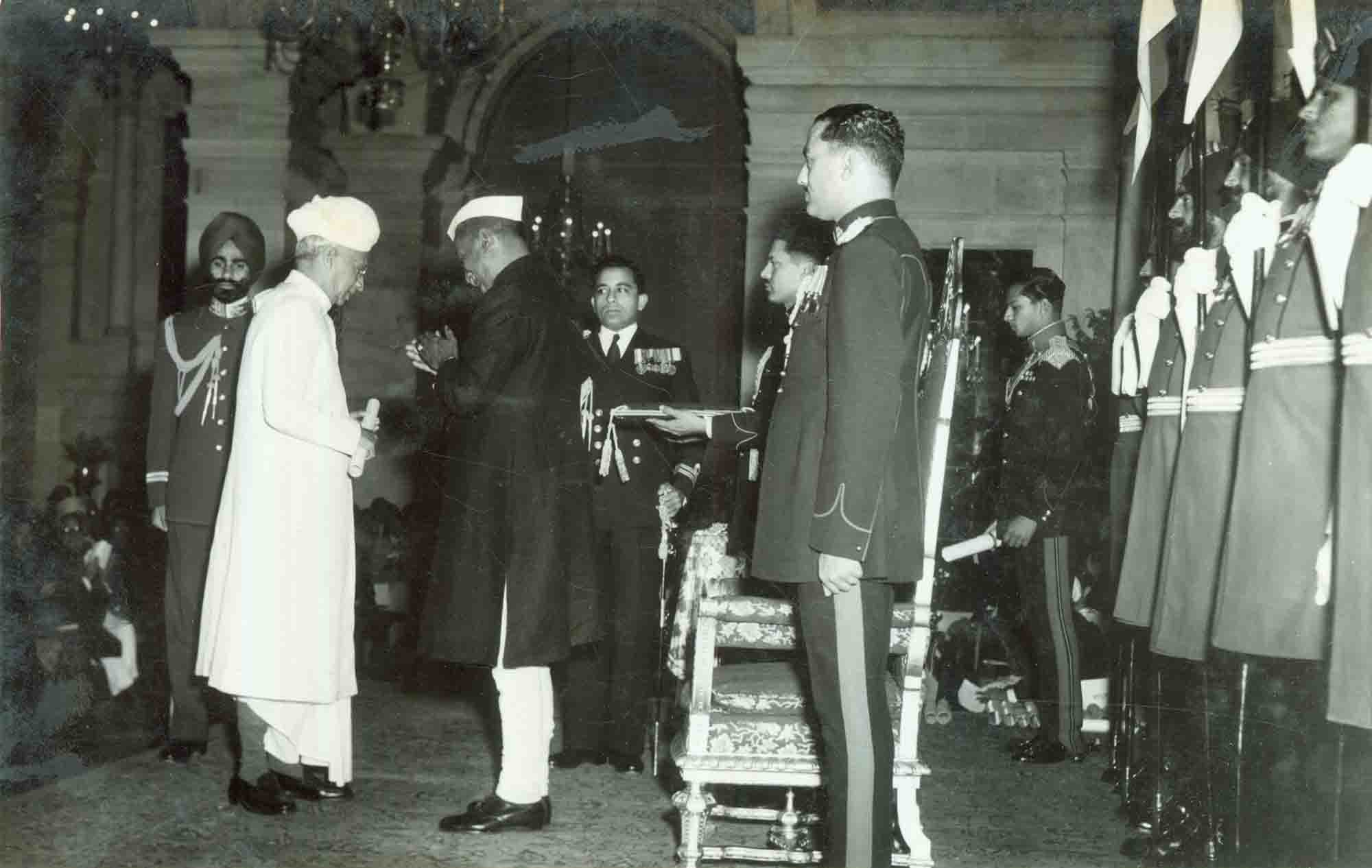
S. Radhakrishnan receiving the Bharat Ratna award from President Rajendra Prasad

=== National honours ===
- India:
  - Bharat Ratna (1954)
- British India:
  - Knight Bachelor (1931) (Note: Ceased to use the pre-nominal of Sir in 1947, following the independence of India)

=== Foreign honours ===
- Mexico:
  - Order of the Aztec Eagle, Collar (1954)
- West Germany:
  - Pour le Mérite, For Sciences and Arts (1954)
- United Kingdom:
  - Order of Merit, Honorary Member (1963)
- Finland:
  - Order of the White Rose of Finland, Grand Cross with Collar (1965)

=== Other awards ===
- A portrait of Radhakrishnan adorns the Chamber of the Rajya Sabha.
- 1938: elected Fellow of the British Academy.
- 1947: election as Permanent Member of the Institut International de Philosophie.
- 1959: Goethe Plaque of the City of Frankfurt.
- 1961: the Peace Prize of the German Book Trade.
- 1962: Institution of Teacher's Day in India, yearly celebrated on 5 September, Radhakrishnan's birthday, in honour of Radhakrishnan's belief that "teachers should be the best minds in the country".
- 1968: Sahitya Akademi Fellowship, The highest honour conferred by the Sahitya Akademi on a writer (he is the first person to get this award)
- 1975: the Templeton Prize in 1975, a few months before his death, for advocating non-aggression and conveying "a universal reality of God that embraced love and wisdom for all people." (Note: "Sir Sarvepalli Radhakrishnan was President of India from 1962 to 1967. An Oxford Professor of Eastern Religions and Ethics, he consistently advocated non-aggression in India's conflicts with neighbouring Pakistan. His accessible writings underscored his country's religious heritage and sought to convey a universal reality of God that embraced love and wisdom for all people.") He donated the entire amount of the Templeton Prize to Oxford University.
- 1989: institution of the Radhakrishnan Scholarships by Oxford University in the memory of Radhakrishnan. The scholarships were later renamed the "Radhakrishnan Chevening Scholarships".
- He was nominated sixteen times for the Nobel Prize in Literature, and eleven times for the Nobel Peace Prize.

Commemorative stamps released by India Post (by year):

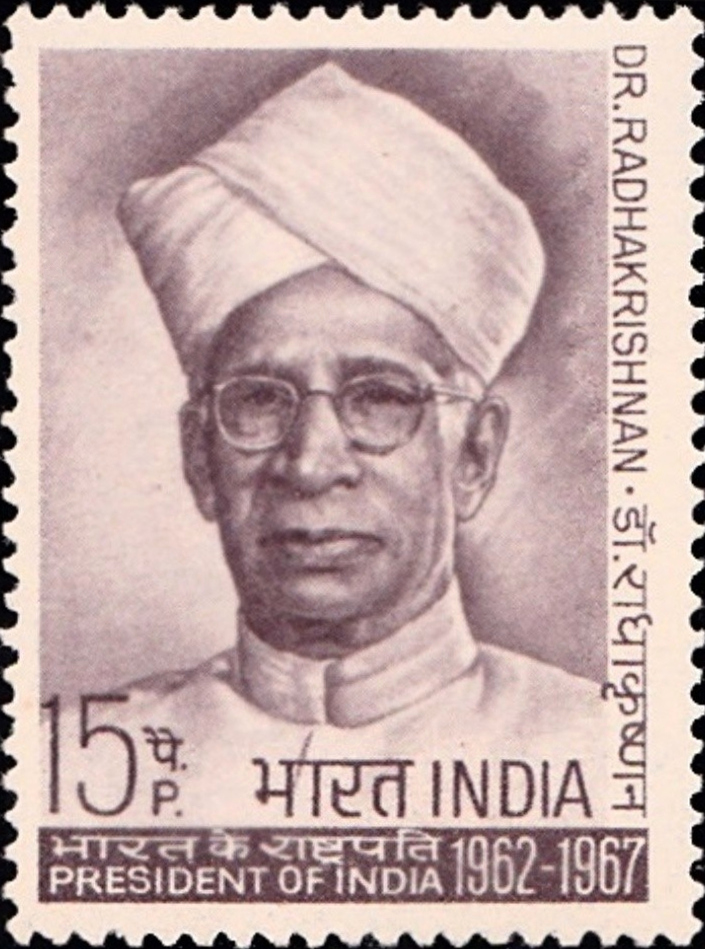
1967

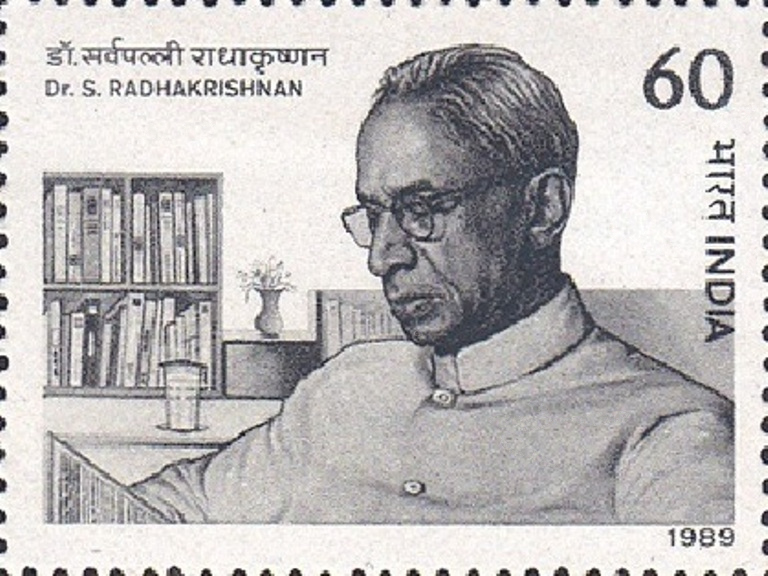
1989

== In popular culture ==
Sarvepalli Radhakrishna (1988) is a documentary film about Radhakrishnan, directed by N. S. Thapa, produced by the Government of India's Films Division.

== Quotes ==
- "It is not God that is worshipped but the authority that claims to speak in His name. Sin becomes disobedience to authority not violation of integrity."
- "Reading a book gives us the habit of solitary reflection and true enjoyment."
- "When we think we know, we cease to learn."
- "A literary genius, it is said, resembles all, though no one resembles him."
- "There is nothing wonderful in my saying that Jainism was in existence long before the Vedas were composed."
- "A life of joy and happiness is possible only on the basis of knowledge.
- "If he does not fight, it is not because he rejects all fighting as futile, but because he has finished his fights. He has overcome all dissensions between himself and the world and is now at rest... We shall have wars and soldiers so long as the brute in us is untamed."

== Works ==
=== Works by Radhakrishnan ===
- The Philosophy of Rabindranath Tagore (1918), Macmillan, London, 276 pages
- Radhakrishnan, S. (October 1922). "The Hindu Dharma". International Journal of Ethics. 33 (1). Chicago: University of Chicago Press: 1–22. doi:10.1086/intejethi.33.1.2377174. ISSN 1539-297X. JSTOR 2377174. S2CID 144844920.
- Indian Philosophy (1923) Vol. 1, 738 pages. (1927) Vol. 2, 807 pages. Oxford: Oxford University Press (1st edition).
- The Hindu View of Life (1927), London: Allen & Unwin. 92 pages
- Indian Religious Thought (2016), Orient Paperbacks, ISBN 978-81-222042-4-7
- Religion, Science and Culture (2010), Orient Paperbacks, ISBN 978-81-222001-2-6
- An Idealist View of Life (1929), 351 pages
- Kalki, or the Future of Civilization (1929), 96 pages
- Gautama the Buddha (London: Milford, 1938); 1st India ed., 1945.
- Eastern Religions and Western Thought (1939), Oxford University Press, 396 pages
- Religion and Society (1947), George Allen and Unwin Ltd., London, 242 pages
- The Bhagavadgītā: with an introductory essay, Sanskrit text, English translation and notes (1948), 388 pages
- The Dhammapada (1950), 194 pages, Oxford University Press
- The Principal Upanishads (1953), 958 pages, HarperCollins Publishers Limited
- Recovery of Faith (1956), 205 pages
- A Source Book in Indian Philosophy (1957), 683 pages, Princeton University Press, with Charles A. Moore as co-editor.
- The Brahma Sutra: The Philosophy of Spiritual Life. London: George Allen & Unwin Ltd., 1959, 606 pages.
- Religion, Science & Culture (1968), 121 pages

=== Biographies and monographs on Radhakrishnan ===
Several books have been published on Radhakrishnan:

- Murty, K. Satchidananda; Ashok Vohra (1990). Radhakrishnan: His Life and Ideas. SUNY Press. ISBN 9780791403440.
- Minor, Robert Neil (1987). Radhakrishnan: A Religious Biography. SUNY Press. ISBN 978-0-88706-554-5.
- Gopal, Sarvepalli (1989). Radhakrishnan: A Biography. Delhi: Oxford University Press. ISBN 0-19-562999-X.
- Pappu, S.S. Rama Rao (1995). New Essays in the Philosophy of Sarvepalli Radhakrishnan. Delhi: South Asia Books. ISBN 978-81-7030-461-6.
- Parthasarathi, G.; Chattopadhyaya, Debi Prasad, eds. (1989). Radhakrishnan: Centenary Volume. New Delhi: Oxford University Press.

== See also ==
- Indian philosophy – Philosophical traditions of the Indian subcontinent
- List of heads of state and government Nobel nominees
- List of Indian writers
- List of honorary professors of Moscow State University
- List of members of the Order of Merit
- List of recipients of the Pour le Mérite for Sciences and Arts
- List of commanders of the Grand Cross of the Order of the White Rose of Finland
- Postcolonialism – Study of the cultural legacy of colonialism and imperialism
- Vedanta Society – Religious organisation

== Notes ==
Academic offices
Preceded by Cattamanchi Ramalinga Reddy	Vice-Chancellor of Andhra University; 1931–1936	Succeeded by Vasireddy Sri Krishna
New title First holder	Spalding Professor of Eastern Religion and Ethics; 1936–1952	Succeeded by Robert Charles Zaehner
Preceded by Madan Mohan Malaviya	Vice-Chancellor of Banaras Hindu University; 1939–1948	Succeeded by Amarnath Jha
Diplomatic posts
Preceded by Vijaya Lakshmi Pandit	Ambassador of India to the Soviet Union; 1949–1952	Succeeded by K. P. S. Menon
Political offices
Preceded by Rajendra Prasad	President of India; 1962–1967	Succeeded by Zakir Hussain
New office	Vice President of India; 1952–1962	Succeeded by Zakir Hussain
