= Vasudha Dalmia =

Professor of Hindi and Modern South Asian Studies

- Occupation: Emerita professor

Academic background
- Education: Miranda House (B.A.); University of Cologne (M.A); Jawaharlal Nehru University (Ph.D); University of Heidelberg (PD)

Academic work
- Discipline: Hindi and Modern South Asian Studies
- Institutions: University of California; Yale University
- Notable works: Representing Hinduism (1995); The Nationalization of Hindu Traditions (1997); Charisma and Canon (2001); Hindu Pasts (2017); Fiction as History (2019); Religious Interactions in Modern India (2019)

Vasudha Dalmia is an Indian professor emerita of Hindi and Modern South Asian Studies in the Department of South and Southeast Asian Studies at the University of California, Berkeley. Her authored works include The Nationalization of Hindu Traditions: Bhāratendu Hariśchandra and Nineteenth Century Banaras (1997), the essay collection Hindu Pasts: Women, Religion, History (2017), and commentary on Hindi novels in Fiction as History: The Novel and the City in Modern North India (2019). Her edited works include Representing Hinduism: The Construction of Religious Traditions and National Identity (1995), Charisma and Canon: Essays on the Religious History of the Indian Subcontinent (2001), and Religious Interactions in Modern India (2019).

== Education ==
Dalmia completed an English Literature B.A. with Honors at Miranda House in Delhi, India and an English Literature M.A. at the University of Cologne in Cologne, Germany. Her Ph.D. in German Literature was completed at Jawaharlal Nehru University in South West Delhi in 1984, and her Habilitation in Modern Indology and Hindi Literature was completed at the University of Heidelberg in 1995.

== Career ==
From 1974 to 1979, Dalmia had teaching assignments at the University of Tuebingen, and she was a research fellow at Jawaharlal University from 1979 to 1984. She returned to the University of Tuebingen as a lecturer from 1984 until 1997. In 1998, she joined the faculty at the University of California, Berkeley. While at Berkeley, she developed the Hindi graduate program. From 2001 until her retirement in 2012, she was appointed to the Catherine and William L. Magistretti Distinguished Professorship in South and Southeast Asian Studies.

During her academic career, she was a professorial fellow in Fall 2010 at the Free University of Berlin Centre for Interweaving Performance Cultures. She received a Tagore National Fellowship in the Arts from the Ministry of Culture in India for the Fall 2012 through Spring 2013. From 2013 to 2014, she was the Chandrika and Ranjan Tandon Professor of Hindu Studies at Yale University. During the course of her academic career, Dalmia has authored, edited, and translated a range of works within her academic disciplines.

=== Representing Hinduism ===
Dalmia co-edited with Heinrich von Stietencron and contributed the essay "Practical Vedanta" to Representing Hinduism: The Construction of Religious Traditions and National Identity, a collection of essays published in 1995 by Sage Publications that followed a 1990 interdisciplinary symposium on Hindu self-perception at the University of Tubingen in Germany. In a review for the Journal of the American Oriental Society, Heidi Pauwels wrote Dalmia's contribution to the collection "unravels masterfully the complicated fabric of nineteenth-century "traditionalist" (sanātana) reconstructions of Hinduism" in her analysis of works by Bhāratendu Hariśchandra.

=== The Nationalization of Hindu Traditions ===
Dalmia also authored The Nationalization of Hindu Traditions: Bhāratendu Hariśchandra and Nineteenth Century Banaras, which was published in 1997 by Oxford University Press. In a review for The Journal of Asian Studies, Kathryn Hansen wrote the book "requires some specialist knowledge to appreciate, and historians and religious studies scholars may be more satisfied with the weight given to the various issues than a literature person like myself." Peter Gottschalk wrote in a review for History of Religions, "By focusing on the literary figure of Bharatendu Harischandra, Dalmia presents the variety of social forces contributing to the nationalization of Hindu traditions and the dynamics of the traditions involved in a more nuanced manner than many other scholars."

=== Hindu Pasts ===
Her book Hindu Pasts: Women, Religion, History, published in 2017 by SUNY Press, is a collection of her essays previously published in various publications, with an introduction of the work. In a review for the Journal of the American Academy of Religion, Emilia Bachrach discusses the attention on gender and the role of women in the collection, and states "It is in fact the author herself that shines through as the book's most notable woman," and also writes, "It is worth noting that throughout the articles - often in her framing of a historical problem - Dalmia critically analyzes (and laments) the rise of Hindu nationalism (Hindutva) in ways that significantly inform her careful unpacking of religious histories." Natalia Guzevataia writes in a review for Politics, Religion & Ideology, "Every essay in the book presents an account from colonial or, more rarely, precolonial reality, based on extensive archival work, followed by a series of questions illuminating the relations between them and the modernity. This is an invitation for the more nuanced and contextualized discussion, as opposed to the immediate call-and-response analysis."

=== Fiction as History ===
Fiction as History: The Novel and the City in Modern North India was published in 2019 by SUNY Press. The book includes an introduction and has two sections of commentary on eight Hindi novels followed by an epilogue, with the first section of commentary covering Pariksha Guru (1882) by Lala Shrinivasdas, Sevasadan (1918) and Karmabhumi (1932) by Premchand, and Jhutha Sach (1958–1960) by Yashpal, and the second section covering Gunahon Ka Devta (1949) by Dharamveer Bharati, Nadi ke Dvip (1948) by Agyeya, Sara Akash (1951) by Rajendra Yadav, and Andhere Band Kamre (1961) by Mohan Rakesh.

In a review for The Indian Economic & Social History Review, Prabhat Kumar writes, "Since the story of what the author calls modernisation (i.e., the co-constitution of North Indian cities, Hindu Hindi middle class and the articulation of a range of its cultural experience and emotion—political and sexual, public and intimate, social and individual, pragmatic and romantic and so forth) is best captured in Hindi fiction, she titles her book Fiction as History." In a review for Pacific Affairs, Chakraverti Mahajan notes the epilogue "focuses on connecting the salient dots across the novels, especially focusing on women and their negotiations with structures of power" and states, "Dalmia argues that as the novel in Hindi matures, ways of perceiving women become more complex and nuanced."

== Selected publications ==
- Dalmia V. and Heinrich von Stietencron, eds., 1995. Representing Hinduism: The Construction of Religious Traditions and National Identity. Sage Publications. ISBN 9780803991958
- Dalmia, V., 1997. The Nationalization of Hindu Traditions: Bhāratendu Hariśchandra and Nineteenth Century Banaras. Oxford University Press. ISBN 9780195639612
- Dalmia, V., Angelika Malinar, and Martin Christof, eds., 2001. Charisma and Canon: Essays on the Religious History of the Indian Subcontinent, Delhi: Oxford University Press. ISBN 9780195654530
- Dalmia, V., 2003. Orienting India: European Knowledge Formation in the Eighteenth and Nineteenth Centuries, Delhi: Three Essays. ISBN 9788188789016
- Blackburn, S.H. and Dalmia, V. eds., 2004. India's Literary History: Essays on the Nineteenth Century. Orient Blackswan. ISBN 9788178240565
- Dalmia V. and Heinrich von Stietencron, eds., 2007. The Oxford Hinduism Reader. Oxford University Press. ISBN 9780195684452
- Dalmia, V., 2008. Poetics, Plays, and Performances: The Politics of Modern Indian Theatre. Oxford University Press. ISBN 9780199087952
- Dalmia, V. and Sadana, R. eds., 2012. The Cambridge Companion to Modern Indian Culture. Cambridge University Press. ISBN 9780511979965
- The Music of Solitude, translated into English from the Hindi novel Samay Sargam by Krishna Sobti. Delhi: Harper Perennial, 2013. ISBN 9789351160229
- Dalmia, V., 2017. Hindu Pasts: Women, Religion, History. State University of New York Press. ISBN 9781438468051
- Dalmia, V., 2019. Fiction as History: The Novel and the City in Modern North India. SUNY Press. ISBN 9781438476056
- Martin Fuchs and Vasudha Dalmia, eds., 2019. Religious Interactions in Modern India. Oxford University Press. ISBN 9780198081685
