= List of members of the Order of Merit =

Below is a list of members of the Order of Merit from the order's creation in 1902 until the present day. The number shown is the individual's place in the wider order of appointment since the Order of Merit's inception.

Purple denotes the Sovereign.
Blue denotes honorary members.
Yellow denotes current members.

#	Country	Portrait	Name	Date Awarded	Lifetime	Office/Position
1.	(United Kingdom)		The Earl Roberts	26 June 1902	30 September 1832 – 14 November 1914	Military officer
2.	(United Kingdom)		The Viscount Wolseley	26 June 1902	4 June 1833 – 25 March 1913	Military officer
3.	(United Kingdom)		The Lord Kitchener of Khartoum	26 June 1902	24 June 1850 – 5 June 1916	Military officer, Colonial Administrator
4.	(United Kingdom)		The Lord Rayleigh	26 June 1902	12 November 1842 – 30 June 1919	Physicist
5.	(United Kingdom)		The Lord Kelvin	26 June 1902	26 June 1824 – 17 December 1907	Physicist
6.	(United Kingdom)		The Lord Lister	26 June 1902	5 April 1827 – 10 February 1912	Surgeon
7.	(United Kingdom)		Sir Henry Keppel	26 June 1902	14 June 1809 – 17 January 1904	Naval officer
8.	(United Kingdom)		John Morley	26 June 1902	24 December 1838 – 23 September 1923	Politician, Writer
9.	(United Kingdom)		William Edward Hartpole Lecky	26 June 1902	26 March 1838 – 22 October 1903	Historian, Politician
10.	(United Kingdom)		Sir Edward Hobart Seymour	26 June 1902	30 April 1840 – 2 March 1929	Naval officer
11.	(United Kingdom)		Sir William Huggins	26 June 1902	7 February 1824 – 12 May 1910	Astronomer
12.	(United Kingdom)		George Frederic Watts	26 June 1902	23 February 1817 – 1 July 1904	Painter
13.	(United Kingdom)		Sir George Stuart White	30 June 1905	6 July 1835 – 24 June 1912	Army officer
14.	(United Kingdom)		Sir John Fisher	30 June 1905	25 January 1841 – 10 July 1920	Naval officer
15.	(United Kingdom)		Sir Richard Claverhouse Jebb	30 June 1905	27 August 1841 – 9 December 1905	Classicist, Politician
16.	(United Kingdom)		Sir Lawrence Alma-Tadema	30 June 1905	8 January 1836 – 25 June 1912	Painter
17.	(United Kingdom)		George Meredith	30 June 1905	12 February 1828 – 18 May 1909	Novelist
18.	(United Kingdom)		William Holman Hunt	30 June 1905	2 April 1827 – 7 September 1910	Painter
19.	(Japan)		Prince Yamagata Aritomo	21 February 1906	14 June 1838 – 1 February 1922	Military officer, Statesman, Prime Minister
20.	(Japan)		Prince Ōyama Iwao	21 February 1906	12 November 1842 – 10 December 1916	Military officer
21.	(Japan)		Marquess Tōgō Heihachirō	21 February 1906	27 January 1848 – 30 May 1934	Naval officer
22.	(United Kingdom)		The Earl of Cromer	29 June 1906	26 February 1841 – 29 January 1917	Colonial Administrator
23.	(United Kingdom)		James Bryce	11 February 1907	10 May 1838 – 22 January 1922	Politician, Historian
24.	(United Kingdom)		Sir Joseph Dalton Hooker	30 June 1907	30 June 1817 – 10 December 1911	Botanist
25.	(United Kingdom)		Florence Nightingale	12 May 1907	12 May 1820 – 13 August 1910	Nurse
26.	(United Kingdom)		Henry Jackson	26 June 1908	12 March 1839 – 25 September 1921	Classicist
27.	(United Kingdom)		Alfred Russel Wallace	26 June 1908	8 January 1823 – 7 November 1913	Naturalist
28.	(United Kingdom)		Sir William Crookes	8 July 1910	17 June 1832 – 4 April 1919	Chemist
29.	(United Kingdom)		Thomas Hardy	8 July 1910	2 June 1840 – 11 January 1928	Novelist
30.	(United Kingdom)		Sir George Trevelyan, Bt	19 June 1911	20 July 1838 – 17 August 1928	Politician
31.	(United Kingdom)		Sir Edward Elgar	19 June 1911	2 June 1857 – 23 February 1934	Composer
32.	(United Kingdom)		Sir Arthur Wilson	8 March 1912	4 March 1842 – 25 May 1921	Naval officer
33.	(United Kingdom)		Sir Joseph John Thomson	15 March 1912	18 December 1856 – 30 August 1940	Physicist
34.	(United Kingdom)		Sir Archibald Geikie	1 January 1914	28 December 1835 – 10 November 1924	Geologist
35.	(United Kingdom)		Sir John French	3 December 1914	28 September 1852 – 22 May 1925	Military officer
36.	(United Kingdom)		The Viscount Haldane	26 May 1915	30 July 1856 – 19 August 1928	Politician
37.	(United Kingdom)		Henry James	1 January 1916	15 April 1843 – 28 February 1916	Novelist
38.	(United Kingdom)		Sir John Jellicoe	31 May 1916	5 December 1859 – 20 November 1935	Naval officer
39.	(United Kingdom)		Arthur Balfour	3 June 1916	25 July 1848 – 19 March 1930	Politician, Prime Minister
40.	(France)		Ferdinand Foch	29 November 1918	2 October 1851 – 20 March 1929	Military officer
41.	(United Kingdom)		Sir David Beatty	3 June 1919	17 January 1871 – 11 March 1936	Naval officer
42.	(United Kingdom)		Sir Douglas Haig	3 June 1919	19 June 1861 – 29 January 1928	Military officer
43.	(France)		Joseph Joffre	26 June 1919	12 January 1852 – 3 January 1931	Military officer
44.	(United Kingdom)		David Lloyd George	5 August 1919	17 January 1863 – 26 March 1945	Politician, Prime Minister
45.	(United Kingdom)		Sir James Matthew Barrie, Bt	2 January 1922	9 May 1860 – 19 June 1937	Novelist
46.	(United Kingdom)		F. H. Bradley	3 June 1924	30 January 1846 – 18 September 1924	Philosopher
47.	(United Kingdom)		Sir Charles Scott Sherrington	3 June 1924	27 November 1857 – 4 March 1952	Physiologist
48.	(United Kingdom)		Sir James George Frazer	1 January 1925	1 January 1854 – 7 May 1941	Sociologist
49.	(New Zealand) (United Kingdom)		Sir Ernest Rutherford	1 January 1925	30 August 1871 – 19 October 1937	Physicist
50.	(United Kingdom)		Sir Charles Algernon Parsons	3 June 1927	13 June 1854 – 11 February 1931	Engineer
51.	(United Kingdom)		Sir George Abraham Grierson	4 June 1928	7 January 1851 – 9 March 1941	Linguist
52.	(United Kingdom)		Robert Seymour Bridges	3 June 1929	23 October 1844 – 21 April 1930	Poet
53.	(United Kingdom)		John Galsworthy	3 June 1929	14 August 1867 – 31 January 1933	Novelist
54.	(Australia) (United Kingdom)		Samuel Alexander	3 June 1930	6 January 1859 – 13 September 1938	Philosopher
55.	(United Kingdom)		M. R. James	3 June 1930	1 August 1862 – 12 June 1936	Historian, Writer
56.	(United Kingdom)		G. M. Trevelyan	3 June 1930	16 February 1876 – 21 July 1962	Historian
57.	(United Kingdom)		Sir Charles Madden, Bt	1 January 1931	5 September 1862 – 5 June 1935	Naval officer
58.	(United Kingdom)		Philip Wilson Steer	1 January 1931	28 December 1860 – 18 March 1942	Painter
59.	(United Kingdom)		Sir William Henry Bragg	3 June 1931	2 July 1862 – 10 March 1942	Physicist
60.	(United Kingdom)		John William Mackail	1 January 1935	26 August 1859 – 13 December 1945	Classicist
61.	(United Kingdom)		John Masefield	3 June 1935	1 June 1878 – 12 May 1967	Poet
62.	(United Kingdom)		Ralph Vaughan Williams	3 June 1935	12 October 1872 – 26 August 1958	Composer
63.	(United Kingdom)		Sir Frederick Gowland Hopkins	3 June 1935	20 June 1861 – 16 May 1947	Biochemist
64.	(United Kingdom)		Sir Philip Chetwode, Bt	1 January 1936	21 September 1869 – 6 July 1950	Military officer
65.	(United Kingdom)		Herbert Fisher	1 February 1937	21 March 1865 – 18 April 1940	Historian, Politician
66.	(United Kingdom)		The Lord Baden-Powell	11 May 1937	22 February 1857 – 8 January 1941	Military officer, Scouting pioneer
67.	(United Kingdom)		Sir Arthur Eddington	9 June 1938	28 December 1882 – 22 November 1944	Astronomer
68.	(United Kingdom)		The Lord Chatfield	2 January 1939	27 September 1873 – 15 November 1967	Naval officer, Statesman
69.	(United Kingdom)		Sir James Hopwood Jeans	2 January 1939	11 September 1877 – 16 September 1946	Physicist
70.	(United Kingdom)		Sir Cyril Newall	29 October 1940	15 February 1886 – 30 November 1963	Air force officer
71.	(Australia) (United Kingdom)		Gilbert Murray	1 January 1941	2 January 1866 – 20 May 1957	Classicist
72.	(United Kingdom)		Sir Edwin Lutyens	1 January 1942	29 March 1869 – 1 January 1944	Architect
73.	(United Kingdom)		Augustus John	11 June 1942	4 January 1878 – 31 October 1961	Painter
74.	(United Kingdom)		Edgar Adrian	11 June 1942	30 November 1889 – 4 August 1977	Physiologist
75.	(United Kingdom)		Sir William Searle Holdsworth	1 January 1943	7 May 1871 – 2 January 1944	Legal Scholar
76.	(United Kingdom)		Sir Dudley Pound	3 September 1943	29 August 1877 – 21 October 1943	Naval officer
77.	(United Kingdom)		The Lord Passfield	8 June 1944	13 July 1859 – 13 October 1947	Economist, Politician
78.	(United Kingdom)		Sir Henry Hallett Dale	8 June 1944	9 June 1875 – 23 July 1968	Pharmacologist
79.	(United Kingdom)		Sir Giles Gilbert Scott	8 June 1944	9 November 1880 – 8 February 1960	Architect
80.	(United Kingdom) (United States)		Alfred North Whitehead	1 January 1945	15 February 1861 – 30 December 1947	Mathematician, Philosopher
81.	(United States)		Dwight D. Eisenhower	12 June 1945	14 October 1890 – 28 March 1969	Military officer, Statesman, President
82.	(United Kingdom)		Winston Churchill	1 January 1946	30 November 1874 – 24 January 1965	Politician, Prime Minister
83.	(United Kingdom)		The Viscount Portal of Hungerford	1 January 1946	21 May 1893 – 22 April 1971	Air force officer
84.	(United Kingdom)		The Viscount Alanbrooke	13 June 1946	23 July 1883 – 17 June 1963	Military officer
85.	(United Kingdom)		The Viscount Cunningham of Hyndhope	13 June 1946	7 January 1883 – 12 June 1963	Naval officer
86.	(United Kingdom)		The Earl of Halifax	13 June 1946	16 April 1881 – 23 December 1959	Politician
87.	(South Africa)		Jan Smuts	1 January 1947	24 May 1870 – 11 September 1950	Politician, Military officer, Prime Minister
88.	(United States)		John Gilbert Winant	1 January 1947	23 February 1889 – 3 November 1947	Politician, Diplomat
89.	(Canada)		William Lyon Mackenzie King	17 November 1947	17 December 1874 – 22 July 1950	Politician, Prime Minister
90.	(United Kingdom)		T. S. Eliot	1 January 1948	26 September 1888 – 4 January 1965	Poet
91.	(United Kingdom)		Sir Robert Robinson	9 June 1949	13 September 1886 – 8 February 1975	Chemist
92.	(United Kingdom)		The Earl Russell	9 June 1949	18 May 1872 – 2 February 1970	Philosopher, Mathematician
93.	(United Kingdom)		Sir Alexander Cadogan	1 January 1951	25 November 1884 – 9 July 1968	Civil Servant
94.	(United Kingdom)		The Viscount Trenchard	1 January 1951	3 February 1873 – 10 February 1956	Air force officer and 'Father of the RAF'
95.	(United Kingdom)		G. E. Moore	7 June 1951	4 November 1873 – 24 October 1958	Philosopher
96.	(United Kingdom)		Clement Attlee	5 November 1951	3 January 1883 – 8 October 1967	Politician, Prime Minister
97.	(Canada)		Wilder Penfield	1 January 1953	26 January 1891 – 5 April 1976	Surgeon
98.	(United Kingdom)		Walter de la Mare	1 June 1953	25 April 1873 – 22 June 1956	Writer
99.	(France)		Albert Schweitzer	25 February 1955	14 January 1875 – 4 September 1965	Physician, Missionary, Theologian
100.	(United Kingdom)		The Lord Hailey	31 May 1956	15 February 1872 – 1 June 1969	Colonial Administrator
101.	(United Kingdom)		Sir John Cockcroft	1 January 1957	27 May 1897 – 18 September 1967	Physicist
102.	(United Kingdom)		The Viscount Waverley	8 December 1957	8 July 1882 – 4 January 1958	Civil Servant, Statesman
103.	(Australia)		Sir Frank Macfarlane Burnet	12 June 1958	3 September 1899 – 31 August 1985	Physiologist
104.	(United Kingdom)		The Viscount Samuel	21 November 1958	6 November 1870 – 2 February 1963	Politician
105.	(United Kingdom)		The Earl Alexander of Tunis	23 April 1960	10 December 1891 – 16 June 1969	Military officer
106.	(United Kingdom)		Sir Cyril Norman Hinshelwood	23 April 1960	19 June 1897 – 9 October 1967	Chemist
107.	(United Kingdom)		Graham Sutherland	23 April 1960	24 August 1903 – 17 February 1980	Artist
108.	(United Kingdom)		Sir Geoffrey de Havilland	23 November 1962	27 July 1882 – 21 May 1965	Aircraft Engineer
109.	(United Kingdom)		Sir Basil Spence	23 November 1962	13 August 1907 – 19 November 1976	Architect
110.	(Australia)		Sir Owen Dixon	29 May 1963	28 April 1886 – 7 July 1972	Judge
111.	(India)		Sir Sarvepalli Radhakrishnan	12 June 1963	5 September 1888 – 17 April 1975	Statesman, Philosopher, President
112.	(United Kingdom)		George Peabody Gooch	16 August 1963	21 October 1873 – 31 August 1968	Historian, Politician
113.	(United Kingdom)		Henry Moore	16 August 1963	30 July 1898 – 31 August 1986	Sculptor
114.	(United Kingdom)		Benjamin Britten	23 March 1965	22 November 1913 – 4 December 1976	Composer
115.	(United Kingdom)		Dorothy Hodgkin	23 March 1965	12 May 1910 – 29 July 1994	Biochemist
116.	(United Kingdom)		The Earl Mountbatten of Burma	15 July 1965	25 June 1900 – 27 August 1979	Naval officer, Statesman
117.	(Australia) (United Kingdom)		The Lord Florey	15 July 1965	24 September 1898 – 21 February 1968	Pharmacologist
118.	(United Kingdom)		Patrick Blackett	20 November 1967	18 November 1897 – 13 July 1974	Physicist
119.	(United Kingdom)		Sir William Walton	20 November 1967	29 March 1902 – 8 March 1983	Composer
120.	(United Kingdom)		Ben Nicholson	23 April 1968	10 April 1894 – 6 February 1982	Painter
121.	(South Africa) (United Kingdom)		Sir Solly Zuckerman	23 April 1968	30 May 1904 – 1 April 1993	Zoologist
122.			The Duke of Edinburgh	10 June 1968	10 June 1921 – 9 April 2021	Prince, Spouse of Queen Elizabeth II
123.	(United Kingdom)		E. M. Forster	1 January 1969	1 January 1879 – 7 June 1970	Novelist
124.	(United Kingdom)		Malcolm MacDonald	14 July 1969	17 August 1901 – 11 January 1981	Politician
125.	(United Kingdom)		The Lord Penney	14 July 1969	24 June 1909 – 3 March 1991	Mathematician
126.	(United Kingdom)		Sir Geoffrey Ingram Taylor	14 July 1969	7 March 1886 – 27 June 1975	Physicist
127.	(United Kingdom)		Dame Veronica Wedgwood	14 July 1969	20 July 1910 – 9 March 1997	Historian
128.	(New Zealand)		John Beaglehole	21 March 1970	13 June 1901 – 10 October 1971	Historian
129.	(Canada)		Lester B. Pearson	20 May 1971	23 April 1897 – 27 December 1972	Politician, Prime Minister
130.	(United Kingdom)		Sir Isaiah Berlin	20 May 1971	6 June 1909 – 5 November 1997	Philosopher, Historian
131.	(United Kingdom)		Sir George Edwards	20 May 1971	9 July 1908 – 2 March 2003	Aircraft Engineer
132.	(United Kingdom)		Sir Alan Lloyd Hodgkin	17 April 1973	5 February 1914 – 20 December 1998	Physiologist
133.	(United Kingdom)		Paul Dirac	17 April 1973	8 August 1902 – 20 October 1984	Physicist
134.	(United Kingdom)		Harold Macmillan	2 April 1976	10 February 1894 – 29 December 1986	Politician, Prime Minister
135.	(United Kingdom)		The Lord Hinton of Bankside	2 April 1976	12 May 1901 – 22 June 1983	Engineer
136.	(United Kingdom)		The Lord Clark	2 April 1976	13 July 1903 – 21 May 1983	Art Historian, Broadcaster
137.	(New Zealand) (United Kingdom)		Sir Ronald Syme	2 April 1976	11 March 1903 – 4 September 1989	Historian
138.	(United Kingdom)		The Lord Todd	24 October 1977	2 October 1907 – 10 January 1997	Biochemist
139.	(United Kingdom)		The Lord Franks	24 October 1977	16 February 1905 – 15 October 1992	Civil Servant, Diplomat
140.	(United Kingdom)		Sir Frederick Ashton	24 October 1977	17 September 1904 – 18 October 1988	Ballet Dancer
141.	(United Kingdom)		J. B. Priestley	24 October 1977	13 September 1894 – 14 August 1984	Playwright, Novelist
142.	(United Kingdom)		The Lord Olivier	6 February 1981	22 May 1907 – 11 July 1989	Actor
143.	(United Kingdom)		Sir Peter Medawar	6 February 1981	28 February 1915 – 2 October 1987	Biologist
144.	(United Kingdom)		Leonard Cheshire	6 February 1981	7 September 1917 – 31 July 1992	Soldier, Philanthropist
145.	(United Kingdom)		The Reverend Owen Chadwick	11 November 1983	20 May 1916 – 17 July 2015	Priest, Historian
146.	(United Kingdom)		Sir Andrew Huxley	11 November 1983	22 November 1917 – 30 May 2012	Physiologist
147.	(Australia)		Sir Sidney Nolan	11 November 1983	22 April 1917 – 28 November 1992	Painter
148.	(United Kingdom)		Sir Michael Tippett	11 November 1983	2 January 1905 – 8 January 1998	Composer
149.	(Albania) (India)		Agnesë Gonxhe Bojaxhiu (Mother Teresa)	18 November 1983	26 August 1910 – 5 September 1997	Nun, Missionary
150.	(United Kingdom)		Graham Greene	11 February 1986	2 October 1904 – 3 April 1991	Novelist
151.	(United Kingdom)		Frederick Sanger	11 February 1986	13 August 1918 – 19 November 2013	Biochemist
152.	(United Kingdom)		Sir Frank Whittle	11 February 1986	1 June 1907 – 9 August 1996	Aircraft Engineer
153.	(United Kingdom)		Sir Yehudi Menuhin	25 February 1987	22 April 1916 – 12 March 1999	Violinist
154.	(United Kingdom)		Sir Ernst Gombrich	15 February 1988	30 March 1909 – 3 November 2001	Art Historian
155.	(United Kingdom)		Max Perutz	15 February 1988	19 May 1914 – 6 February 2002	Biologist
156.	(United Kingdom)		Dame Cicely Saunders	30 November 1989	22 June 1918 – 14 July 2005	Nurse, Social Worker
157.	(United Kingdom)		Sir George Porter	30 November 1989	6 December 1920 – 31 August 2002	Chemist
158.	(United Kingdom)		Margaret Thatcher	9 December 1990	13 October 1925 – 8 April 2013	Politician, Prime Minister
159.	(Australia)		Dame Joan Sutherland	29 November 1991	7 November 1926 – 10 October 2010	Soprano
160.	(United Kingdom)		Francis Crick	27 November 1991	8 June 1916 – 28 July 2004	Biologist
161.	(United Kingdom)		Dame Ninette de Valois	17 November 1992	6 June 1898 – 8 March 2001	Ballet Dancer
162.	(United Kingdom)		Sir Michael Atiyah	17 November 1992	22 April 1929 – 11 January 2019	Mathematician
163.	(United Kingdom)		Lucian Freud	6 December 1993	8 December 1922 – 20 July 2011	Painter
164.	(United Kingdom)		Roy Jenkins	6 December 1993	11 November 1920 – 5 January 2003	Politician
165.	(South Africa)		Nelson Mandela	21 March 1995	18 July 1918 – 5 December 2013	Statesman, President
166.	(United Kingdom)		Sir Aaron Klug	23 October 1995	11 August 1926 – 20 November 2018	Chemist
167.	(United Kingdom)		Sir John Gielgud	9 December 1996	14 April 1904 – 21 May 2000	Actor
168.	(United Kingdom)		The Lord Denning	25 November 1997	23 January 1899 – 5 March 1999	Judge
169.	(United Kingdom)		Sir Norman Foster	25 November 1997	1 June 1935 –	Architect
170.	(United Kingdom)		Sir Denis Rooke	25 November 1997	2 April 1924 – 2 September 2008	Engineer
171.	(United Kingdom)		Ted Hughes	10 August 1998	17 August 1930 – 28 October 1998	Poet, Writer
172.	(United Kingdom)		Basil Hume	25 May 1999	2 March 1923 – 17 June 1999	Archbishop, Cardinal
173.	(United Kingdom)		Sir James Whyte Black	9 May 2000	14 June 1924 – 22 March 2010	Pharmacologist
174.	(United Kingdom)		Sir Anthony Caro	9 May 2000	8 March 1924 – 23 October 2013	Sculptor
175.	(United Kingdom)		Sir Roger Penrose	9 May 2000	8 August 1931 –	Mathematician
176.	(United Kingdom)		Sir Tom Stoppard	9 May 2000	3 July 1937 – 29 November 2025	Playwright
177.			King Charles III	27 June 2002	14 November 1948 –	King
178.	(Australia)		The Lord May of Oxford	28 October 2002	8 January 1936 – 28 April 2020	Ecologist
179.	(United Kingdom)		The Lord Rothschild	28 October 2002	29 April 1936 – 26 February 2024	Banker, Philanthropist
180.	(United Kingdom)		Sir David Attenborough	10 June 2005	8 May 1926 –	Broadcaster, Naturalist
181.	(United Kingdom)		The Baroness Boothroyd	10 June 2005	8 October 1929 – 26 February 2023	Politician, Speaker
182.	(United Kingdom)		Sir Michael Howard	10 June 2005	29 November 1922 – 30 November 2019	Historian
183.	(United Kingdom)		The Lord Eames	13 June 2007	27 April 1937 –	Archbishop
184.	(United Kingdom)		Sir Tim Berners-Lee	13 June 2007	8 June 1955 –	Computer Scientist
185.	(United Kingdom)		The Lord Rees of Ludlow	13 June 2007	23 June 1942 –	Astronomer
186.	(Canada)		Jean Chrétien	13 July 2009	11 January 1934 –	Politician, Prime Minister
187.	(United Kingdom)		Neil MacGregor	4 November 2010	16 June 1946 –	Art Historian
188.	(United Kingdom)		David Hockney	1 January 2012	9 July 1937 – 11 June 2026	Painter
189.	(Australia)		John Howard	1 January 2012	26 July 1939 –	Politician, Prime Minister
190.	(United Kingdom)		Sir Simon Rattle	1 January 2014	19 January 1955 –	Conductor
191.	(United Kingdom)		Martin Litchfield West	1 January 2014	23 September 1937 – 13 July 2015	Classicist
192.	(Egypt) (United Kingdom)		Sir Magdi Yacoub	1 January 2014	16 November 1935 –	Surgeon
193.	(United Kingdom)		The Lord Darzi of Denham	31 December 2015	7 May 1960 –	Surgeon
194.	(United Kingdom)		Dame Ann Dowling	31 December 2015	15 July 1952 –	Engineer
195.	(United Kingdom)		Sir James Dyson	31 December 2015	2 May 1947 –	Industrial Designer
196.	(United Kingdom)		Dame Elizabeth Anionwu	11 November 2022	2 July 1947 –	Nurse
197.	(Trinidad and Tobago) (United Kingdom)		The Baroness Benjamin	11 November 2022	23 September 1949 –	Broadcaster
198.	(Canada)		Margaret MacMillan	11 November 2022	23 December 1943 –	Historian
199.	(Ghana) (United Kingdom)		Sir David Adjaye	11 November 2022	22 September 1966 –	Architect
200.	(United Kingdom)		Sir Paul Nurse	11 November 2022	25 January 1949 –	Geneticist and Nobel Laureate
201.	(United States) (United Kingdom)		Venki Ramakrishnan	11 November 2022	1 April 1952 –	Structural biologist and Nobel Laureate
