= Desh Ka Bhavishya =

- Author: Yashpal
- Language: Hindi
- Genre: Novel
- Publisher: Lokbharti Prakashan (Rajkamal Prakashan) (India)
- Publication date: 1960
- Publication place: India
- Dewey Decimal: 891.433
- Preceded by: Vatan Aur Desh

Desh Ka Bhavishya is the second and the final volume of Yashpal's Jhutha Sach. It is based on the events surrounding the Partition of India. It was originally published in 1960 in India.
