= Dada Kamred =

1941 novel by Yashpal

- Author: Yashpal
- Language: Hindi
- Genre: Novel
- Published: Lokbharti Prakashan (Rajkamal Prakashan) (India), 1941
- Publication place: India
- Media type: Print (hardback & paperback)
- Pages: 136
- ISBN: 9788180313721
- Dewey Decimal: 891.433

Dada Kamred (Hindi: दादा कॉमरेड) is the debut novel written by Yashpal.
