= Meri Teri Uski Baat =

1974 novel by Yashpal

- 2001 edition
- Author: Yashpal
- Language: Hindi
- Genre: Novel
- Published: Lokbharti Prakashan (Rajkamal Prakashan) (India), 1974
- Publication place: India
- Media type: Print (hardback & paperback)
- Pages: 568
- Awards: Sahitya Akademi Award, 1976
- ISBN: 9788180313592

Meri Teri Uski Baat (Hindi: मेरी तेरी उसकी बात) is a novel written by Yashpal. This novel is based on the history of Indian independence movement. This novel won the Hindi-language Sahitya Akademi Award in 1976.
