= Vatan Aur Desh =

1958 novel by Yashpal

- Author: Yashpal
- Language: Hindi
- Publisher: Lokbharti Prakashan (Rajkamal Prakashan) (India)
- Publication date: 1958
- Publication place: India
- ISBN: 978-8-180-31065-2
- Dewey Decimal: 891.433
- Followed by: Desh Ka Bhavishya

Vatan Aur Desh is the first of the two volumes of the novel Jhutha Sach by the author Yashpal. It is based on the events surrounding the Partition of India. It was originally published in 1958 in India. In this novel, he has beautifully portrayed the conflict to simplistic terms of class warfare. The scope and realism of this novel has resulted in its favorable comparison with Leo Tolstoy's War and Peace.
