= Bareilly Central Jail =

Prison center in Bareilly, India

Bareilly Central Jail was built in 1848 at Bareilly in Uttar Pradesh, India, at a time when the authorities of the British East India Company were introducing a policy of constructing central prisons to house those convicted for long terms.

== History ==
The prisons were located in proximity to military bases so that soldiers could be called upon to quell any violence within them. This policy arose from a two-year enquiry that had begun in 1836 and included Macaulay among its members. As another strand of the policy, these new prisons were governed by police inspectors rather than, as previously, being under the control of district collectors. It was deemed that the collectors' many and varied other responsibilities caused them to have little time to oversee matters relating to the prison system, but in due course, it was also found that the police officers were similarly affected, and thus, dedicated prison superintendents were introduced.

The change in responsibility caused members of the Indian Medical Service to take over from those of the Indian Civil Service and reflected the enquiry's concern regarding prison conditions, which it had considered to be chaotic, arbitrary, unsanitary and disease-ridden and the cause of high death rates. Despite these progressive conclusions, which also created a two-tier designation of "simple imprisonment" and "rigorous imprisonment", the principal purpose of the central prisons remained that of punishment rather than rehabilitation, with prisoners kept occupied in the performance of dull, repetitive tasks and with no provision for education or reward for good behaviour.

An outbreak of anthrax in December 1905 among people working with wool at the jail caused seven deaths.

Bareilly Central Jail housed various political prisoners during the British Raj era, including Yashpal, whose marriage on 7 August 1936 while imprisoned there was the first such ceremony in an Indian jail. The perceived humanising touch to the strictures of imprisonment led to a change in prison manuals, effectively preventing any further such events.

An early study of homosexuality among male prisoners in India, published by S. P. Srivastava in 1974, indicated that 10–15 percent of inmates at Bareilly were situational and habitual homosexuals and 3 per cent were "committed" thus.

== Notable prisoners ==
- Ghaffar Khan (ca. 1935)
- Jawaharlal Nehru (February - June 1932, March–June 1945)
- M. N. Roy (ca. 1932)
- Chandra Shekhar (ca. 1954)
- Yashpal (ca. 1936)
