= Yashpal =

Hindi writer (1903–1976)

Yashpal Singh
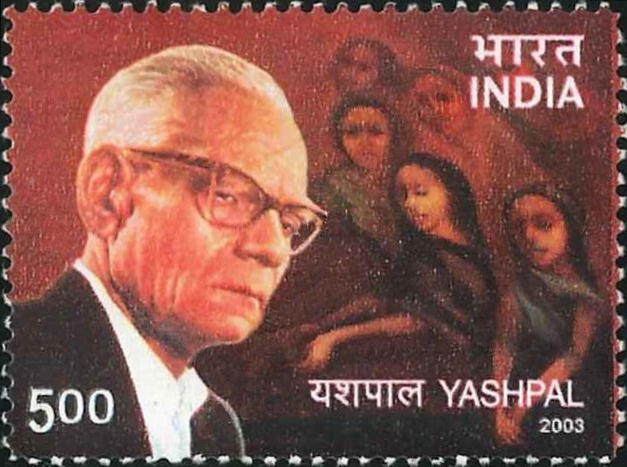
- Yashpal Singh on a 2003 stamp of India
- Born: 3 December 1903; Kangra Hills, British India
- Died: 26 December 1976 (aged 73)
- Citizenship: India
- Occupation: Author
- Spouse: Prakashwati
- Writing career
- Language: Hindi
- Notable works: Jhutha Sach; Meri Teri Uski Baat; Pinjre ki Uran
- Notable awards: Padma Bhushan; 1970; Sahitya Akademi Award; 1976

Yashpal Singh (3 December 1903 – 26 December 1976) was a Hindi-language writer, political commentator, a socialist and an essayist. He wrote in a range of genres, including essays, novels and short stories, as well as a play, two travel books and an autobiography. He won the Hindi-language Sahitya Akademi Award for his novel Meri Teri Uski Baat in 1976 and was also a recipient of the Padma Bhushan.

== Early life and activism ==
Yashpal was born on 3 December 1903 in the village of Bhumpal, (present-day Hamirpur district) situated within the Kangra Hills in British India. His mother was poor and had sole responsibility for raising her two sons. He grew up in an era when the popularity of the Indian independence movement was steadily increasing and with a mother who was a keen supporter of Arya Samaj. He attended an Arya Samaj gurukul in Haridwar on a "freeship" basis, due to the family's poverty. (Note: The "freeship" included free food and clothing, as well as tuition.) Such gurukuls were considered by the colonial administration to be "hotbeds of sedition" because they fostered pride in Hindu culture and Indian achievements, encouraging the notion that British rule was a "temporary setback or punishment for having permitted laxity in the Aryan religion." Yashpal later said that during his schooldays he had daydreamed of a time when Indians would reverse the current situation to the point of ruling the British in England. He was bullied by his fellow pupils at the gurukul on account of his poverty, and he left the school when he suffered a prolonged attack of dysentery.

Reunited with his mother in Lahore, Yashpal attended middle school there before progressing to high school in Ferozepur Cantonment, where the family had subsequently moved. He found the urban environment and schooling to be more to his taste and he finished first in class in his matriculation exam.

Yashpal had been a follower of Mahatma Gandhi's Congress organisation from the age of 17, while still in high school. He toured villages to promote Gandhi's message of non-cooperation among peasant people but they appeared disinterested and he realised that there was nothing in the Congress programme that addressed issues that affected them. It was after one such tour that he received his matriculation results, the success in which entitled him to a scholarship at a government college. He declined that award in favour of having to fund himself through studies at National College, Lahore, an institution that had been established by the Arya Samajist and Congress activist Lala Lajpat Rai with the aim of promoting social service and providing a quality education to Indians who did not want to be taught in British-administered colleges.

== Hindustan Socialist Republican Association ==
It was at National College that Yashpal met people such as Bhagat Singh and Sukhdev Thapar who were later to become the nucleus of the Punjabi armed revolution movement. Encouraged by the tutelage of Jaichandra Vidyalankar, a historian and associate of Ghadarites, this group of students read widely of political theory and past revolutionaries from Europe and India. The Hindustan Republican Association became known as the Hindustan Socialist Republican Association (HSRA) in 1928, with the change of name probably being largely due to the influence of Bhagat Singh, who was a prominent figure in it. Sharing Singh's disillusionment with the impact of Gandhi's non-cooperation strategy, Yashpal joined with it. His work for the HSRA was generally behind the scenes and he had a lower public profile than people who physically engaged in acts of revolution, such as Singh, Rajguru and Chandrashekar Azad. While continuing his activism, he was employed as a clerk by the Lakshmi Insurance Company, a role that he deeply disliked and described

Before this, no one had ever been dissatisfied with me; in fact, I was always praised for my hard work and ability. But I proved to be totally incompetent as a clerk. Personally, I found the work so distasteful I could not apply myself to it. I made one mistake after another and was constantly criticized. Where were my lofty aspirations to be a successful lawyer or professor or effective political figure, sitting all day on my clerk's seat, sending interim receipts and writing dunning letters to clients to pay up their overdue premiums? ... I felt like I was sealed up inside a box, helpless, unable to break out. I felt that this was not my individual misfortune, but the lack of opportunity because of the way our society was managed. I felt that a change in the way the country and society were run was the only remedy. Then I saw the revolution, not only as a beneficence, but as a cry for my very existence.

Yashpal became a fugitive in April 1929, hiding for a few weeks with a relative (Pandit Shyama) in the Kangra area (village Samhoon near Rail in Hamirpur) after a recently established HSRA bomb factory in Lahore was raided by police. Realizing that the HSRA cause could not be furthered unless its members were organised, he was back in Lahore before June. Bhagat Singh and Sukhdev Thapar had both been arrested and he did not have contact details for any members who were free. Sukhdev Thapar was able to give him details of another member after Yashpal visited him in prison, posing as a lawyer, but the information was voided soon after due to a police raid on the HSRA's other bomb factory, in Saharanpur. Some of those arrested at both factories became informants.

Yashpal then held discussions with leaders of the Hindu Mahasabha. However, he differed from them ideologically. Their offer to pay the HSRA 50,000 rupees to assassinate Muhammad Ali Jinnah was the final straw: the organisation of which he was a member were not to be guns for hire.

The last significant armed act of the HSRA was the attempt on 23 December 1929 to blow up a train carrying the then viceroy, Lord Irwin. Yashpal detonated that bomb, which destroyed the dining car but only inconvenienced Irwin. (Note: Irwin was travelling on that day to meet with Gandhi. The meeting went ahead as arranged and soon after it Gandhi published an article, The Cult of the Bomb, that criticised the methods used by HSRA. Yashpal responded to the criticism by writing The Philosophy of the Bomb, which the HSRA published.) With several of its leaders imprisoned, some of whom were subsequently executed, Chandrashekar Azad reorganised the HSRA in 1930. Yashpal was appointed to the central committee and became organiser in Punjab. It was around this time that he met his future wife, Prakashvati Kapur, through his HSRA work. That relationship caused much jealousy and also concern among other HSRA members: the 17-year-old Prakashvati was considered too young to be involved with the group, although already paying a subscription, and was perceived as being vulnerable. There were also concerns about his commitment to the cause, since people thought that the life of a revolutionary was not compatible with marriage and HSRA members had taken a vow of celibacy. The outcome was dramatic: Yashpal found out that some of his colleagues were plotting to kill him for being a double agent of the British under orders from Azad, and the HSRA was beset with internal divisions regarding those concerns and also accusations that Yashpal might turn informant, His information came from the would-be assassin, a member of the HSRA who was acting as an informer for the British authorities. In September 1930, despite his personal acceptance of Yashpal's false integrity and honour, Azad felt it necessary to disband the fractured movement, distributing its weapons among the membership and telling them to go fight for the revolutionary cause on a decentralised, provincial basis rather than under direction from the committee.

While making various abortive attempts to visit Russia in order to investigate the outcomes of the revolution there, Yashpal continued to work with Azad until the latter died in February 1931 during a shoot-out with police in Allahabad. He tried then to reunite the HSRA and was eventually successful, being elected commander-in-chief in January 1932 and putting his name to a seditious handbill that was distributed. He was arrested by the British in Allahabad on 22 January 1932. (Note: Yashpal did eventually manage trips to the Soviet Union, in 1952 and 1958.) Defended by a member of the Nehru family, Shyam Kumari Nehru, Yashpal tried to claim the status of a political prisoner, which might improve the conditions of his confinement. He received a 14-year sentence of rigorous imprisonment, seven of those being on the charge of attempted murder in Cawnpore and a further seven for attempting to kill a police officer in a shoot-out that had occurred a day after his arrival in Allahabad. Nehru told him that the judge had originally intended these sentences to run concurrently but had changed his decision to consecutive during a delay in finalising the paperwork. The change could have been significant because a fourteen-year sentence was de facto equivalent to one of life imprisonment: government review and permission for release was required once the sentence was complete. As events turned out, and after facing further charges in May 1932, resulting from the deliberations of the Delhi Conspiracy Commission and later abandoned, Yashpal served six years before being among those released under an amnesty agreement for political prisoners that was brokered by the newly formed Congress government in the United Provinces. As far as Congress were concerned, there was no difference in status between people who had been imprisoned for non-cooperation (the satyagrahis) and those serving sentences for revolutionary activities. His release came on 2 March 1938, without any requirement for him to renounce his past activities.

Despite his own misgivings concerning his future prospects, given his criminal history and increasingly poor health while in jail, Prakashvati had determined to marry him and did so at her insistence. The ceremony took place at Bareilly Central Jail on 7 August 1936 and was the first marriage to be conducted in an Indian jail. It caused a furore, being considered an unwarranted humanisation of the strictures of imprisonment. Prison manuals were amended to prevent a recurrence.

== Writing ==
It was after Yashpal's release from prison that he began to write, seeing literature as a vehicle for righting the wrongs that he perceived to exist in Indian society. Marxism became his preferred ideology; he saw the Communist Party of India as the successor to the HSRA, although he joined neither that nor any other political party.

Yashpal had been banned from entering Punjab following his release from prison and so settled with his wife in Lucknow. His first work, Pinjre ki Uran (Flight from the Cage) (1939), was a notable success. He worked briefly for Karmayogi, a Hindi-language magazine, before establishing his own magazine, Viplav (Cataclysm), which was published in Hindi and Urdu until its closure in 1941. The closure became necessary because the government, which considered Viplav to be seditious, demanded a 13,000 rupee security; the magazine was restarted after India gained independence in 1947. In 1941, he established a publishing house called Viplava Karyalaya and, in 1944, a printing press called Sathi Press.

Yashpal's next books – Dada Kamred (Comrade, The Big Brother) (1941) and Deshdrohi (Traitor) (1943) – were both fictional works that had the Communist Party as a central theme. Other essays, novels, and short stories were published between that time and Indian independence, and these added to the impression that he was an agitator. That impression caused his arrest in 1949 and jailing by order of the Government of Uttar Pradesh, which was at that time arresting people with communist sympathies due to an illegal railway strike that had Communist Party support. A public outcry at his arrest ensued and the government had to back down in a humiliating manner, although they did succeed in banning him from Lucknow for a period of six months and thus caused the final closure of Viplav.

His autobiography, Sinhavalokan (A Lion's Eye-View or A Backward Glance), was published in three volumes between 1951–55 and is recognized for its detailed account of the armed struggle for independence in India as well as for information on his own early life. He was writing a fourth volume of this autobiography at the time of his death on 26 December 1976.

Yashpal was awarded the Padma Bhushan in 1970.

== Literary criticism ==
Yogendra Malik notes that as a Marxist novelist, Yashpal formed a part of

one of the most important literary groups in Hindi dedicated to an ideological interpretation of politics. Committed to the concepts of "socialist realism" and "purposeful art", these writers analyse the social and political structures in India on the basis of Marxism and Leninism. Through their fictional heroes they propagate ideological precepts of Communism. Most of these novelists rarely deviate from the party line set by the Communist Party leadership at the national or international level or by the Marxist literary critics.

Meri Teri Uski Baat (My, Your and Her Story) (1974), a novel, won the Hindi-language Sahitya Akademi Award in 1976, shortly before his death. Writing on behalf of the same institution, Bhisham Sahni described Yashpal's short stories as carrying on the tradition of Premchand, although focussed more on urban society than that of the rural and lower-middle class. Corinne Friend says that "he has been characterised by many as the most gifted writer of Hindi literature since Prem Chand".

The two volumes of Jhutha Sach (1958 and 1960), Yashpal's voluminous novel based on events surrounding the Partition of India, have been compared to Tolstoy's War and Peace by many writers and critics. Harish Trivedi, a professor of English, says that these comparisons were sufficiently numerous that "with his eyesight failing, Yashpal arranged for someone to read Tolstoy's great work to him — perhaps to figure out what the fuss was all about".

There are three themes that run throughout Yashpal's writings, being those of gender equality, revolution and romance. While much of his work concerns contemporary or near-contemporary situations, he explored the distant past in novels such as Divya (1945), Amita (1954) and Apsara ka Shap (1965).

== Centenary celebrations ==
In 2003–2004, there were centenary celebrations of his birth and a commemorative postage stamp was issued by India Post on 3 December 2003.

== Works ==
Yashpal produced more than 50 works in Hindi, many of which have been translated into other languages. Among his publications are:

=== Novels ===
- Dada Kamred (1941)
- Deshdrohi (1943)
- Divya (1945)
- Party Comrade (1946, reprinted as Gita)
- Manushya Ke Roop (1949)
- '
- Jhutha Sach (two volumes, Vatan Aur Desh : 1958 and Desh Ka Bhavishya : 1960)
- Barah Ghante (1963)
- Apsara Ka Shaap (1965)
- Meri Teri Uski Baat (1974)
- Ve Tufani Din
- Kyon Fanse

=== Collections ===
- Pinjre ki Uran (1939)
- Tark ka Toofan (1943)
- Phulo ka Kurta
- Dharmayudha
- Sach

=== Travel ===
He also wrote two works based on his travels in Eastern Europe, Rah Beeti ("the story of the journey") and Dekha Socha Samjha ("Saw Thought Understood").

== Television adaptations ==
Sunil Batta has directed two television series adapting Yashpal's works: Guldasta in 1995 and Jeevan Ke Rang in 2005.

== See also ==
- List of Indian writers
