= Heinrich von Stietencron =

German Indologist (1933–2018)

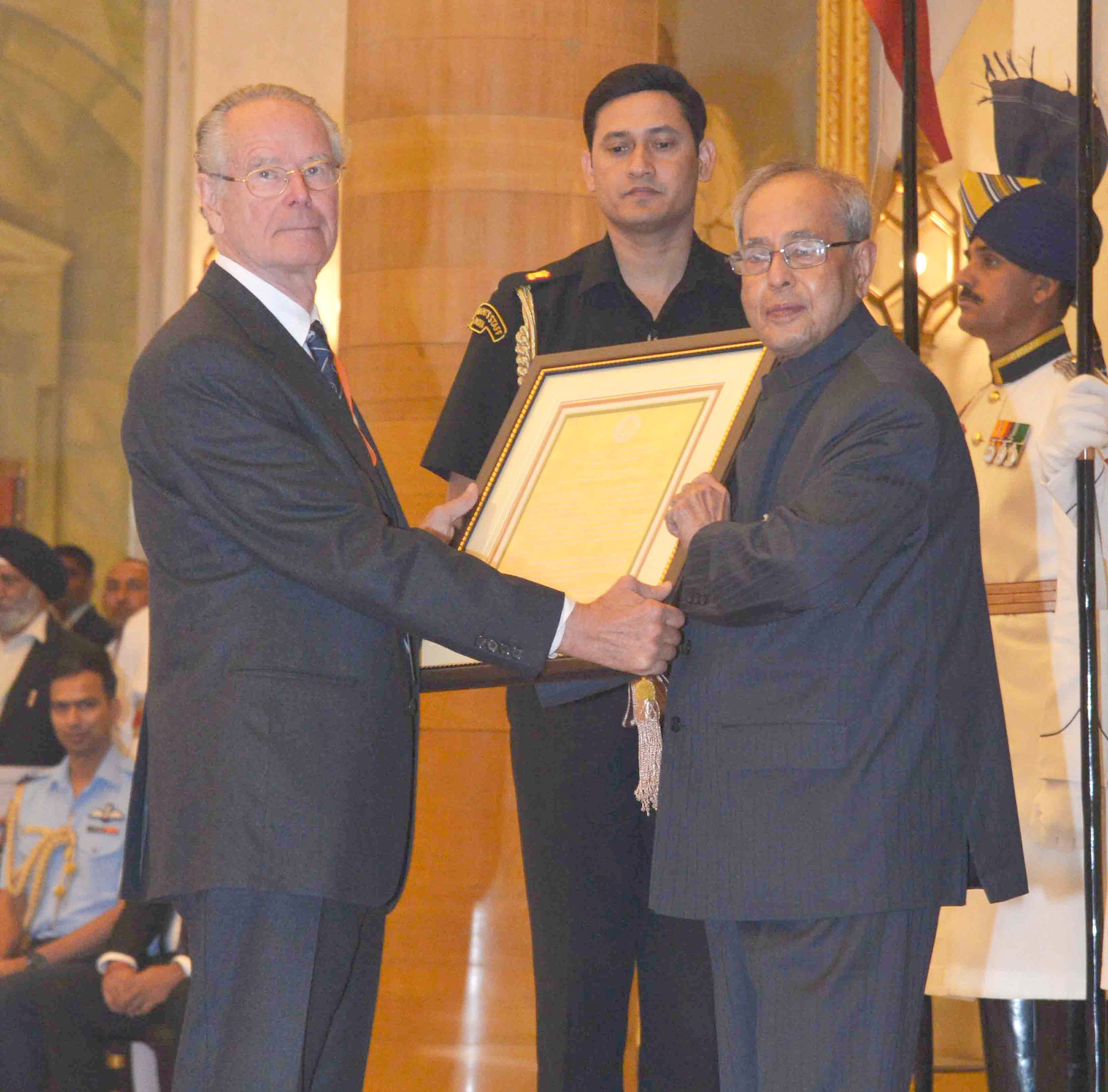
The President, Shri Pranab Mukherjee conferring the first ‘Distinguished Indologist’ Award to the Prof. Emeritus Heinrich Freiherr Von Stietencron of the Federal Republic of Germany at the inauguration of the International Conference of Indologists, at Rashtrapati Bhavan, in New Delhi on November 21, 2015.

Heinrich von Stietencron (18 June 1933 – 12 January 2018) was a German Indologist. During his academic career, he was an emeritus professor and the chair of the Indology and Comparative Religion department at the University of Tübingen.

== Early life and education ==
Stietencron was born 18 June 1933 in Ronco sopra Ascona, Switzerland. He completed his Abitur at the Waldorf School in Stuttgart. Beginning in 1957, he studied philosophy and then Indology at the School of Oriental and African Studies with a scholarship from the German National Academic Foundation.

He traveled in northern India for six months in 1965. His dissertation, titled "Indische Sonnenpriester: Sāmba und die Śākadvīpīya Brāhmaṇa" ("Indian Sun Priests: Sāmba and the Śākadvīpīya Brāhmaṇa") was published by Harrassowitz in 1966.

== Career ==
Beginning in 1965, Stietencron assisted Hermann Berger for five years at the South Asia Institute of the University of Heidelberg. He then continued research and writing, including about the Indian region formerly known as Orissa. In 1973, he became the chair of the Indology and Comparative Religion department at the University of Tübingen, and held this position until 1998, with several visiting professor positions during this time. He continued his academic career as an emeritus professor until 2005.

Hinduism was a major focus of his academic work. He also was a founder and contributed to projects at the Orissa Research Project. During the first World Indology Conference in 2015, Stietencron was awarded the first Distinguished Indologist Award from the Indian Council for Cultural Relations, which was presented by the president of India, Pranab Mukherjee.

== Scholarly society and association memberships ==
- Life member, Heidelberg Academy of Sciences
- Honorary member, Société Asiatique

== Honors and awards ==
- Padma Shri, 2004
- Distinguished Indologist Award, Indian Council for Cultural Relations, 2015

== Selected publications ==
- Ganga and Yamuna: River Goddesses and their Symbolism in Indian Temples, 1972, ISBN 8178242850.
- "The Saiva Component in the Early Evolution" and "The Jagannatha Temples in Contemporary Orissa" in The Cult of Jagannath and the Regional Tradition of Orissa, Anncharlott Eschmann, Hermann Kulke, Gaya Charan Tripathi (eds.), Delhi: Manohar Publications 1978.
- Hans Küng, Josef van Ess, Heinrich von Stietencron, and Heinz Bechert, Christianity and World Religions: Paths to Dialogue with Islam, Hinduism, and Buddhism, 1984. Doubleday.
- Theologen und Theologien in verschiedenen Kulturkreisen, 1986. Düsseldorf: Patmos Verl.
- Angst und Religion. Ed. by H. v. Stietencron. Düsseldorf: Patmos Verl., 1991.
- Epic and Purāṇic bibliography (up to 1985); annotated and with indexes, Co-ed.: P. Flamm. Wiesbaden: Harrassowitz, 1992.
- Töten im Krieg. Ed. by H. v. Stietencron. Freiburg: Alber, 1995.
- Representing Hinduism: The Construction of Religious Traditions and National Identity, Co-editor: Vasudha Dalmia, Delhi: Sage Publications, 1995.
- Der Hinduismus, München: C.H. Beck, 2000 [2010].
- Hindu Myth, Hindu History: Religion, Art, and Politics, Delhi: Permanent Black, 2005, ISBN 81-7824-122-6.
- The Oxford India Hinduism Reader, Co-ed.: Vasudha Dalmia, Oxford University Press, Delhi 2007.
- The Divine Play On Earth: Religious Aesthetics And Ritual In Orissa, India, Co-authors: Cornelia Mallebrein, Heidelberg: Synchron 2008.
