= Jhutha Sach (novel) =

1960 novel by Yashpal

- Volumes: Vatan Aur Desh; Desh Ka Bhavishya
- Author: Yashpal
- Country: India
- Language: Hindi
- Genre: Novel
- Publisher: Lokbharti Prakashan (Rajkamal Prakashan) (India)
- Published: 1958; 1960
- Media type: Print (hardback & paperback)

Jhutha Sach (Hindi: झूठा सच, lit. 'Untruth - Truth') is a novel written by Yashpal in two volumes. It is based on the events surrounding the Partition of India.

The first volume was published in 1958 under the title Vatan Aur Desh. Two years later, the second volume Desh Ka Bhavishya completed the novel series.

The scope and realism of this novel have resulted in its favorable comparison with Leo Tolstoy's War and Peace.
