= Indians in Pakistan =

Widely-defined demographic of Indians within Pakistan

पाकिस्तान में भारतीय; پاکستان میں ہندوستانی

Total population
- 2,016,501

Regions with significant populations
- Predominantly Punjab and Sindh

Languages
- Hindustani (Hindi-Urdu), Punjabi, Sindhi, others

Religion
- Islam; Hinduism; Sikhism

Related ethnic groups
- Indian diaspora

Indians in Pakistan typically refers to Indian nationals working, studying or generally residing in Pakistan as expatriates. It also includes Indian emigrants to Pakistan, Indian spouses married to Pakistanis and Muhajirs.

== History ==
There has been a history of immigration occurring between India and Pakistan due to the two countries sharing a common border. Between 1979 and 1981, there were estimated to be roughly 18,302 Indians who were overstaying illegally in Pakistan. According to Pakistani government figures in 1995, there were believed to be thousands of Indian immigrants living in Karachi, Sindh.

In 2005, the Indian government acknowledged that there were 1,348 Indians in Pakistani jails, including civilians, captured fishermen, convicted criminals and prisoners of war. India has alleged that Dawood Ibrahim, a prominent Indian underworld don, resides in the Pakistani city of Karachi, although this claim has been rejected by Pakistan. Former President of Pakistan, Pervez Musharraf, stated that Ibrahim is "held in 'high esteem' by many in [Pakistan]". In 2008, the Indian foreign ministry advised its citizens to avoid travel to Pakistan after a series of mass-suicide bombings in Lahore, Punjab, Pakistan. As of 2013, there were 1,184 Indians serving prison sentences in Pakistani jails.

== Notable individuals ==
- Ravindra Kaushik, a RAW agent arrested in Pakistan
- Kashmir Singh – Indian spy captured while operating in Pakistan (imprisoned 1973–2008)
- Kulbhushan Jadhav – Ex Indian Navy officer captured near the Iran–Pakistan border; alleged to be involved in espionage and terrorism in Balochistan, Pakistan
- Lakhbir Singh Rode – Indian national and Sikh separatist, member of the Khalistan Zindabad Force
- Parminder Singh Saini – Indian national and Sikh separatist operating in Canada; sentenced to death in Pakistan (later commuted to 10 years)
- Sarabjit Singh – Indian national convicted for terrorist activity and espionage in Pakistan (d. 2013)

== See also ==
- India–Pakistan relations
- Partition of British India (Division of India into Hindu-majority India and Muslim-majority Pakistan)
  - Muhajir people (Muslims who migrated to Pakistan from India following Partition in 1947)
  - Pakistanis in India
- Hindi language in Pakistan
- Bengalis in Pakistan
- Tamils in Pakistan
