= The Indian Press =

Multilingual publishing house

The Indian Press Limited
- Status: Active
- Founded: 4 June 1884; 142 years ago, Allahabad, British India
- Founder: Chintamani Ghosh
- Country of origin: India
- Headquarters location: Prayagraj, Uttar Pradesh, India
- Publication types: Books, magazines, newspapers
- Nonfiction topics: Literature, history, education, children's literature, academic works
- Fiction genres: Fiction, non-fiction, poetry, essays
- Owner: Ghosh family

The Indian Press (also called Indian Press) is a multilingual publishing house established in Prayagraj (formerly Allahabad), Uttar Pradesh in 1884 by Chintamani Ghosh.

The press published notable literary works and supported literary movements in the late 19th century. Between 1908 and 1922, it published 87 works by Rabindranath Tagore. It printed Saraswati, the first Hindi literary magazine, and published works such as Premchand's first Hindi novel and Suryakant Tripathi 'Nirala''s translation of Tagore's writings.

Under the leadership of Chintamani Ghosh, the press published the magazine Saraswati, the Bengali newspaper Prabasi, the English newspaper Modern Review, the English quarterly Indian Thought, and the children's magazine Balsakha. It also issued periodicals like the weekly Deshdoot, the rural magazine Hal, the monthly Sichitra Sansar, the Hindi weekly Abhyuday, the illustrated monthly Manjari, the monthly Vigyan Jagat, and the educational magazine Shiksha, along with numerous books.

The Indian Press is currently managed by the fifth generation of the Ghosh family and continues to publish books in multiple languages on a variety of subjects.

== History ==
Chintamani Ghosh, a former dispatch clerk at The Pioneer, founded The Indian Press on 4 June 1884, in Allahabad, British India, with an initial investment of ₹12 to purchase a treadle printing machine. Over time, it expanded its operations and gained a reputation for excellence in publishing. By the early 20th century, it had emerged as one of the most influential publishing houses in India.

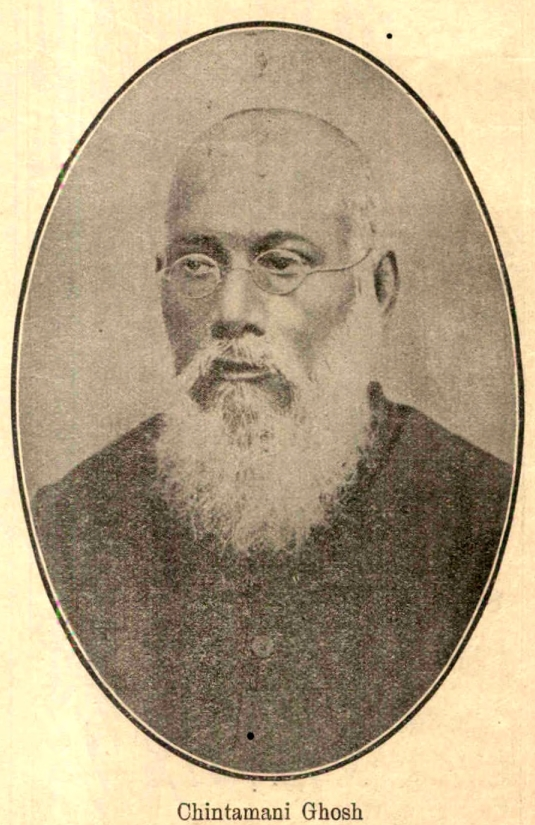
Chintamani Ghosh, the founder of The Indian Press

On 1 January 1900, The Indian Press launched the Hindi magazine, Saraswati, which became instrumental in shaping modern Hindi literature. The magazine featured works by eminent writers such as Munshi Premchand, Suryakant Tripathi, Jawaharlal Nehru, and Lala Lajpat Rai. Saraswati was widely credited with standardizing Hindi and promoting a literary renaissance.

Following the success of Saraswati, The Indian Press launched Prabasi in Bengali language and Modern Review in English. It also established another branch in Kolkata, called Indian Publishing House. It also used to publish an Urdu-language journal called Adīb, however, it did not receive much attention.

The Indian Press continues to operate from its original location on Pannalal Road, near Chandra Shekhar Azad Park and Muir Central College in Prayagraj.

=== Association with Rabindranath Tagore ===
In 1908, Rabindranath Tagore entered into an agreement with The Indian Press for the publication of his works. Tagore granted them publishing rights for a 25% royalty, an unprecedented figure at the time. Between 1908 and 1923, the press published 87 of Tagore's works, including Gitanjali, Chokher Bali, Gora, and Galpaguchchha.

The Indian Press was also the first to publish an illustrated edition of Tagore's works in 1909, featuring seven of his own illustrations.

== Gallery ==
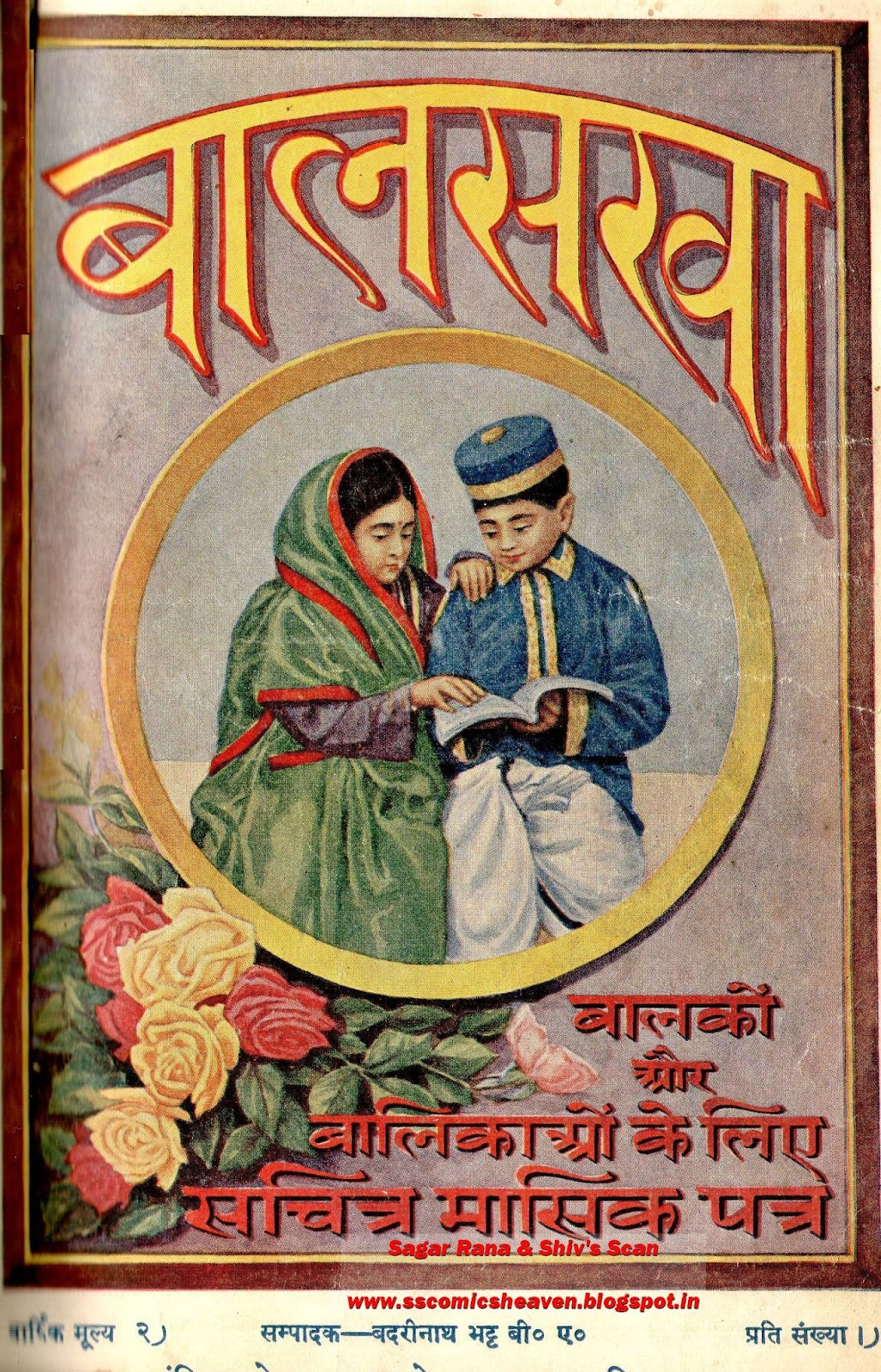
Balsakha was started by The Indian Press in 1917

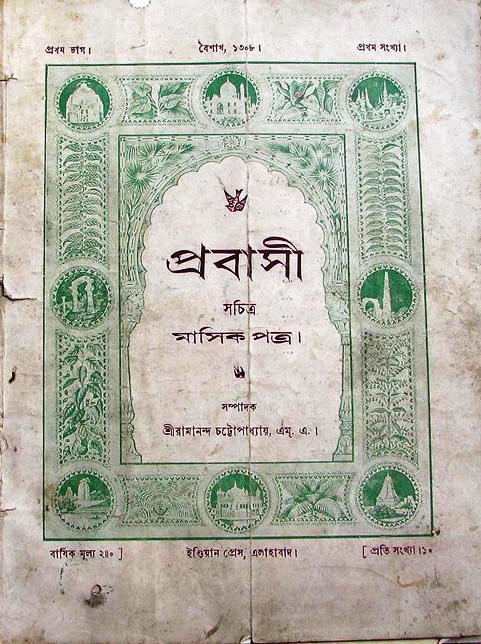
Prabasi magazine, 1st number, 1308 BS, published by The Indian Press

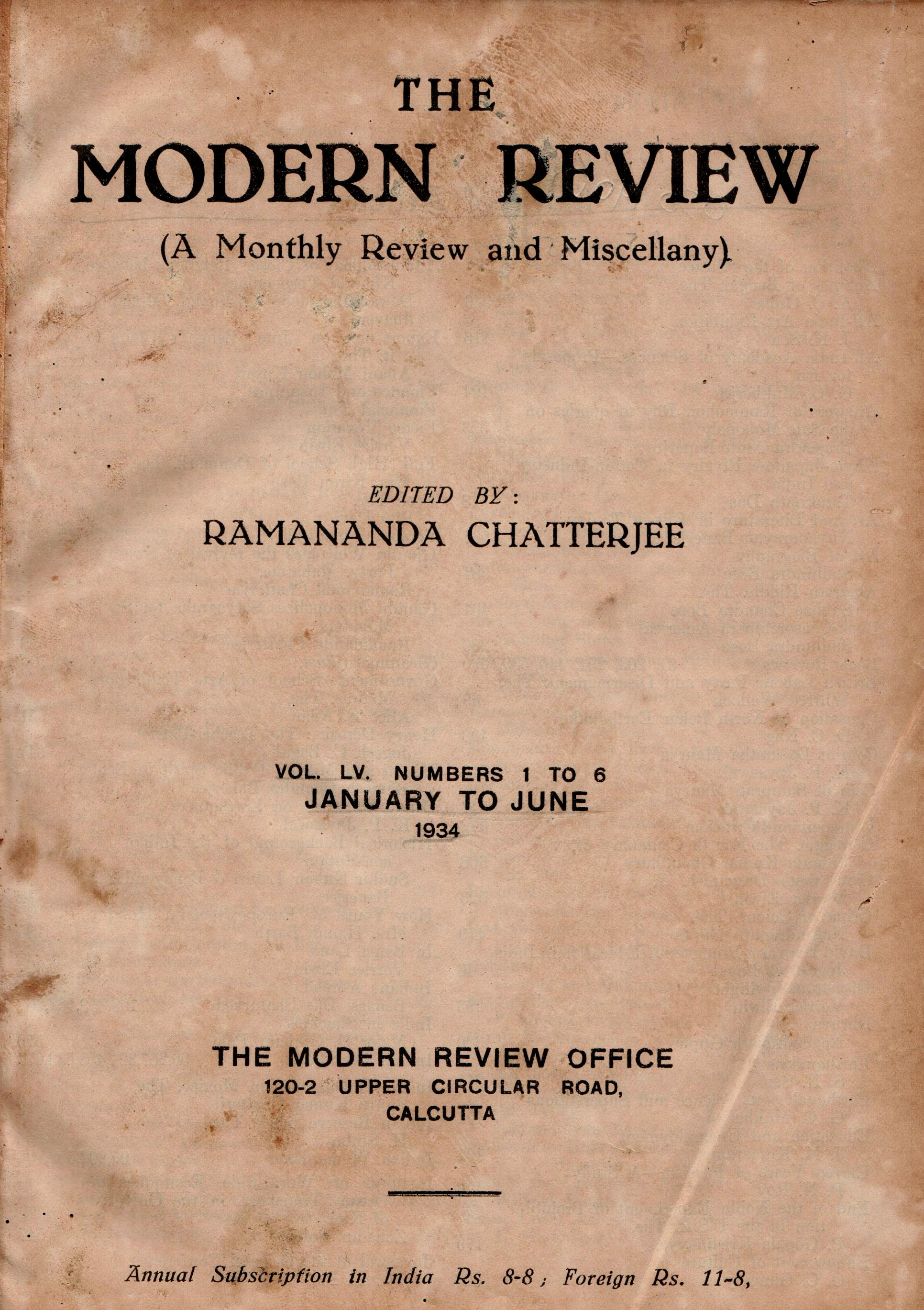
Modern Review, a newspaper, 1934

== See also ==
- Book publishing in India
- Mass media in India
