= Hindi–Urdu controversy =

Linguistic dispute

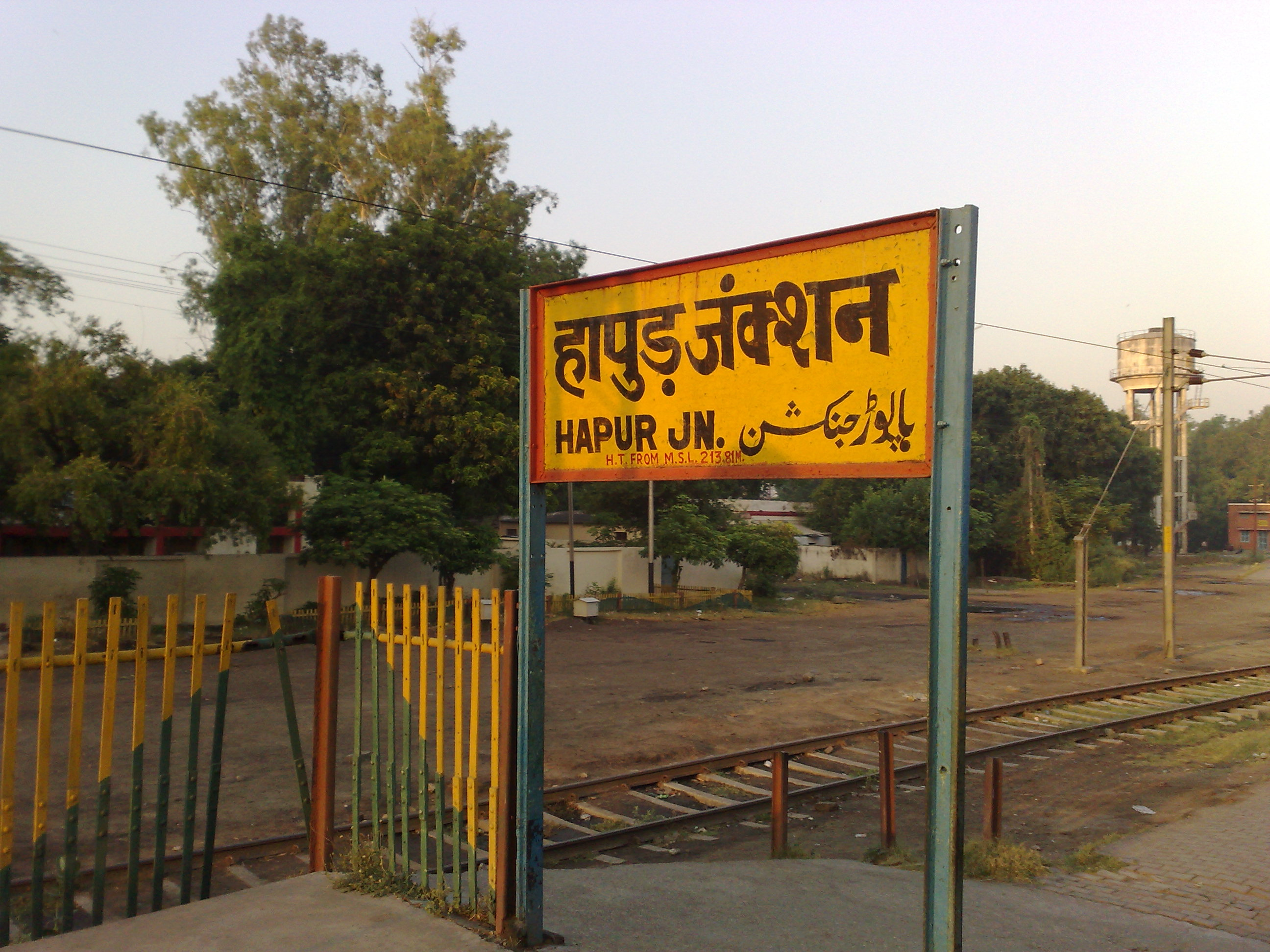
The station board of Hapur Junction railway station in Northern India in Hindi (top), Urdu (bottom-right) and English (bottom-left)

The Hindi–Urdu controversy was a dispute that arose in 19th-century British India over whether Modern Standard Hindi or Standard Urdu should be chosen as a national language. It is considered one of the leading Hindu–Muslim issues of British India.

Hindi and Urdu are mutually intelligible standard registers of the Hindustani language (also known as Hindi–Urdu). The respective writing systems used to write the language, however, are different: Hindi is written in the Devanagari variant of the Brahmic scripts whereas Urdu is written using a modified Nastaliq variant of the Arabic script, each of which is completely unintelligible to readers literate only in one or the other. Both Modern Standard Hindi and Urdu are literary forms of the Dehlavi dialect of Hindustani. A Persianised variant of Hindustani began to take shape during the Delhi Sultanate (1206–1526) and Mughal Empire (1526–1858) in South Asia. Known as Deccani in South India, and by names such as Hindi, Hindavi, and Hindustani in North India and elsewhere, it emerged as a lingua franca across much of Northern India and was written in several scripts including Devanagari, Perso-Arabic, Kaithi, and Gurmukhi.

Hindustani in its Perso-Arabic script form underwent a standardisation process and further Persianisation during the late Mughal period in the 18th century, and came to be known as Urdu, a name derived from the Turkic word ordu or orda ('army') and is said to have arisen as the "language of the exalted camp/horde" (Zaban-i-Urdu-yi-Mu'alla), or in the local Lashkari Zaban. As a literary language, Urdu took shape in courtly, elite settings. Along with English, it became the official language of northern parts of British India in 1837. Hindi as a standardised literary register of the Delhi dialect arose in the 19th century; the Braj Bhasha was the dominant literary language in the Devanagari script up until and through the nineteenth century. Efforts by Hindi advocates to promote a Devanagari version of the Delhi dialect intensified around 1880. The goal was to incorporate Hindi into administration and education, where Urdu had a linguistic monopoly on official work.

In the middle of the 18th century, a movement among Urdu poets advocating the further Persianisation of Hindustani occurred, in which certain native Sanskritic and Prakritic words were supplanted with Persian and Arabic loanwords. On the other hand, organizations such as the Nagari Pracharini Sabha (1893) and Hindi Sahitya Sammeland (1910) advocated a style that incorporated Sanskrit (and to some extent, Prakritic as well) vocabulary while consciously purging out Persian and Arabic words. The last few decades of the 19th century witnessed the eruption of this Hindi–Urdu controversy in the United Provinces (present-day Uttar Pradesh, then known as the North-Western Provinces and Oudh). The controversy comprised "Hindi" and "Urdu" proponents each advocating the official use of Hindustani with the Devanagari script or with the Nastaʿlīq script, respectively. In 1900, the government issued a decree granting symbolic equal status to both Hindi and Urdu. Deploring the Hindu-Muslim divide, Gandhi proposed re-merging the standards, using either Devanagari or Perso-Arabic script, under the traditional generic term Hindustani. Describing the state of Hindi-Urdu under British rule in colonial India, Professor Sekhar Bandyopadhyay stated that "Truly speaking, Hindi and Urdu, spoken by a great majority of people in north India, were the same language written in two scripts; Hindi was written in Devanagari script and therefore had a greater sprinkling of Sanskrit words, while Urdu was written in Persian script and thus had more Persian and Arabic words in it. At the more colloquial level, however, the two languages were mutually intelligible." Bolstered by the support of the Indian National Congress and various leaders involved in the Indian Independence Movement, Hindi, along with English, replaced Urdu as one of the official languages of India during the institution of the Indian constitution in 1950.

== Background ==
Status change of languages
Hindustani in Perso-Arabic script and English made official languages in northern parts of British India, replacing Persian	1837
Hindustani in Kaithi and Devanagari scripts replaced Perso-Arabic script in Bihar during the British Raj in Colonial India	1881
Hindi in Devanagari granted equal status to Urdu in the United Provinces	1900
Urdu declared sole national language in Pakistan	1948
Hindi granted separate status and official precedence over Urdu and other languages in the Republic of India	1950

Hindustani was the native language spoken in northern India (what is historically known as the region of Hindustan), and it belongs to the Western Hindi language class of Central Indo-Aryan languages. Mughal rulers brought with them to India the Persian language. In cities such as Delhi, the local language Khariboli began to acquire some Persian loanwords, giving rise to Old Hindi, the earliest form of Hindi-Urdu. The language continued to be called "Hindi", "Hindustani", as well as "Urdu". While Urdu retained the grammar and core Sanskritic and Prakritic vocabulary of Khariboli, it adopted the Nastaliq writing system.

Urdu, like Hindi, is a form of the same language—Hindustani. It evolved from the medieval (6th- to 13th-century) Apabhraṃśa register of the preceding Shauraseni language, a Middle Indo-Aryan language that is also the ancestor of other modern Indo-Aryan languages. Around 75% of Urdu words have their etymological roots in Sanskrit and Prakrit, and approximately 99% of Urdu verbs have their roots in Sanskrit and Prakrit. The remaining 25% of Urdu's vocabulary consists of loanwords from Persian and Arabic.

The conflict over language reflected the larger politicization of culture and religion in 19th-century colonial India, when religious identities were utilized by the British administration in unprecedented ways. In time, Hindustani written in Perso-Arabic script also became a literary language with an increasing body of literature written in the 18th and 19th century. A division developed gradually between Hindus, who chose to write Hindustani in Devanagari script, and Muslims and some Hindus who chose to write the same in Urdu script. The development of Hindi movements in the late nineteenth century further contributed to this divergence. Sumit Sarkar notes that in the 18th and the bulk of the 19th century, "Urdu had been the language of polite culture over a big part of North India, for Hindus quite as much as Muslims". From 1881 to 1890, Sarkar gives figures which showed that the circulation of Urdu newspapers was twice that of Hindi newspapers and there were 55% more Urdu books as Hindi books. He gives the example of the author Premchand who wrote mainly in Urdu till 1915, until he found it difficult to publish in the language. Non-religious arguments were also sometimes cited in language disputes; for example, the Sadar Court of Bengal argued that the Persian script was superior to Indic scripts because it was roughly 25% faster to write.

Professor Paul R. Brass notes in his book, Language, Religion and Politics in North India,

The Hindi-Urdu controversy by its very bitterness demonstrates how little the objective similarities between language groups matter when people attach subjective significance to their languages. Willingness to communicate through the same language is quite a different thing from the mere ability to communicate.

== Controversy ==
=== British language policy ===
In 1837, the British East India company replaced Persian with local vernacular in various provinces as the official language of government offices and of the lower courts. However, in the northern regions of the Indian subcontinent, Urdu in Nastaliq was chosen as the replacement for Persian, rather than Hindi in the Devanagari script. The most immediate reason for the controversy is believed to be the contradictory language policy in North India in the 1860s. Although the government at the time encouraged both Hindi and Urdu as a medium of education in school, it discouraged Hindi or the use of the Nagari script for official purposes. This policy gave rise to conflict between students educated in Hindi or Urdu for the competition of government jobs, which eventually took on a communal form.

=== Hindi and Urdu movements ===
In 1867, some Hindus in the United Provinces of Agra and Oudh during the British Raj in India began to demand that Hindi be made an official language in place of Urdu. Babu Shiva Prasad of Banares was one of the early proponents of the Nagari script. In a Memorandum on court characters written in 1868, he accused the early Muslim rulers of India for forcing them to learn Persian. In 1897, Madan Mohan Malaviya published a collection of documents and statements titled Court character and primary education in North Western Provinces and Oudh, in which he made a compelling case for Hindi.

Several Hindi movements were formed in the late 19th and early 20th century; notable among them were Nagari Pracharini Sabha formed in Banaras in 1893, Hindi Sahitya Sammelan in Allahabad in 1910, Dakshina Bharat Hindi Prachar Sabha in 1918 and Rashtra Bhasha Prachar Samiti in 1926. The movement was encouraged in 1881 when Hindi in Devanagari script replaced Urdu in Persian script as the official language in neighboring Bihar. They submitted 118 memorials signed by 67,000 people to the Education Commission in several cities. The proponents of Hindi argued that the majority of people spoke Hindi and therefore introduction of Nagari script would provide better education and improve prospects for holding Government positions. They also argued that Urdu script made court documents illegible, encouraged forgery and promoted the use of complex Arabic and Persian words.

Organisations such as Anjuman Taraqqi-e-Urdu were formed in defence of the official status given to Urdu. Advocates of Urdu argued that Hindi scripts could not be written faster, and lacked standardisation and vocabulary. They also argued that the Urdu language originated in India, asserted that Urdu could also be spoken fluently by most of the people and disputed the assertion that official status of language and script is essential for the spread of education.

Communal violence broke out as the issue was taken up by firebrands. Sir Syed Ahmad Khan had once stated, "I look to both Hindus and Muslims with the same eyes & consider them as two eyes of a bride. By the word nation I only mean Hindus and Muslims and nothing else. We Hindus and Muslims live together under the same soil under the same government. Our interest and problems are common and therefore I consider the two factions as one nation." Speaking to Mr. Shakespeare, the governor of Banaras, after the language controversy heated up, he said "I am now convinced that the Hindus and Muslims could never become one nation as their religion and way of life was quite distinct from one another."

In the last three decades of the 19th century, the controversy flared up several times in North-Western Provinces and Oudh. The Hunter commission, appointed by the Government of India to review the progress of education, was used by the advocates of both Hindi and Urdu for their respective causes.

=== Gandhi's idea of Hindustani ===
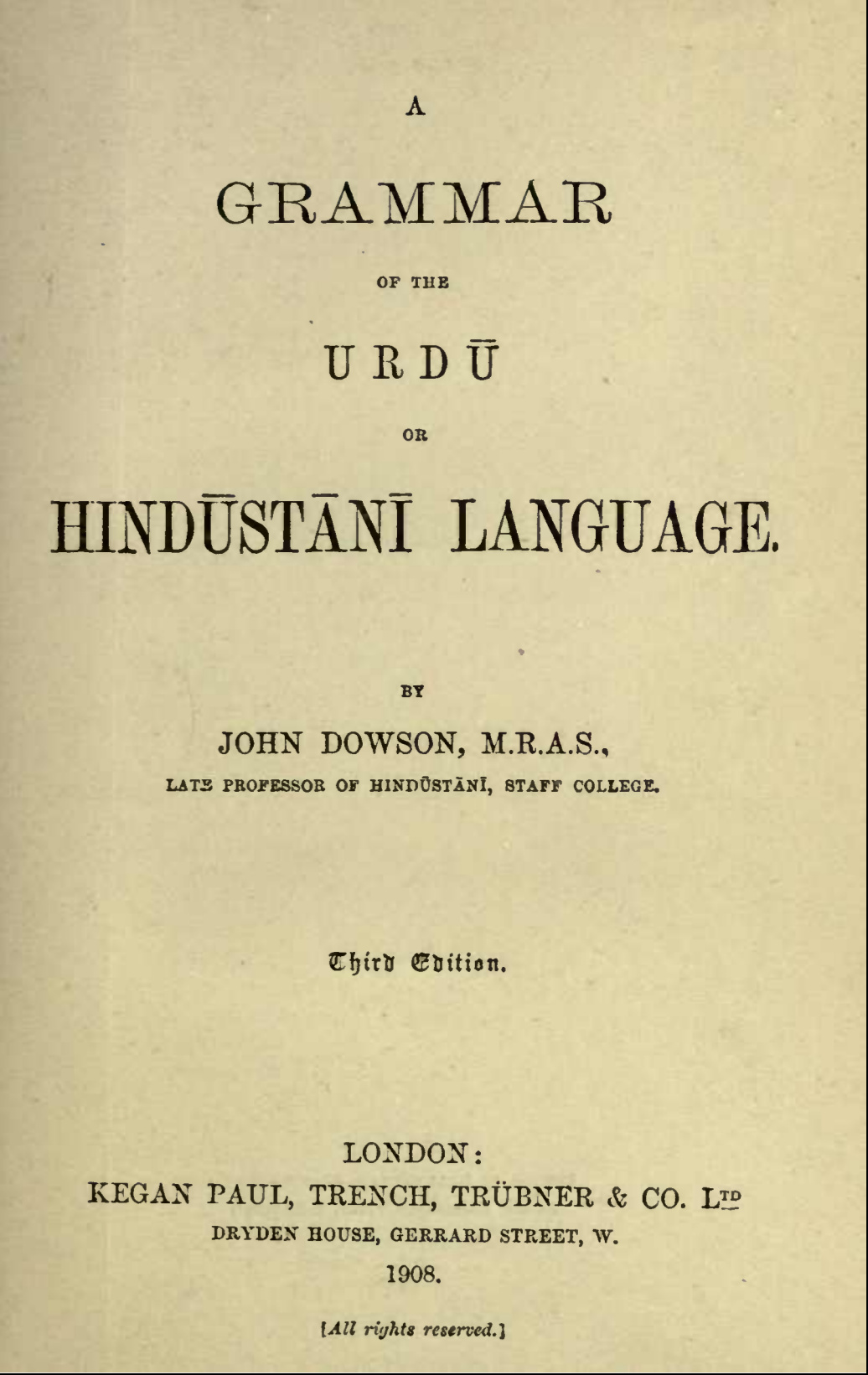
Terms Hindustani and Urdu were synonymous prior to the partition

Hindi and Urdu continued to diverge both linguistically and culturally. Linguistically, Hindi continued drawing words from Sanskrit, and Urdu from Persian, Arabic and Chagatai. Culturally Urdu came to be identified with Muslims and Hindi with Hindus. This wide divergence in the 1920s was deplored by Gandhi, who exhorted the re-merging of both Hindi and Urdu, naming it Hindustani, written in both Nagari and Perso-Arabic scripts. Though he failed in his attempt to bring together Hindi and Urdu under the Hindustani banner, he popularised Hindustani in other non-Hindustani speaking areas.

Nevertheless, Professor Sekhar Bandyopadhyay stated, "Truly speaking, Hindi and Urdu, spoken by a great majority of people in north India, were the same language written in two scripts; Hindi was written in Devanagari script and therefore had a greater sprinkling of Sanskrit words, while Urdu was written in Persian script and thus had more Persian and Arabic words in it. At the more colloquial level, however, the two languages were mutually intelligible." Likewise, Professor Afroz Taj states, "The distinction between Hindi and Urdu was chiefly a question of style. A poet could draw upon Urdu's lexical richness to create an aura of elegant sophistication, or could use the simple rustic vocabulary of dialect Hindi to evoke the folk life of the village. Somewhere in the middle lay the day to day language spoken by the great majority of people. This day to day language was often referred to by the all-encompassing term Hindustani."

=== Muslim nationalism ===
It has been argued that the Hindi–Urdu controversy sowed the seeds for Muslim nationalism in India. Some also argued that Syed Ahmad Khan had expressed separatist views long before the controversy developed.

=== Linguistic purism ===
Due to linguistic purism and its orientation towards the pre-Islamic past, advocates for pure Hindi have sought to remove many Persian, Arabic, and Turkic loanwords and replaced them with borrowings from Sanskrit. Conversely, formal Urdu employs far more Perso-Arabic words than does vernacular Hindustani.

=== Outcome during British rule ===
In April 1900, the colonial Government of the North-Western Provinces issued an order granting equal official status to both Nagari and Perso-Arabic scripts. This decree evoked protests from Urdu supporters and joy from Hindi supporters. However, the order was more symbolic in that it did not provision exclusive use of Nagari script. Perso-Arabic remained dominant in North-Western Provinces and Oudh as the preferred writing system until independence.

== In independent India ==
The language policy of Congress and the independence movement paved its status as an alternative official language of independent India. Hindi was supported by religious and political leaders, social reformers, writers and intellectuals during independence movement securing that status. Hindi, along with English, was recognised as the official language of India during the institution of the Indian constitution in 1950.

== See also ==
- Urdu movement
- Hindi in Pakistan
- Linguistic purism
- Persian and Urdu
- History of Hindustani language
- Hindutva boycott of Bollywood films
