= Dalmia Bhawan =

Coordinates: 25°18′11″N 82°59′50″E

- डालमिया भवन
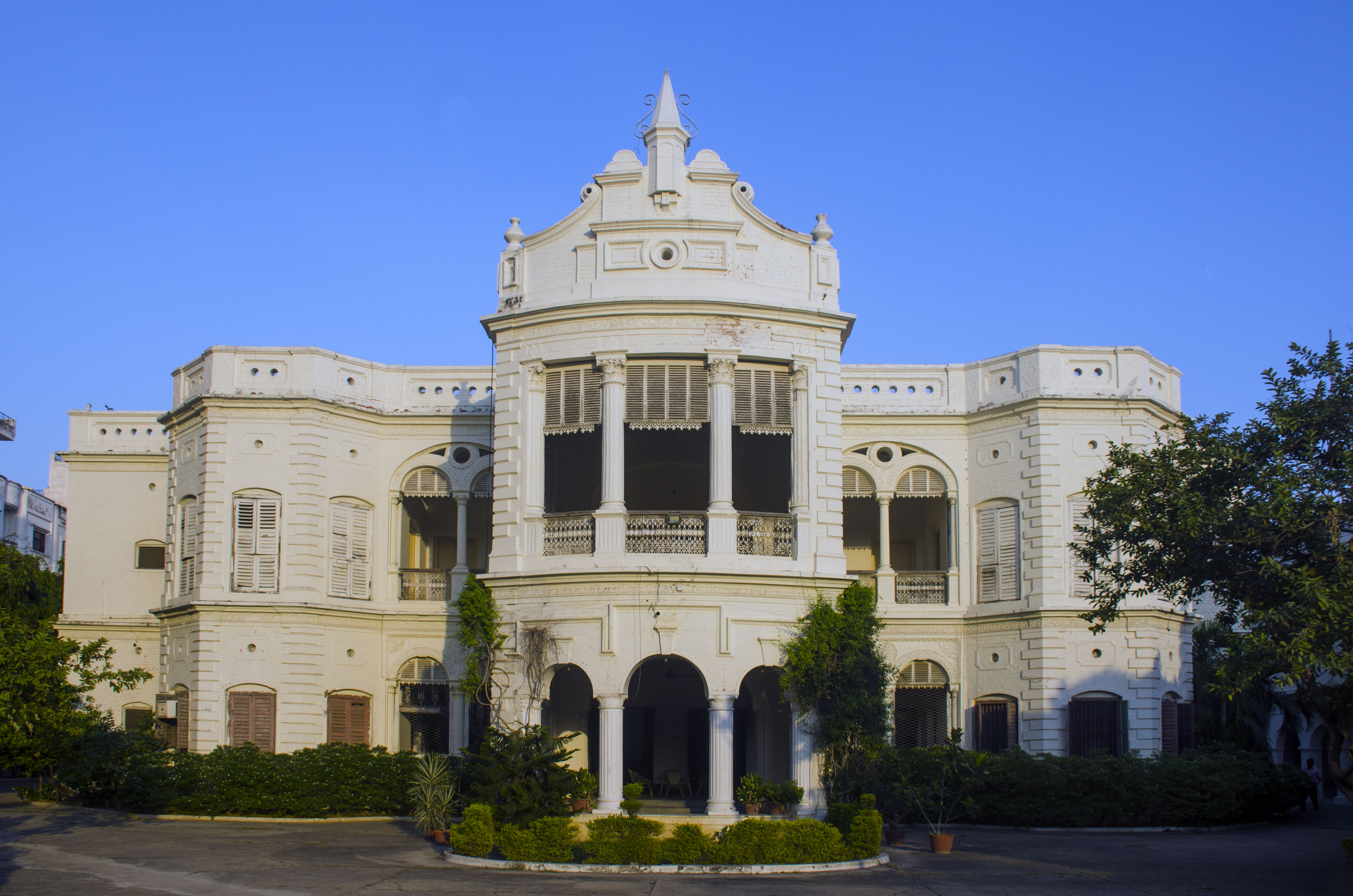
- Dalmia House, Varanasi
- Interactive map of Dalmia Bhawan
- Former names: Dalmia House, Dalmia Bhavan
- Alternative names: SABO

General information
- Architectural style: Indo-Saracenic architecture
- Location: Varanasi, India
- Year built: 1863
- Owner: Kunal Dalmia

Design and construction
- Architect: Raja Kishorilal Goswami

Website
- www.sabo.co.in

Dalmia Bhawan, a mansion situated in Varanasi, was built between 1835 and 1845 by the Goswami family of Serampore a former Danish colony in West Bengal. The house was built in the early 20th century by Raja Kishorilal Goswami of Serampore in Bengal (now West Bengal). In 1960, the property was acquired by the Laxmi Niwas Dalmia. The architecture style is a blend of Indo-Saracenic and Neoclassical elements. The building with its symmetrical look and rooms opening to wide verandas is reminiscent of the ‘garden houses’, a popular concept in the 19th and early 20th century. In India, structures tied to the Danish East India Company are exceedingly rare. Dalmia Bhawan has a Dutch influence showcasing, a clear link to the Danish East India Company. Guests who have stayed in Dalmia Bhawan in Varanasi include Annie Besant, Jawaharlal Nehru, Mahatma Gandhi, Sarojini Naidu, Rabindranath Tagore. Author and poet Harivansh Rai Bachchan mentions Dalmia Bhavan in his autobiography.

== History ==
The Dalmia Bhawan was built by the Goswami family of Serampore in the Bengal Presidency, likely between 1835 and 1845 at Varanasi. The Goswamis were a wealthy merchant family who used to trade under the Danish East India Company and were even granted the hereditary title of "Raja" by the British Raj. Raja Kishori Lal Goswami is credited with commissioning the house. Serampore had been a Danish colonial post (1755–1845), and the family’s connections there influenced the building’s design and materials. Notably, the original Goswami monogram "KGL" can still be seen on the gate of the property, attesting to its founders.

In the 20th century, the estate passed out of Goswami hands. In 1960 it was purchased by Laxmi Niwas (LN) Dalmia, a leading industrialist of the Dalmia family. He intended it as a residence for his mother, Narmada Dalmia. Since then, the house has remained in the Dalmia family. Today Kunal Dalmia (LN Dalmia’s grandson) is its custodian. Under his stewardship the mansion was rechristened "SABO" (short for Savitri Devi, Kunal’s mother) in the early 2020s. Throughout its history, Dalmia Bhawan has been associated with key moments of India’s modern era. During the pre-independence period, it served as a private retreat and meeting place. According to family sources, luminaries of the Indian independence and cultural movements stayed here, most famously Rabindranath Tagore, Mahatma Gandhi and Annie Besant. After independence, the house became largely a private residence for the Dalmia family. In recent decades it has also been used as a guesthouse and venue for social events. By the early 2020s the family announced plans to convert the colonial bungalow into a heritage boutique hotel, ensuring the building’s continued use and preservation.

== Architecture ==
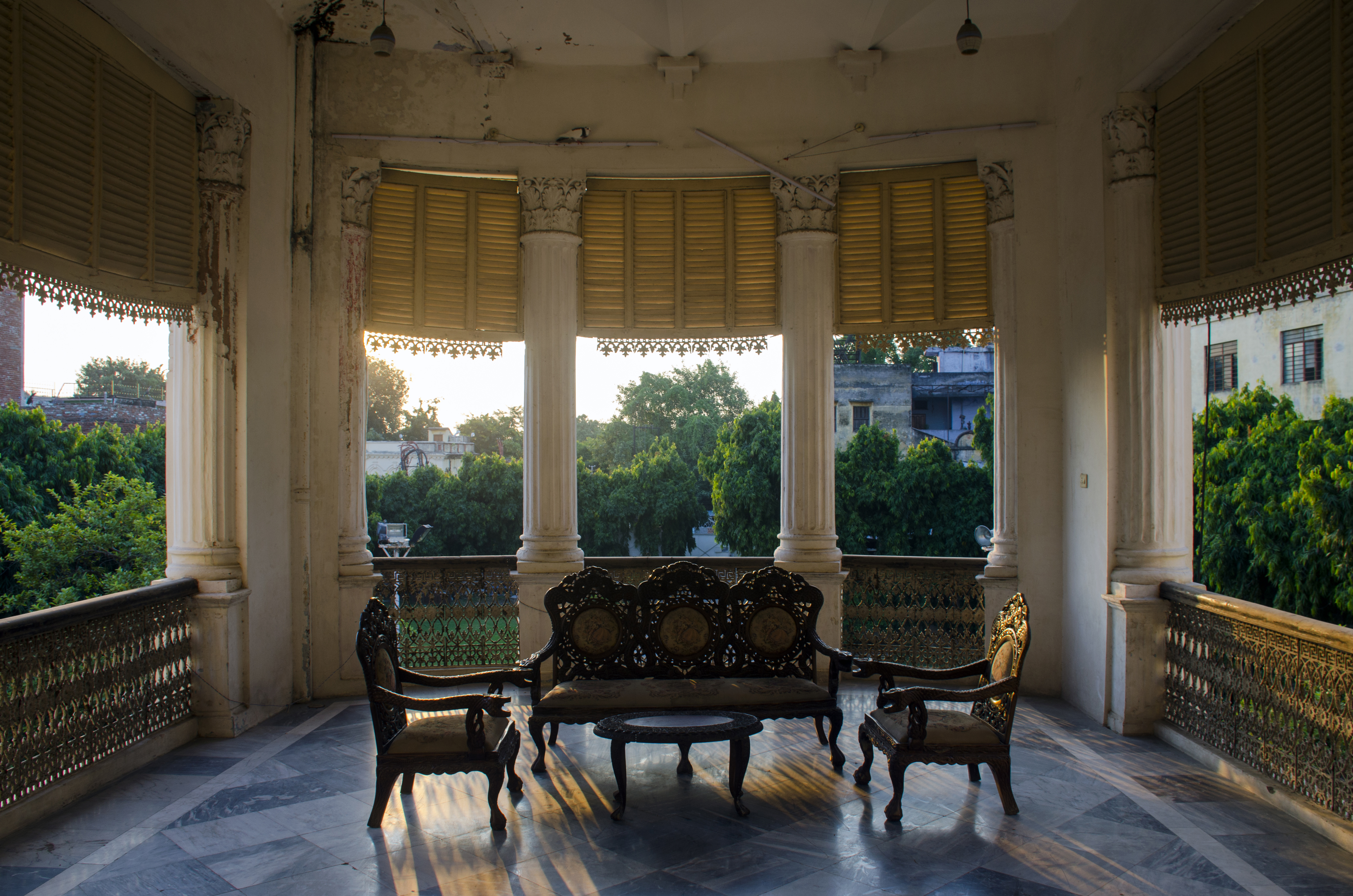
Seating area in the balcony of Dalmia Bhawan

Architecturally, Dalmia Bhawan reflects the eclectic colonial aesthetic of its era. The two-storey mansion is painted a soft white and stands on an expansive 80,000 sq ft landscaped compounds. It was conceived as a "garden house", set amidst lawns and gardens, a concept popular among the 19th-century elite. The facade features a large central portico and broad verandas (balconied galleries) running along the building’s length. The design harmonizes Indo-Saracenic motifs with European neoclassical forms. In particular, the house is notable for its massive single-piece pillars. The entrance and porch are supported by monolithic Tuscan stone columns quarried from the famed Chunar sandstone region nearby.

The overall effect is one of reserved elegance. Contemporary observers have remarked on its "distinct Danish architecture", to the Serampore origin of its builders. Indeed, the style blends Indian and European elements: pointed arches and colonnades hint at inspirations from Mughal architecture and Indo-Saracenic style, while pediments and porticoes recall British neoclassical design. The facade and balconies are relatively unornamented, painted uniformly white, which contrasts with the lush greenery of the compound. The combination of symmetry, broad galleries, and heavy stone columns evokes the colonial-era manor houses of northern India. As such, Dalmia Bhawan stands out in Varanasi as an intact example of 19th-century elite residential architecture, linking Bengal’s Danish past with the style of British India.

== Cultural Relevance ==
In the early 20th century, it was a gathering place for leading intellectuals and activists. The poet Harivansh Rai Bachchan even wrote about the house in his autobiography, reflecting its place in Varanasi’s cultural memory. Under the Dalmia ownership, the house has also been a center of modern-day cultural patronage. LN Dalmia (now deceased) and his descendants have been noted philanthropists in Banaras. It functions as a private guesthouse and banquet venue, hosting weddings, family events, and dignitaries. The Telegraph notes that it even has a banquet hall capable of accommodating up to 1,000 guests. Although it remains a private property, the Dalmias have on occasion arranged tours and cultural events within the mansion for invited guests.

In the 2020s, Dalmia Bhawan has become a prominent example of heritage conservation through adaptive reuse. The Dalmia family announced plans to convert the century-old bungalow into the SABO Boutique Hotel, a heritage hotel. This project, led by Kunal Dalmia, is expressly intended to preserve the building’s historic architecture while providing modern amenities to guests. The conversion has been described as a way to celebrate and share the house’s heritage.
