= Kishorilal Goswami =

Hindi novelist, Writer

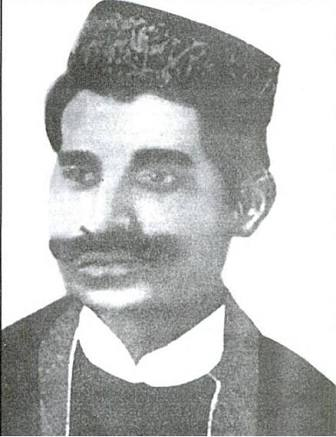
- Kishorilal Goswami
- Born: 1865; Vrindavan
- Died: 1932 (aged 66–67)
- Citizenship: British India
- Occupations: Writer, Novelist, Editor
- Writing career
- Language: Hindi
- Genres: Novel, Drama, Story, Poetry
- Notable works: Razia Begum, Triveni, Pranayini Parinay, Lavanglata, Aadarsh Bala, Rang Mahal Mein Halahal, Malti Madhav, Madan Mohini and Gulbahar

Kishori Lal Goswami (1865–1932) was an Indian writer and novelist. He was born in the year 1865 in a family of Vrindavan. His family was a follower of the Nimbarka Sampradaya. In 1898, Kishori Lal Goswami brought out the magazine 'Novyas' in which his novels were published. He was a member of Saraswati (magazine)'s Panchayati Editorial Board. In addition to about 65 novels, he wrote many poems and his own masterly writings on various subjects. Goswami, the author of the stories Indumati and Gulbahar, has the credit of being the first story writer in Hindi language.

In 1898, Kishorilal Goswami launched a monthly journal Upanya, in which as many as sixty-five novels of Goswami were published. Some of his notable works includes Razia Begum, Triveni, Pranayini Parinay, Lavanglata, Aadarsh Bala, Rang Mahal Mein Halahal, Malti Madhav, Madan Mohini and Gulbahar.

In 1900, a short story named Indumati by Kishorilal Goswami was published in the newly launched Hindi magazine Saraswati. Considering it to be original work, some scholars have described it as the first short story in Hindi.

== Books ==
- Triveni Va Saubhagya Shreni (1888)
- Pranayini-Parinay (1887)
- Hridayaharini Va Aadarsh Ramani (1890)
- Lavanglata Va Aadarsh Bala (1890)
- Sultana Razia Begum Va Rang Mahal Mein Halahal (1904)
- Tarabai
- Gulbahar
- Heerabai Va Behayai Ka Borka (1904)
- Lavanyamayi
- Sukh Sharvari
- Premamayi
- Indumati Va Vanvihangini
- Gulbahar Va Aadarsh Bhratusneh (1902)
- Tara Va Kshatra Kul Kamlini (1902)
- Tarun Tapaswini Va Kutir Vasini
- Chandravali Va Kulta Kutuhal
- Jinde Ki Laash
- Madhavi-Madhava Va Madan-Mohini (in two parts)
- Leelavati Va Aadarsh Sati
- Rajkumari
- Chapla Va Navya Samaj Chitra
- Kanak Kusum Va Masatani (1904)
- Mallika Devi Va Bang Sarojini (1905)
- Punarjanma Va Sautiya Daah
- Sona Aur Sugandh Va Pannabai (1909)
- Anguthi Ka Nageena
- Lucknow Ka Kabra Va Shahi Mahalsara (1906-16)
- Lal Kunwar Va Shahi Rangmahal (1909)
- Gupt Godna (1922-23)
