= Thakur Srinath Singh =

Indian writer

Thakur Shrinath Singh (1901–1996) was a Hindi writer.

== Early life and background ==
Singh was born in Manpur, a village in the Allahabad district of Uttar Pradesh, in 1901. Growing up in a culturally rich environment, he was deeply influenced by the socio-political atmosphere of colonial India, which eventually shaped his worldview and inspired his literary pursuits.

== Literary and editorial career ==
Alongside his literary endeavours, Singh participated in the Indian freedom movement, advocating for independence through his writings and activism.

As an editor, Singh played a pivotal role in shaping the landscape of Hindi literature. He held editorial positions in publications such as "Saraswati," a Hindi literary magazine, "Hal" a periodical dedicated to farmers., and "Deshbandhu," a prominent newspaper Additionally, he spearheaded the editing of children's magazines like Balsakha, Sishu, Balbodh, and the women-centric magazine Didi, thereby contributing to the dissemination of literature across various demographics. He was also a member of the Newspaper Industry Inquiry Committee constituted by the then United Province Government (1946-1947).

== Literary contributions ==
Singh's literary repertoire encompassed a diverse range of genres, from poetry to novels, catering to both adults and children. His children's poetry remains cherished, resonating with readers of all ages. Notable among his works are his novels, including Kshama, Ekakini, Ek aur Anek, Yavvan Soundarya aur Prem, Prajamandal, Jagran, Somnath, and Kavi aur Krantikari.

Singh's children's novels, such as Paridesh ki Sair, captivated young minds with their imaginative narratives and moral lessons. He authored numerous other children's books, including Paridesh, Prithvi ki Kahani, Avishkaro ki Katha, Balkavitavali, Gubbara, Dono Bhai, and Do Kubde aur Anyakathaye, which continue to enchant and educate generations of readers.

He was also awarded by Uttar Pradesh Hindi Sansthan’s Vishisht Hindi Sahitya puruskar (1980–81)
