= Balsakha =

Hindi children magazine

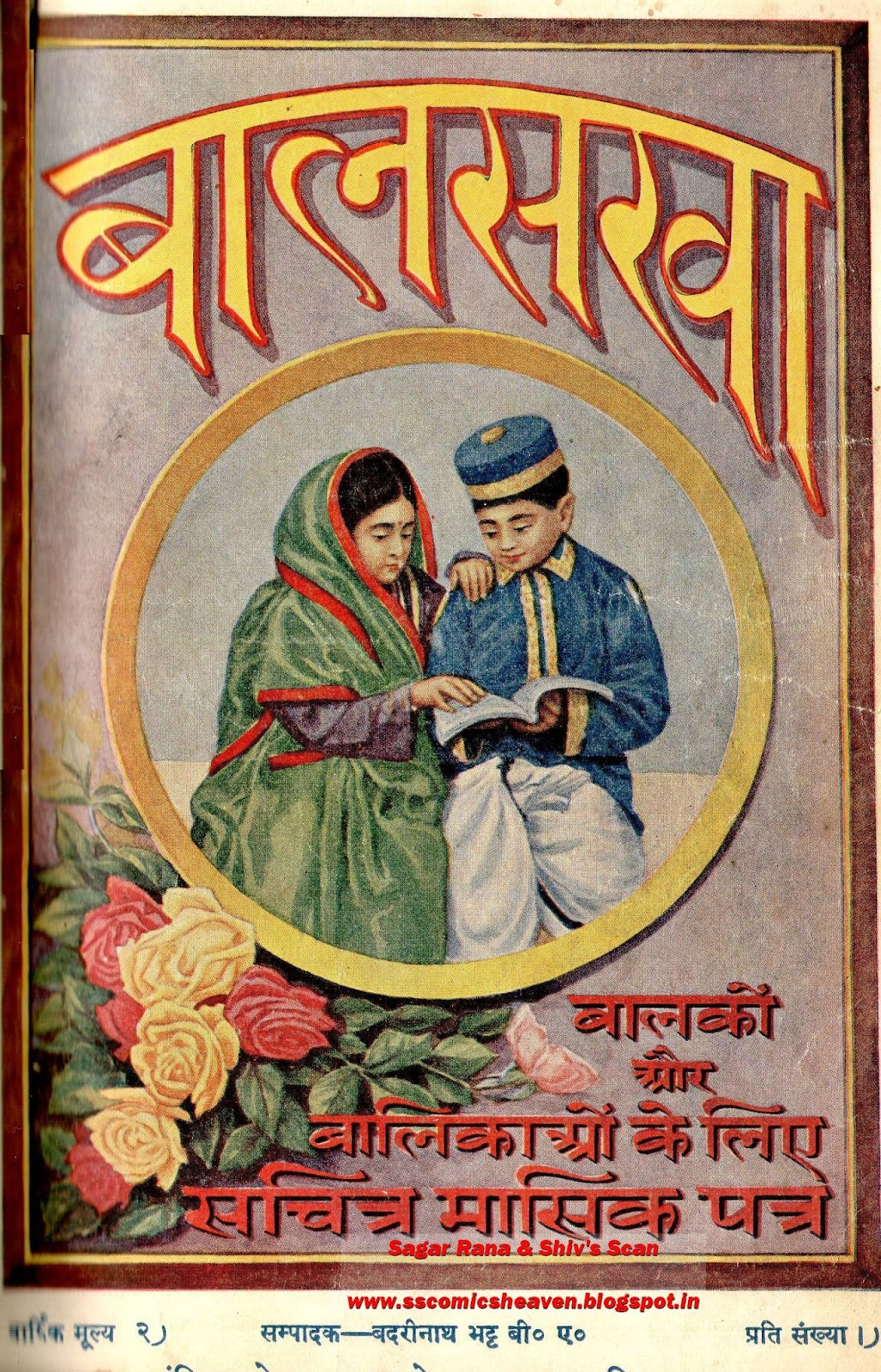
- Photograph of cover page of magazine Balsakha
- Former editors: Pandit Badrinath Bhatt, Devidutt Shukl, Thakur Srinath Singh
- Categories: Indian children's magazines
- Frequency: Monthly
- Publisher: Indian Press Limited Prayag
- Founder: Chintamani Ghosh
- Founded: 1917
- Final issue: 1971
- Based in: Allahabad
- Language: Hindi

Balsakha was one of the most popular children's magazines in Hindi. The Indian Press Prayag began publishing Balasakha in 1917. It was highly influential during its time, shaping young readers and inspiring many to become writers. Balsakha was published for over 53 years.

== History and profile ==
Balsakha was first published in 1917 by Chintamani Ghosh, the founder of Indian Press Prayag (Allahabad).He also published the magazine saraswati. The first editor of Balsakha was Pandit Badrinath Bhatt, and Thakur Srinath Singh later edited the magazine for many years. It was published monthly in Allahabad. The magazine ceased publication in 1971.

== Legacy and content ==
Balsakha is still remembered in Hindi children's literature. It was published monthly for over 50 years. Many notable personalities of that era contributed to children's literature through Balsakha. Balsakha was also subscribed to by libraries in various states and by juvenile jail in British India. However, the Punjab Textbook Committee of pre-independent India stopped its subscription due to its publication of content about various national leaders. Publishers and editors of Balsakha, along with other contemporary magazines, viewed children as an independent audience and continued their focus on children's literature. This dedication to childhood themes is one reason Balsakha remained popular with children for so long.
