= Sanaullah Haq =

Pakistani militant leader (1961–2013)

- Born: c. 1961
- Died: 9 May 2013; Kot Bhalwal Jail, Jammu and Kashmir, India
- Cause of death: Murdered in prison
- Criminal penalty: 2 life sentences

Rana Sanaullah Haq (c. 1961 - 9 May 2013, Urdu: رانا ثناء الله حق, Rānā S̱anāʾu l-lāh Haq, pronounced [ˈraː.na sə.ˈnaː.ʊl.la ɦəq]), also known as Sanaullah Ranjay, was a Pakistani national from Sialkot, Punjab who was serving a life term in a jail in India for involvement in terror acts with the banned militant group Hizbul Mujahideen, as per the verdict by Indian courts. Before his incarceration, he was reportedly involved in Kashmir independence movement and two bombing incidents in Kashmir. On 3 May 2013, he was attacked by a former Indian soldier Vinod Kumar, who had been convicted of murder. Reports of his attack came a day after the murder of an Indian prisoner Sarabjit Singh in Pakistani detention. Sanaullah succumbed to his injuries six days later.

== History ==
Haq was born in the Dalowali village in the Sialkot District of Punjab, Pakistan. He was arrested in 1990 after he accidentally crossed the border. He was convicted under Terrorism & Disruptive Activities Act for militancy and waging war against India and was sentenced to life in prison in 2009, by the Indian courts. According to a controversial report of Hindustan Times, he was a gardener by profession and in 1990s he got associated with Hizbul Mujahideen and was involved in two bomb blasts in 1994 which resulted in death of 14 people. Due to his good conduct, he was granted permission to pursue gardening in the prison. According to the superintendent of the Kot Bhawal, Vinod and Haq were not involved in scuffle before and were on good terms. Sanaullah Haq was one of the "ideal and most peaceful jail inmates" at Kot Bhawal and was part of 'piper band' of the Jammu and Kashmir Prison Department.

== Attack and treatment ==
Haq was attacked in the early hours of 3 May 2013, and suffered serious head injuries. The officials said that he was hit with a sharp weapon (later reported to be an axe). He was attacked a day after Sarabjit Singh's death and the attack was thought to be a tit-for-tat assault. Sanaullah was later admitted to the Government Medical College hospital in Jammu, where he slipped into a coma and his condition was reported to be serious. Later, he was flown to Chandigarh, where he was admitted to the ICU in the Post-Graduate Institute of Medical Education and Research.

== Death ==
On 6 May 2013, the Indian doctors of the PGI Chandigarh reported that Sanaullah was brain dead. The condition of Haq had continued to be critically sick with no neurological improvement. On 8 May, Haq suffered renal failure and doctors reported his condition to be "extremely critical".

Sanaullah died on 9 May 2013 and according to doctors he died from multiple organ failure resulting from severe head injuries. His body was returned to his hometown in Sialkot on 9 May. He was 52 years old at the time of his death. His funeral was attended by a massive gathering and as demanded by the public, he was honored a rare state funeral by the Government of Pakistan.

== Aftermath ==
The Government of Jammu and Kashmir suspended the jail superintendent and ordered a probe after the incident. A case of assault was registered against Vinod Kumar, a former Indian Army serviceman from Uttarakhand who was serving a sentence in the jail and was the main attacker. The Pakistani High Commission in Delhi sought and was provided daily consular access to Sanaullah. According to the mission, Pakistan High Commission has asked for detailed information of the incident, immediate consular access, medical facilities for the victim and security of other inmates. Following his death, the Pakistan High Commissioner requested the Government of India for an international inquiry into the incidence which India promptly denied suggesting that the issue should be addressed through bilateral means. The spokesperson for the Indian Ministry of External Affairs also said that "We would like to reiterate the offer made by us on May 3, calling for a meeting with the relevant Pakistani authorities to take immediate steps to enhance the safety, security and humane treatment of Indian prisoners in Pakistani jails".

== Reactions ==
=== Foreign ===
- Chairman Press Council of India, Justice Markandey Katju, also appealed for his release after the attack and stated:

I appeal to the Indian Government to forthwith send back Sanaullah, a Pakistani prisoner who was attacked in a Jammu jail and is said to be in coma, to Pakistan, as requested by the Pakistan Government. This will be a humanitarian act.

In Jammu and Kashmir, funeral prayers of Sanaullah were offered in absentia in different areas including the Jamia Masjid, Srinagar which was led by All Parties Hurriyat Conference chairman. Chief Minister of Jammu & Kashmir, Omar Abdullah, also showed concern over the incident stating that "the fact this is happening at all is a matter of great regret". He also apologized to the family of the victim for the murder.

=== Domestic ===
- On 7 May, during a telephone conversation with then, the Prime Minister of Azad Kashmir, Chaudhry Abdul Majid, the Prime Minister of Pakistan discussed the health concerns of Sanaullah and prayed for his health. After his death, the Prime Minister termed the event as 'tragic and most unfortunate' and stated:

On behalf of the government and people of Pakistan and on my own, I would like to express my heartfelt sympathies with his family... I would like to reiterate to the Prime Minister of India that the serious matter of ensuring safety and security of Pakistani prisoners be addressed in a humane spirit and steps taken so that such brutal atrocities do not recur.

He also stated that in light of the event leading up to Sanaullah's death, both countries must address the humanitarian issues of the prisoners. The spokesperson of Pakistan High Commission in India stated that this constitutes an "extra-judicial killing of an innocent citizen of Pakistan right under the noses of the Indian jail authorities" and an inquiry of international level should be carried out to find and punish the culprits. His death also prompted the calls for release and repatriation of Pakistani prisoners in Indian jails who have completed their sentences. Pakistani High Commission in a statement demanded release of 47 Pakistani prisoners who are languishing in Indian prisons after serving their time.

==== Demonstrations ====
Protests were held in Pakistan and Kashmir to demonstrate against the attack on Sanaullah. Following the death of Sanaullah, Pakistani inmates at the Kot Bhalwal Jail fasted and staged protests against India. Some Pakistani inmates also had verbal brawls with Indian inmates and to prevent escalation, force was used by jail authorities. Syed Ali Shah Geelani, said that the Government should register the jail superintendent for murder and called for peaceful protest across the Kashmir Valley.

=== Security concerns ===
The Indian government issued an advisory to all states to enhance security for Pakistani inmates serving sentences in Indian jails. The Ministry of Foreign Affairs of Pakistan reacted sternly stating that this is a "matter of deep concern for Government of Pakistan" and that the perpetrators of the crime be brought to justice. The two incidents of Sarabjit and Sanaullah's murders have put strain on the relations of the two country. Following the incidence, Pakistan Foreign Ministry issued a travel advisory stating that some disturbing reports in Indian media indicates that Pakistani travelers may be in danger and also called upon India to provide security to Pakistani visitors. However, Indian Deputy High Commissioner stated that "due to the prevailing security environment in India following recent bilateral incidents", India will be unable to ensure safety and therefore Pakistan should call off visit to Ajmer Sharif this year.

=== Impact on Pak-India relations ===
Sanaullah's murder had an adverse effect on Pak-India relations and have further strained the ties between the two neighbours. According to Hindustan Times, the handling of the case has resulted in a 'face-off' on the matter of probe.
