= Hindi in Pakistan =

Hindi as spoken in Pakistan

"Pakistan's Hindi" written in both Urdu and Hindi.

Modern Standard Hindi is mutually intelligible with Urdu, the national and official language of Pakistan. Both are standard registers of the Hindustani language. As a result of linguistic and cultural similarities, Hindi has had notable influences in Pakistan and is taught as an academic subject in some institutions; before the partition of colonial India, Hindi was taught at major universities in the provinces that came to form Pakistan. While Hindi and Urdu both have a predominantly Indic (Indo-Aryan) base, Hindi uses more Sanskrit (old Indic) words in its educated vocabulary while Urdu incorporates more Arabic, Persian, and a few Turkic (all non-Indic) words for the same. Most poetry, ghazals, qawalis and lyrics use many Urdu words.

== History ==
Before the partition of British India, Hindi was spoken in the region forming Pakistan by the Hindus and Sikhs residing there. It was taught across school and university levels, mainly in Punjab and Sindh, such as in Government College, Forman Christian College, Dyal Singh College, and Karachi University. At Oriental College, research departments in Urdu, Hindi and Punjabi were founded in 1928, though Urdu, Hindi and Punjabi were studied there since its founding in 1870.

The Hindi Pracharini Sabha regularly organised debates in Hindi in major cities of the Punjab, such as Lahore, Sargodha, and Rawalpindi.

After the partition of colonial India, most of these communities left for what became independent India; prominent Hindi writers with origins in Pakistan include Bhisham Sahni, Shailendra, Hullad Moradabadi, Uday Bhanu Hans, Narendra Mohan and others. Conversely, some first-generation Pakistanis who migrated from India during Pakistan's independence in 1947 were familiar with Hindi and the Devanagari script.

Urdu was long associated with the Muslims of the subcontinent by virtue of its historical development and the Urdu movement. During the Pakistan Movement, it was given preference over Hindi as their lingua franca and thus achieved official status in Pakistan.

== Academic study ==
Hindi has drawn increasing focus as an academic subject. There is a growing trend of Hindi experts and the availability of texts in Pakistan. Many Hindi instructors migrated from India, or were educated at Indian universities.

The Department of Hindi at the National University of Modern Languages (NUML) in Islamabad was established in 1973. It became the first university department in Pakistan to provide certificates, diplomas, language courses, Master's and DPhil degrees in Hindi, including the country's first Hindi MPhil degree. It has provided instruction to Pakistani as well as foreign students.

The Hindi Department at the University of the Punjab in Lahore has roots going back to the establishment of the Oriental College; however, it wasn't until 1983 that accredited courses were started. The department awards both undergraduate and postgraduate Hindi courses. At the University of Punjab's Centre for South Asian Studies, Hindi is a mandatory subject for those pursuing an MPhil in regional languages.

The University of Karachi also once had a Hindi department, which was later closed.

== Cultural influence ==
As a result of Bollywood films, Indian soap opera viewership and cable television in Pakistan, Hindi has had a notable cultural influence. Several Hindi words have entered the casual Pakistani lexicon, such as vishwas ("trust"), ashirvad ("blessing"), charcha ("talk"), pati-patni ("husband-wife"), bina ("without"), shanti ("peace"), sambandh ("relations") and other popular phrases. The advent of internet and social media has accelerated such exchanges.

The screening of Hindi films in Pakistani cinemas, which was restricted for nearly four decades, has resumed over the last few years. Much of the dialogues, themes and script-writing used in Hindi films are influenced by Urdu, therefore capturing familiarity with Pakistani audiences. Furthermore, several actors in the Hindi film industry have roots in present Pakistan. Hindi music from Bollywood remains popular and shares similarities with Pakistani music. This has enabled several Indian artists to contribute to Pakistani film soundtracks and vice versa.

Research in Sahiwal found that over 60% of children in Pakistan watch Hindi-language cartoons, being "very much fond of watching Hindi cartoon series named: Chota Bheem – originally Hindi cartoons & Doraemon – Japanese Cartoons but Dubbed in Hindi." The study found that students widely used what the researchers considered to be uniquely Hindi words over uniquely Urdu words in their spoken language with the following results: Bloom Field Hall School (58%), Beacon House School (55%), DPS Sahiwal (65%), The Educators Sahiwal (80%), The Spirit School Sahiwal (70%), Allied School Sahiwal (72%).

Some commentators view these tendencies as an example of globalisation and soft power, while others have described it as a silent cultural invasion or a reignition of the Hindi-Urdu controversy. In January 2017, the Punjab provincial assembly passed a resolution demanding a ban on television cartoons containing Hindi dubbing, and called for their replacement with Urdu. For some Pakistanis, knowing Hindi provides an opportunity to follow Hindi media and develop a cultural understanding of neighboring India, while for others it is an individual interest. In 2015, an Urdu–Hindi cookbook described as the "first of its kind" was published in Pakistan. At Lahore's Information Technology University, the Data Science Lab created an application called the Urdu-Hindi Dictionary which translates words written in Roman transliteration to their selected language.

Some Pakistani Hindus learn Hindi in order to study Hindu texts. Hindi is also spoken amongst the small Indian community in Pakistan. The Indian High Commission in Islamabad operated a Hindi school which gave classes to the children of expatriates.

== Official use ==
At the Wagah border crossing in Lahore, signboards contain Hindi markings alongside Urdu/Shahmukhi and English to facilitate Indian travelers. The Pakistan Broadcasting Corporation operates a Hindi radio service.

== See also ==
- Samrup Rachna
- History of Hindustani
- Hindi-Urdu controversy
- Urdu movement
