= Kulbhushan Jadhav =

Indian national in Pakistani custody (born 1970)

- Born: 16 April 1970 (age 56); Sangli, Maharashtra, India
- Occupations: Naval officer (Pakistani claim); Ex-naval officer (Indian claim)
- Years active: 2003–2016
- Spouse: Chetankul Jadhav
- Parent(s): Sudhir Jadhav (father); Avanti Jadhav (mother)
- Military career
- Branch: Indian Navy
- Service years: 1987–present (Pakistani claim); 1987–2001 (Indian claim)
- Rank: Commander

Kulbhushan Sudhir Jadhav (born 16 April 1970; also spelled Kulbhushan Yadav, alleged alias Hussain Mubarak Patel) is an Indian national who has been incarcerated in Pakistan since 2016. The Pakistani government alleges that he is a spy for the Research and Analysis Wing, India's intelligence agency, and was arrested in the Pakistani province of Balochistan. The Indian foreign ministry says that he was kidnapped from Iran and illegally rendered to Pakistan.

The Pakistani government stated that he was a commander in the Indian Navy who was involved in subversive activities inside Pakistan and was arrested on 3 March 2016 during a counter-intelligence operation in Balochistan. The Indian government recognised Jadhav as a former naval officer but denied any current links with him and maintained that he took premature retirement.

On 10 April 2017, Jadhav was sentenced to death by a Field General Court Martial in Pakistan. On 18 May 2017, the International Court of Justice stayed the execution pending the final judgement on the case. On 17 July 2019, the court rejected India's appeal for Jadhav's release and ordered Pakistan to suspend the execution. It ruled that Pakistan will have to review the entire process of trial and conviction of Kulbhushan Jadhav and provide India with consular access. Pakistan allowed one Indian consular visit to Jadhav, but subsequent visits have been denied.

== Background ==
Jadhav was born to a Marathi family in Sangli, Maharashtra, on 16 April 1970 to Sudhir and Avanti Jadhav. His father is a retired Mumbai Police officer.

Jadhav is married and has two children. His family resides in Powai, Mumbai. According to reports in the Pakistani media, Jadhav joined the Indian National Defence Academy in 1987 and was commissioned in the engineering branch of the Indian Navy in 1991.

Pakistani media has also reported that he began to gather information and intelligence within India after the 2001 attack on the Parliament of India. After 14 years of service, he was inducted into intelligence operations in 2003 and established a small business in Chabahar in Iran from where he made several undetected visits to Karachi and Balochistan.

== Arrest ==
According to the Pakistani government, on 3 March 2016, Jadhav was arrested inside Balochistan in Mashkel near the border region of Chaman. He was arrested during a counterintelligence raid conducted by security forces. India denied the claim and said he was abducted from Baluchestan, Iran.

Pakistani security forces reported Jadhav as a serving officer in the Indian Navy and stated that he was commissioned to the Research and Analysis Wing (RAW), India's external intelligence agency. They believed him to be involved in subversive activities in Balochistan and Karachi. Jadhav was soon shifted to Islamabad for interrogation. While according to Indian sources, Jadhav was kidnapped in the city of Sarbaz in Iran by a man by the name of Mullah Omar Irani, a commander of Jaish-ul-Adl, who later handed over Jadhav to the Pakistani Army.

== Activities ==
Pakistan stated that Jadhav entered Chabahar in 2003 with a visa stamped on a fake passport numbered L9630722, where he assumed the identity of Hussain Mubarak Patel—born on 30 August 1968, from Maharashtra, India. Pakistani officials claimed that his job was to destabilise Pakistan by strengthening a separatist movement in Balochistan and Karachi – a mission which officially began in 2013.

Balochistan Home Minister Sarfraz Bugti said that Jadhav was obviously working for RAW and was in contact with Baloch separatists and militants, fueling sectarian violence in the province and the country. He further added that he was involved in financially supporting militants and that Jadhav has admitted his involvements in Karachi's unrest. Interrogation also reportedly revealed that naval combat training was being conferred to Baloch separatists, in an attempt to target the ports of Gwadar and Karachi. Pakistani authorities stated that Jadhav, during his interrogation, gave details about his funding, and plans to destabilise the country. They added that Jadhav also disclosed the presence of other Indian intelligence operatives in the southern metropolis.

During interrogation Jadhav also reportedly revealed that at Wadh, he was in contact with Haji Baloch, who provided financial and logistic support to Baloch separatists and the IS network in Karachi. He also said that the masterminds of the Safoora bus attack, where gunmen shot dead 45 Ismaili passengers, were also in contact with Haji Baloch. Jadhav added that he had met Baloch several times, sometimes for planning sectarian violence in Karachi and the rest of Sindh. Pakistan said that, based on Jadhav's information, it had arrested hundreds of undercover operatives.

Asim Bajwa told the press that Jadhav converted to Islam, adopted a false identity and worked at Gadani under the cover of a scrap dealer. He stated that Jadhav established a network of operatives, provided funds, arranged to smuggle people into the country for the purpose of terrorism and reportedly purchased boats at the Iranian port in Chabahar to target Karachi and Gwadar ports in an alleged terrorist plot. According to him, Jadhav's goal was to sabotage the China-Pakistan Economic Corridor through propaganda – with Gwadar port as a special target – and also to create disharmony among the Baloch nationalist political parties. He also said that Jadhav told the interrogators to use a code phrase – "your monkey is with us" – to inform his handlers and the Indian authorities about his arrest. Asim also claimed to have confiscated maps from him and enunciated that there could be no clearer evidence of foreign interference in Pakistan. He termed the arrest of an intelligence or an armed forces officer of his rank a big achievement.

== Indian government reaction ==
The Indian Ministry of External Affairs claimed that Jadhav was an Indian Navy officer but had retired prematurely and he had no current link with the government since his retirement. The Indian High Commission also sought consular access to Jadhav but Pakistan did not agree to it. Pakistan's diplomat to India said that consular access wasn't automatic during cases related to security, explaining Jadhav had been travelling "under a fake name with an original Indian passport" since 2003.

The family of Kulbhushan Jadhav and those who knew him stated that they never knew that Jadhav had left Indian Navy, along with starting his own business.

== Media coverage ==
According to Indian sources, Jadhav was abducted by Pakistan's forces from the Iran–Pakistan border and Pakistan fabricated his documents and leaked them without realising there were glaring inconsistencies in the same. According to sections of Indian media, the Sunni group Jaish ul-Adl is responsible for the kidnapping of Jadhav from the Iran–Pakistan border.

According to Indian officials, Jadhav owned a cargo business in Iran and had been working out of Bandar Abbas and Chabahar ports. "It appears that he strayed into Pakistani waters. But there is also a possibility that he was lured into Pakistan sometime back and fake documents were created for him by the ISI."

Some Indian intelligence officials also alleged that Jadhav was abducted from the Iran–Pakistan border by an extremist radical group called Jaishul Adil. Jaishul Adil, designated a terrorist organisation by Iran, is linked to Al Qaeda and has been often accused of targeting Iranian border guards. They also pointed to the inconsistencies between the claims made by Balochistan minister Sarfaraz Bugti that Jadhav was picked up from Chaman on the Afghan border, and those made by General Bajwa that he was picked from Saravan.

Indian author and journalist Hussain Zaidi claimed that Jadhav was a spy and may have been arrested by Pakistan's Intelligence Bureau because of complacency setting in, after a stay period of 14 years. It is alleged that his phone was on surveillance and his habit of talking in Marathi while conversing with his family blew his cover, as it did not commensurate with his fake identity.

According to the Pakistani newspaper The News, German diplomat Gunter Mulack While speaking at the Pakistan Institute of International Affairs, claimed that Jadhav was caught by the Taliban and sold to Pakistani intelligence. Pakistani newspaper The News also noted that no Taliban groups operate in Iran, and stated that Mulack's statement reflected a "poor understanding of the issues and the dynamics of regional politics." After Jadhav's sentencing, Mulack told the Times of India that his information was based on "unconfirmed speculation from reliable sources which I cannot identify, nor confirm. Maybe it is not true."

In April 2016, Islamabad briefed diplomats of various countries regarding Jadhav's arrest and his claimed involvement in terrorist activities. The evidence was also shared with the United States and the United Kingdom. Separately, Pakistan's Interior Minister Nisar Ali Khan held a meeting with the Iranian ambassador. In September, Pakistan prepared a dossier outlining evidence of Indian-sponsored terrorism and provided it to the United Nations Secretary-General. It included Jadhav's details.

According to the Indian newspaper and news channel NDTV, in December 2016, Sartaj Aziz, who functioned as the then Pakistan's Foreign Minister, told members of the country's senate that there was insufficient evidence presented of Jadhav's alleged espionage. "What the dossier contained on Indian spy Kulbhushan Yadav were mere statements. It did not have any conclusive evidence." and that they were waiting for more details.

In January 2019, Vikram Sood who headed R&AW from 2000 to 2003 claimed that Pakistan had no leverage over India on Jadhav. He claimed, "No spy worth his salt will be caught with his passport. The charges against him are laughable."

== Confession video ==
During the joint conference held by the army and the government, a video confession by Jadhav was made public. Jadhav in the video alleged to have said that the Indian intelligence agency RAW was involved in destabilising Pakistan. He also said that he was a serving officer of the Indian Navy and was working in Pakistan at the behest of the RAW.

Referring to the video, Bajwa said, "There can be no clearer evidence of Indian interference in Pakistan," and added that Jadhav's activities were nothing short of state-sponsored terrorism. In the video, Jadhav acknowledged that he launched a covert operation against Pakistan from the Iranian port of Chabahar for which he used to get instructions from Research and Analysis Wing's joint secretary Anil Gupta. He also said that the RAW had been funding the Baloch separatists for the Balochistan insurgency. Jadhav said:

I am still a serving officer in the Indian Navy and will be due for retirement in 2022. By 2002, I commenced intelligence operations. In 2003, I established a small business in Chabahar in Iran. As I was able to achieve undetected existence and visits to Karachi in 2003 and 2004 and having done some basic assignments within India for RAW, I was picked up by RAW in 2013.

In the video, Jadhav also revealed that he had been directing various activities in Karachi and Balochistan on instructions from RAW since 2013 and had a role in the deteriorating law and order situation in Karachi. While giving details of these activities, Jadhav said:

These activities have been of anti-national or terrorist nature which resulted in the killing and wounding of Pakistani citizens.

India has rejected the video confession. Union Minister Kiren Rijiju claimed, "It is a completely doctored video, fake video made by Pakistan. They are just cooking up stories and doctoring videos to defame India." Indian agencies have claimed that the video released by Pakistan was heavily edited and the audio has been spliced in several places.

== Role of Iran ==
On 3 April, it was reported that Iran was investigating whether Jadhav crossed the Pakistan-Iran border illegally after the matter was taken up by Pakistani officials in Hassan Rouhani's visit to Islamabad. However, Rouhani denied the report as a rumour, saying that the matter was not even mentioned. Iranian Ambassador to India Gholamreza Ansari said that Iran was probing into the matter. He said that once Iran completes the investigation, it will share the reports with "friendly countries". The Iranian embassy in Pakistan criticized "certain elements in Pakistan" for spreading "undignified and offensive" remarks that were attributed to Rouhani and added that these rumours "will not impact the positive views of the two countries regarding each other" as Pakistan had proven to be Iran's "trusted partner and neighbour".

== Sentence ==
On 10 April 2017, Jadhav was sentenced to death by a Field General Court Martial (FGCM) in Pakistan, following a confession before the magistrate and court. Jadhav's trial lasted three and a half months and the charges he was convicted for included spying for India, waging war against Pakistan, sponsoring terrorism, and destabilising the state. He was tried in a military court due to his naval background and the sensitive nature of his case, involving espionage and sabotage. The sentence was confirmed by army chief Qamar Javed Bajwa, and released via the ISPR. Pakistan's Defence Minister Khawaja Muhammad Asif stated that under the provisions of the Pakistan Army Act of 1952, Jadhav had the right to appeal against his conviction on three appellate forums within 40 days.

India accused Pakistan of denying consular access to Jadhav despite several requests. Pakistan, it was said, had also not informed India about Jadhav's trial. As of 2 July 2017, the number of denied consular access stood at 18.

Following the sentencing, the government of India summoned Pakistani High Commissioner to India, Abdul Basit and issued a demarche stating that the proceedings that led to Jadhav's sentencing were farcical and that India would regard Jadhav's execution as murder in the first degree. Basit replied to the Indian foreign secretary that "on the one hand you perpetrate terrorism in Pakistan, and record a protest against us on the other. We have not done anything wrong. A terrorist must be punished."

In an interview to India Today, Basit said Pakistan held sufficient evidence against Jadhav and that it was shared with the Indian government. He also said that Jadhav was given a fair trial, including the right to seek clemency. This was in contrast to his stand before the senate in December 2016.

In a statement issued in the Parliament of India on 11 April 2017, Rajnath Singh, India's Minister of Home Affairs, reiterated that Jadhav was kidnapped by Pakistani agencies from Iran and put through trial as a RAW agent. Sushma Swaraj, India's Minister of External Affairs said there was no evidence of any wrongdoing by Jadhav and termed his sentencing an act of "premeditated murder". Swaraj said that if Pakistan implemented the death sentence, the bilateral relations between both countries would face dire consequences.

During a briefing to the Senate of Pakistan, Pakistani defence minister Khawaja Asif stated that Jadhav's prosecution followed due legal process based on the country's laws, rules, and regulations and "there was nothing in the legal proceedings that were against the law." He said that Jadhav had been provided a defending officer throughout the course of his trial. He rejected India's accusations of terming the trial a "premeditated murder". Asif added that Pakistan would allow no concessions to elements who threatened its security and stability, from inside the country or across the border.

=== International Court of Justice ===
In May 2017, India approached the International Court of Justice (ICJ), asserting that Pakistani authorities were denying India its right of consular access to Jadhav in violation of the Vienna Convention.

The ICJ proceedings began in The Hague on 15 May to review the case. India and Pakistan both sent their legal teams to put forward their arguments, led by Harish Salve and Khawar Qureshi respectively. On 18 May 2017, the International Court of Justice stayed the hanging of Jadhav.

On 22 June 2017, Pakistani sources confirmed that Jadhav had sought clemency from the country's army chief following his conviction. Pakistan also released a new confessional video of Jadhav, in which he stated that he visited Karachi twice for gathering intelligence on naval facilities. He also admitted to supporting and funding, on behalf of India's RAW, Baloch militants affiliated with the BLA and BRA, in addition to infiltrating and establishing "30 to 40 RAW operatives along the Makran Coast" for involvement in terrorist activities. Jadhav said that RAW's activities in Balochistan and Sindh were conducted under the direction of Anil Kumar Dhasmana. India's Foreign Ministry again dismissed the confession as "false propaganda", stating that Pakistan was trying to influence ICJ proceedings while denying the consular rights to Jadhav. ICJ did not allow Pakistan to play the video during the hearing.

On 25 December, Jadhav's mother and wife met Jadhav in Islamabad after being allowed permission by Pakistani authorities. India subsequently denounced Pakistan for its handling of the visit of the wife and mother of Jadhav, saying they were harassed and prevented from talking to Jadhav freely.

India moved to the International Court of Justice (ICJ), which after deliberation stayed the execution of the sentence passed by the Pakistani military court, the ICJ also found a violation of Vienna Convention on Diplomatic Relations by Pakistan and directed Pakistan to provide consular access to Kulbhushan Jadhav in its July 2019 verdict.

== See also ==
- India–Pakistan relations
- Ravindra Kaushik, a RAW agent arrested in Pakistan
- Sarabjit Singh, an Indian arrested on terrorism and espionage charges in Pakistan
- Kashmir Singh, an Indian spy arrested in Pakistan
- Indians in Pakistan
