= Nagari Pracharini Sabha =

Literary Organisation for the promotion of Hindi

- नागरी प्रचारिणी सभा
- Emblem of Nagari Pracharini Sabha
- Abbreviation: NPS
- Established: 16 July 1893; 133 years ago
- Founder: Shyamsundar Das
- Coordinates: 25.319619°N 83.015084°E
- Official language: Hindi
- President: Vyomesh Shukla
- Key people: Madan Mohan Malaviya, Bharatendu Harishchandra, Ramchandra Shukla, Mahavir Prasad Dwivedi, George Abraham Grierson
- Publication: Hindi Literature
- Website: nagaripracharinisabha.com

The Nagari Pracharini Sabha (ISO: Nāgarī Pracāriṇī Sabhā lit. 'Society for Promotion of Nagari'), also known as Kashi Nagari Pracharini Sabha, is an organization founded in 1893 at the Queen's College, Varanasi for the promotion of the Devanagari script (over Kaithi) and the Hindi language. Currently, the organization operates two additional official branches, located in New Delhi and Haridwar. (Note: Other organizations dedicated to the promotion of the Devanagari script include the Deoria Nagari Pracharini Sabha and the Arrah Nagari Pracharini Sabha. Both of these organizations operate autonomously.)

The organization played a pivotal role in promoting Khariboli for official and literary purposes, as well as in documenting and printing the existing literature of Braj Bhasha and Awadhi by locating and preserving manuscripts.

== History ==
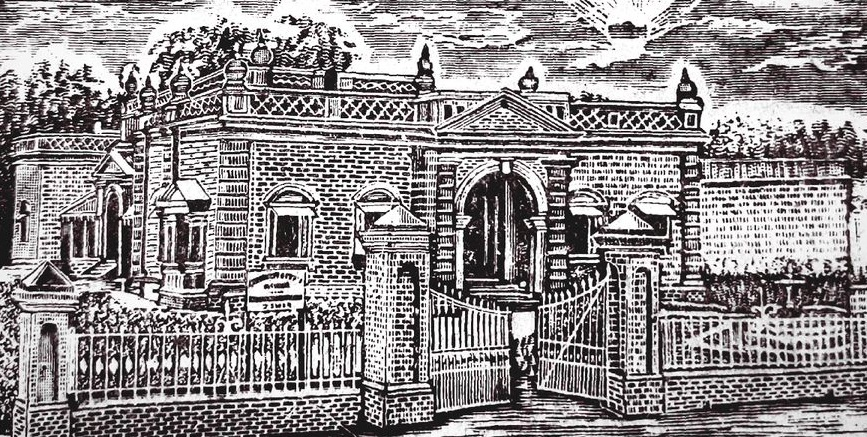
The early 20th-century structure of the Nagari Pracharini Sabha.

The idea of establishing the Kashi Nagari Pracharini Sabha was conceived by three students at Queen's college, Varanasi – Babu Shyamsundar Das, Pandit Ramnarayan Mishra, and Shivkumar Singh. Among the members in the first year were renowned scholars such as Pandit Sudhakar Dwivedi, George Grierson, Ambikadatt Vyas, and Chaudhary Premghan.

In 1899, it helped Chintamani Ghosh, proprietor of Indian Press, establish Saraswati, first monthly magazine in Modern Standard Hindi, which came out in January 1900.

On March 3, 1930, the institute inaugurated the Bharat Kala Bhavan. (Note: Originally founded as Bharatiya Lalit Kala Parishad in 1920, it was later renamed Bharat Kala Bhavan under the stewardship of NPS.) The Sabha played a crucial role in its growth, contributing significantly through the addition of features such as the Roerich Room in 1932 and the launch of the art journal Kalā Nidhi in 1942. It also facilitated the Bhavan’s participation in prominent exhibitions in Kolkata, New Delhi, Varanasi, and London. In 1950, the collection was transferred to the Banaras Hindu University.

Dictionaries are among the many scholarly publications by the Sabha. The Hindi-śabdasāgara by Śyāmasundara Dāsa was first published 1916–1928, with a new edition published 1965–1975. The Sabha also organized and held the first All India Hindi Literature Conference.

== Key Activities ==
After its establishment, the committee began undertaking significant important tasks. A brief summary of its key activities over the years is as follows:

Official script and language: Before the establishment of the institution, English and Urdu were the official languages and Kaithi was the most popular script. Due to the efforts of the Sabha, notably Pandit Madan Mohan Malaviya, from 1900, the use of Nagari was allowed, and it became mandatory for government employees to know both Hindi and Urdu.

Advocacy for Devanagari in Courts: Pandit Malaviya took significant steps to ensure the implementation of Nagari in courts. The efforts included collecting signatures for a memorial petition, resulting in the introduction of Nagari in the courts and primary education of the North Western Provinces and Oudh by 1900.

Arya Bhasha Library: Established in 1896, this library is among the largest collections of Hindi literature in the country, housing rare manuscripts and printed books. It serves as an essential resource for Hindi scholars.

Manuscript Collection: From 1900, the Sabha began sending researchers to villages and towns to explore and preserve handwritten manuscripts that were at risk of being lost. Today, the organization holds over 20,000 manuscripts and 1.25 lakh books.

Publications: NPS has published books on various subjects, including Hindi literature and grammar. Notable publications include the Hindī Viśvakōṣa, Hindī Śabdasāgar, and works on famous poets like Surdas, Tulsidas, Kabirdas, Bihari, and Bhushan.

== Current Status ==
In recent times the institute has faced ongoing challenges, including a legal dispute concerning its officials. In January 2020, reports indicated that efforts by both the central and Uttar Pradesh governments aimed to revitalize were underway. The state government announced the establishment of the Bharatendu Academy, while the Ministry of Culture planned to preserve rare manuscripts, enhancing their presentation through a special initiative from the Indira Gandhi National Centre for the Arts.

In June 2021, the District Magistrate mandated the election of a new managing committee. However, this order was temporarily halted in July 2021 by the Allahabad High Court. The committee's voting took place on June 9, 2022, with the results being announced on April 6, 2023, when Vyomesh Shukla was elected as its Prime Minister.

Subsequently, the institute has carried out several key initiatives in publishing and preservation. It republished Ramchandra Shukla's Hindī Sāhitya kā Itihās in a critically edited new edition; reissued collections of poetry and older volumes in good condition with new bindings; and began efforts to preserve aging manuscripts, magazines, and newspapers that are at risk of deterioration.

== Sources ==
- Mody, Sujata Sudhakar (2008). Literature, Language, and Nation Formation: The Story of a Modern Hindi Journal 1900--1920. BiblioBazaar. ISBN 978-1-244-00086-5.
