= Ravindra Kaushik =

Indian espionage agent (1952–2001)

- Born: 11 April 1952; Sri Ganganagar, Rajasthan, India
- Died: November 2001 (aged 49); Central Jail Mianwali, Pakistan
- Known for: Spying for RAW
- Criminal charge: Espionage
- Criminal penalty: Life imprisonment
- Spouse: Amanat (m. 1976)
- Children: 1
- Espionage activity
- Allegiance: India
- Agency: Research and Analysis Wing
- Service years: 1975–1983
- Alias: Nabi Ahmed Shakir

Ravindra Kaushik (11 April 1952 – 21 November 2001) was an Indian Research and Analysis Wing agent who spied for India from 1973 until he was captured in 1983. Also known as 'The Black Tiger', Kaushik is considered one of India's greatest spies. He achieved the rank of “Major” in the Pakistani Army. He was exposed after a botched communication attempt by another operative. Arrested and interrogated, he was sentenced to death in 1985, later commuted to life imprisonment. He spent 16 years in various prisons and died in 2001 while incarcerated.

== Early life ==
Ravindra Kaushik was born in Sri Ganganagar, Rajasthan on 11 April 1952. His father, J. M. Kaushik, was an Indian Air Force officer; his mother Amla Devi died in 2006. He graduated from S. D. Bihani P. G. College, Sri Ganganagar, earning a B.Com. Kaushik was also involved with theatre acting and debates while in college when he was recruited by the Research and Analysis Wing (R&AW).

== Recruitment in the Research and Analysis Wing ==
Kaushik was trained in Delhi for two years to be an undercover operative in Pakistan. He was also trained to live as a Muslim and was taught the Urdu language. Being from Sri Ganganagar, a city near Rajasthan's border with Punjab, although he was native to Bagri, a local tonal language of Rajasthani, which is predominantly spoken in Sri Ganganagar and Hanumangarh districts, he was also well versed in Punjabi, which is widely spoken in Punjab, India and Pakistan as well. In 1975, at the age of 23, he was sent to Pakistan.

== Activities in Pakistan ==
Kaushik underwent circumcision and was given the cover name "Nabi Ahmed Shakir". After successfully getting admission in Karachi University, he completed his LL.B. After his graduation, he infiltrated Pakistan Military under a false identity and joined the Pakistan Army, where he was employed as a clerk in the Military Accounts Department, not as a commissioned officer. He married a local woman named Amaanat and fathered a boy, who died in 2001.

From 1979 to 1983, Kaushik worked as a Pakistani army clerk, sending valuable information to R&AW. He was given the title of 'The Black Tiger' by then Prime Minister of India Indira Gandhi.

== Death and aftermath ==
In September 1983, R&AW sent a low-level operative, Inyat Masih, to make contact with Kaushik. But Masih was exposed by the Joint Counter-Intelligence Bureau of Pakistan's Inter-Services Intelligence and blew Kaushik's cover. Kaushik was captured, and tortured for two years at an interrogation center in Sialkot. He was sentenced to death in 1985; his sentence was later commuted to a life term by the Supreme Court of Pakistan. He was kept in various jails in several cities, including Sialkot, Kot Lakhpat and in Mianwali jail, for 16 years. He managed to secretly send letters to his family in India, which revealed his poor health and the trauma he faced in Pakistani jails. In one of his letters, he wrote:

Is this what people who sacrifice their lives for a big country like India get?

In November 2001, he died of pulmonary tuberculosis and heart disease in Central Jail Mianwali in Pakistan. According to Kaushik's family, the Indian government had refused to recognise him and had made no effort to help him.

Kaushik's family claimed that the storyline of the Bollywood film Ek Tha Tiger released in 2012 was based on the life of Kaushik, and asked for credit in the movie titles for Kaushik. But the director, Kabir Khan, denied their claim.

== See also ==
- Sarabjit Singh
- Kashmir Singh
- Kulbhushan Jadhav
