= Kashmir Singh =

Indian RAW agent

Kashmir Singh (born 1941) was a former Indian spy. He spent 35 years in Pakistani prisons, before he received a presidential pardon from Pervez Musharraf.

== Early life ==
In his early life, he was in the Indian Army approximately from 1962 to 1966. After working for the Punjab Police for a while, he took up spying on a contractual basis at the rate of Rs. 400 per month. Thereafter, he entered Pakistan in the guise of Ibrahim, a Muslim name. Using this name, he checked into hotels and got identity cards during his task.

== Arrest ==
In 1973, he was arrested on the 22nd milestone on the Peshawar-Rawalpindi road by Pakistani intelligence officers. Upon arrest, he was accused of espionage and smuggling but it could not be proved by the authorities. At the time of his arrest, his family included his wife, Paramjit Kaur, and three children under the age of 10.

Subsequently, in the same year, he was sentenced to death by a Pakistan Army court. This verdict was upheld by a civil court between 1976 and 1977 and a mercy petition followed this, but to no avail. After being sentenced to an indefinite jail term, he said that he "was tortured third degree for the first few months by the authorities" as they pressured him to confess to being an Indian spy. Singh was lodged in seven different jails in Pakistan and was "kept in solitary confinement and remained chained for 17 long years." For the total period of three and a half decades in captivity, he did not see the sky or have a single visitor.

Singh's entire family, except for his wife Paramjit, had lost hope for his return. In 1986, when the Pakistan government released a few Indian prisoners accused of spying from the Lahore jail, the family knew that he was alive but on a death sentence.

== Release ==
In 2008, the caretaker human rights minister Ansar Burney spotted him while visiting the Lahore jail. Burney said that Singh became mentally disabled after his years in jail. He immediately put up his case with the Government of Pakistan and sought Singh's release. He further added that he had "fought his case on humanitarian grounds as he [Singh] had spent 35 years in jail."

On seeing this, President of Pakistan, Pervez Musharraf expressed shock and disbelief and accepted this mercy petition and ordered for release and repatriation of Singh to India.

On 4 March 2008, he was released by Pakistan and entered India through the Wagah border amidst celebrations.

== See also ==
- Sarabjit Singh
- Ravindra Kaushik
- Kulbhushan Yadav
