= Sarabjit Singh =

Indian convicted as a spy by Pakistan

- Born: Sarabjeet Singh; 1963 or 1964; Bhikhiwind, Punjab, India
- Died: 2 May 2013 (aged 49); Lahore, Punjab, Pakistan
- Spouse: Sukhpreet Kaur
- Children: 2
- Relatives: Dalbir Kaur (sister)
- Convictions: Espionage and terrorism
- Penalty: Death sentence

Sarabjit Singh (1963 or 1964 – 2 May 2013) (alleged to be Manjit Singh Rattu by Pakistan) was an Indian national convicted of terrorism and spying by a Pakistani court. He was tried and convicted by the Supreme Court of Pakistan for a series of bomb attacks in Lahore and Faisalabad that killed 14 bystanders in 1990. However, according to India, Sarabjit was a farmer who strayed into Pakistan from his village located on the border, three months after the bombings.

After a brief trial in the Lahore High Court (later directed to the Supreme Court), he was condemned and sentenced to death in 1991, but the sentence was repeatedly postponed by the Government of Pakistan. While in prison at Kot Lakhpat Jail, Lahore in April 2013, he was attacked by fellow inmates and died six days later at the Jinnah Hospital, Lahore.

On 14 April 2024, Singh's alleged murderer, Amir Sarfaraz Tamba, was attacked and killed by unknown masked gunmen near his home in Lahore.

== Background and family ==
Singh was born in Bhikhiwind, located along the Indo-Pakistani border in the Tarn Taran district of Punjab, India. He was fond of wrestling and taking care of rare pigeons. He worked as a farmer on other's fields. He was married to Sukhpreet Kaur and had two daughters Swapandeep and Poonam Kaur. His sister, Dalbir Kaur, was working towards his release since 1991 till his death in 2013.

However, another woman named Baljinder Kaur disputed Dalbir's relation to Singh and claimed to be Singh's real sister. According to Baljinder, Singh was the third eldest of ten siblings and Dalbir was not their sister, but had happened to know Singh since 1989; "Dalbir Kaur assured us she had right links and would struggle for the release of Sarabjit on some conditions. We trusted her and let her pursue the matter, only to be pushed out of the picture." Dalbir added that she had nothing to prove her relation with Singh except offering to undergo a DNA test. She also claimed that Singh's real brothers, Charanjit and Harbhajan, were not allowed to light his pyre at his funeral and were "pushed back" by people at the cremation ground. Commenting further on Dalbir, she added: "People have been coming to the fore (after Singh's death) for cheap publicity. They were nowhere when I alone struggled for his release."

== Arrest and prosecution ==
Sarabjit was caught on an unmarked Indo-Pakistani border area and arrested by the Pakistan Rangers near Kasur. Singh and his supporters claimed that the arrest was a case of mistaken identity. His sister said that the family launched a search but could not find any clue to his whereabouts for nine months. After a year they received a letter from Singh, informing them that he had been arrested in Pakistan as Ranjit Singh, as he had no identification papers and had been charged by the Lahore police in the bombings. He was convicted of spying and carrying out the bombings and was given the death penalty.

Some sources say there was an eight day gap between charges. He was accused of working for the Indian Research and Analysis Wing intelligence agency. He subsequently confessed on camera to the bombings.

It was later reported that Ranjit Singh was later apprehended in Canada, and later in Chandigarh in India.

=== Death sentence ===
In 1991 Singh was given the death sentence under Pakistan's Army Act. His sentence was upheld by the High Court Division and later by the Appeallate Division. The Supreme Court dismissed a petition to review his death sentence in March 2006 as Singh's lawyers failed to appear for the hearing. Singh said that his appeal had been dismissed by the Pakistan Supreme Court only because of lack of interest by his former lawyer.

=== Issues with prosecution ===
An Indian origin British lawyer, Jas Uppal, campaigning for his release, pointed to several problems with the prosecution in the trial.

== After conviction ==
On 26 April 2008, the key witness Shaukat Salim retracted his statement during an interview with journalists. Salim's father and other relatives had been killed in the bombing. In court Salim testified that Singh had planted the bomb but later said that he made that statement under pressure from the police. Singh's lawyer, Abdul Rana Hamid, said that Salim's statements had no legal standing as they were never recorded in court.

Five of his mercy petitions were rejected by the courts and the President of Pakistan, but in 2008 the government nonetheless put off Singh's execution indefinitely.

=== Presidential pardon ===
On 27 June 2012, both Pakistani and international media reported President Asif Ali Zardari signed a document sent by the interior ministry of Pakistan commuting Singh's death sentence to life in prison. A life sentence in Pakistan generally lasts 14 years. Singh, having spent 22 years in jail, was therefore to be released. The news of his pardon and imminent release initiated celebrations in his hometown. The Indian foreign minister also issued a statement of appreciation to Islamabad for the gesture.

Right-wing political groups Jamaat-e-Islami and Jamaat-ud-Da'wah condemned this. Later that day, after media agencies in both Pakistan and India had reported on a commuted sentence and pending release for Singh, the Pakistani government announced that the name of the prisoner to be released would be Surjeet Singh, not Sarabjit Singh. Surjeet Singh was arrested on charges of spying by the Pakistani security officials. Indian government, however, denied that Surjeet Singh was a spy.

Regarding the confusion related to Sarabjit-Surjeet mix-up, Surjeet Singh said that similar Urdu spellings of both the names led to the confusion. Surjeet also said that Indian prisoners are treated well in Pakistani jails and they are provided with basic necessities. BBC News reported that in recent years, several Indians returning from Pakistani jails have admitted that they have been maliciously framed by the Pakistani Intelligence for spying for India. Some have criticised India's government for abandoning them.

Five hours later the Pakistani government issued a statement denying the reports and holding the media responsible for the confusion. They announced that the release order had been for another prisoner, Surjeet Singh, who was pardoned in 1989. Sarabjit's family condemned the incident as a "cruel joke".

Singh filed a new mercy appeal to the President of Pakistan on the 65th independence day of that country.

=== Efforts for release ===
On 23 August 2005, Singh's case was taken up in both houses of the Indian Parliament, where the government was asked to take action for his release.

In March 2008, Singh's family went to Pakistan for his scheduled execution. They met several prominent Pakistani politicians, including former Prime minister Nawaz Sharif to appeal for his release. Sharif said, "After seeing the plight of the members of Sarabjit's family who have come to Pakistan, any person can feel the pain they are going through." However, Sharif added that he should be released on the condition that India would send him back to Pakistan if further evidence was found against him.

The Indian External Affairs Minister K. Natwar Singh took up Sarabjit Singh's case with the Pakistan High Commissioner Aziz Ahmed Khan and urged him to convey Delhi's hope that Islamabad would treat the matter as a humanitarian issue.

==== Mercy petitions ====
After his conviction in 1991, several mercy petitions were filed by Singh's lawyers. The fifth petition was filed on 28 May 2012 along with 100,000 signatures collected from India. None of the mercy petitions were granted.

==== Free Sarabjit campaign ====
In 2009 British lawyer Jas Uppal started an online campaign "freesarabjitsingh.com" Awais Sheikh, Singh's Pakistani lawyer, supported the campaign.

Hai gham ki usska wahan koi meet nahin hai
Yeh sabki ghuzarish hai koi geet nahin hai
Ghalati se jisko aapne rakhaa hai pakadke
Woh shaqs Sarabjit Manjit nahin hai.

— Raza Murad in a couplet supporting Sarabjt's release.

Bollywood actor and activist Raza Murad also campaigned for his release. As of June 2012, he had 138,226 signatures. The campaign continued after the Pakistani government's reversal regarding Singh's release in June 2012.

In June 2012, Bollywood actor Salman Khan came forward to seek support from people and media for the release of Sarabjit. He also started an online petition from his NGO Being Human in support of his release.

=== Protests ===
In April 2008, a group of Pakistani students organised a march seeking withdrawal of all official moves to pardon Singh.

== Death ==
Singh was attacked on 26 April 2013 at about 4:30 pm in the Central Jail Lahore (Kot Lakhpat jail), by other prisoners, with bricks, sharp metal sheets, iron rods and blades. He was admitted to Jinnah Hospital, Lahore in critical condition with severe head injuries, in a coma, with a broken backbone. He was placed on a ventilator. The exact circumstances of the attack and the number of attackers have been differently reported. Some sources have indicated that there were six assailants whereas others have indicated two. Some indicated that he was assaulted in his cell; others indicated that the attack took place when he was brought out of his cell for an hour-long break. According to his sister, the attack on Singh was pre-planned and the jail authorities were involved. His wife, sister and two daughters were allowed to visit him in the hospital.

Singh had been threatened after Afzal Guru was executed in India in February 2013 over his role in the 2001 Indian Parliament attack case. Some sources had indicated that the attack was planned after Guru's execution. The Indian prime minister, Manmohan Singh, termed the attack as "very sad". On 29 April 2013, India appealed to Pakistan to release Sarabjit Singh on humanitarian grounds or at least allow him to be provided medical treatment in India, but these were repeatedly rejected by Pakistan. Appeals by lawyers were also filed with the Supreme Court of Pakistan to send Singh for medical treatment to the UK or outside Pakistan to save his life.

On 1 May 2013 he was declared brain dead by doctors at Jinnah Hospital, but Pakistani authorities refused to give a statement. His sister and family returned to India. His sister said that the doctors attending to her brother were not being honest with them and she suspected foul play. She also remarked to having seen ink on his left thumb and that the Pakistani doctors had been evading questions.

On 2 May 2013, he was reported to have died at 12:45 am local time in Lahore, when he was removed from the ventilator support after his condition worsened towards the middle of the night. His body was brought to India by a special aircraft the same evening. Indian doctors claimed that the second postmortem revealed that vital organs were missing from his body. An autopsy also revealed that his skull was broken into two pieces. They were, however, waiting for the report of the first postmortem conducted in Pakistan.

== Aftermath ==
The Government of Punjab, India declared a three-day period of mourning over Singh's death and announced it would pay his descendants a compensation of Rs 1,00,00,000.

== Published accounts ==
=== Film ===
A biographical film called Sarabjit was produced by Vashu Bhagnani (among others) and directed by Omung Kumar. Actress Aishwarya Rai essayed the role of Singh's sister, Dalbir Kaur, while, Randeep Hooda and Richa Chada played the role of Sarbjit Singh and his wife, Sukhpreet, respectively. The film was narrated through the perspective of Sarbjit Singh's sister Dalbir Kaur and was released on 20 May 2016 in India; the Censor board of Pakistan banned the film for being "anti-Pakistani".

== See also ==
- Ravindra Kaushik, RAW spy imprisoned in Pakistan
- Kashmir Singh, Indian spy imprisoned in Pakistan
- Kulbhushan Jadhav, Indian Navy Ex-Officer detained for espionage and terrorism in Balochistan
- Sanaullah Haq
