= Chintamani Ghosh =

Indian publisher and printer (1844–1928)

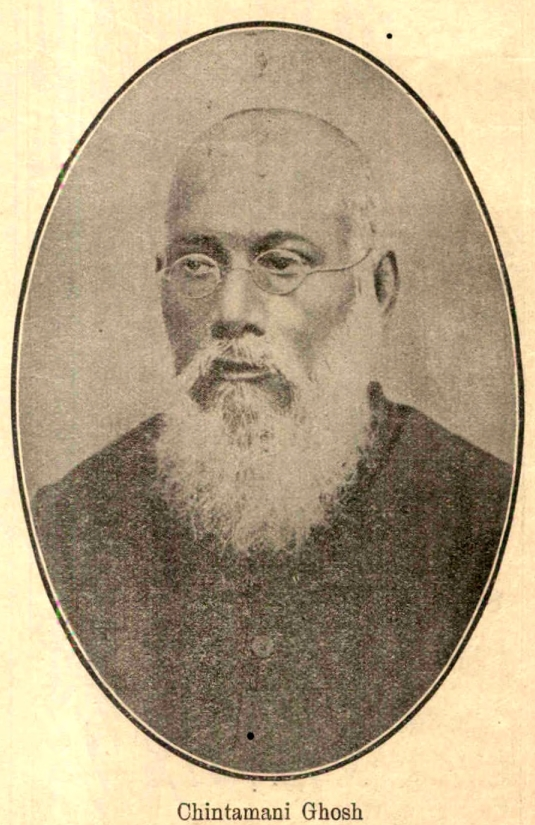
- Born: c. 1844; Howrah, Bengal Presidency, British India
- Died: 11 August 1928
- Occupations: Printer; Publisher

Chintamani Ghosh (c. 1844 – August 11, 1928) was an Indian publisher and printer. He founded The Indian Press, in Allahabad and started Saraswati, the first Hindi magazine, in 1900. He was considered as Caxton of the Hindi world.

== Life ==
Chintamani Ghosh was born in Howrah, West Bengal, in 1844. He received his education in Varanasi, where his father was transferred due to his job. Chintamani Ghosh started his career by joining as a government employee. In 1884, he established The Indian Press, in Allahabad. Notable magazines such as Prabasi and The Modern Review used to be printed here. He was one of the earliest promoters and publishers of Rabindranath Tagore's literary works.

Ghosh died on 11 August 1928.

== Legacy ==
Chintamani Ghosh was noted as Caxton of the Hindi world. In 2013, the then Indian president Pranab Mukherjee unveiled a statue of Ghosh in Allahabad.
