= Saraswati (magazine) =

First Hindi monthly magazine of India

- Former editors: Mahavir Prasad Dwivedi (1903–1920), Padumlal Punnalal Bakshi, Thakur Srinath Singh, Devidutta Shukl
- Categories: Literary magazine
- Frequency: Monthly
- Publisher: Indian Press
- Founder: Chintamani Ghosh
- First issue: 1 January 1900
- Country: India
- Based in: Allahabad
- Language: Hindi

Saraswati was the first Hindi monthly magazine of India. Founded in 1900, by Chintamani Ghosh, the proprietor of Indian Press, in Allahabad, its success under the editorship of littérateur Mahavir Prasad Dwivedi (1903–1920), led to flourishing of modern Hindi prose and poetry especially in Khariboli dialect. It became the most influential periodical in the Hindi literature during the first two decades of the 20th century.

== History ==
Based in Georgetown, Allahabad, Ghosh founded Indian Press in 1884, mainly to publish educational books, though gradually shifted to publishing general interest books. However, Ghosh didn't have much experience in publishing literary works. Thus in late 1899, he wrote to Nagari Pracharini Sabha in Varanasi, which worked for promotion of Devnagari script, seeking help with editor and writers for founding a literary Hindi magazine. Eventually, first issue of Saraswati was published on 1 January 1900. The other famous Hindi publications of Indian press was children's magazine Balsakha, weekly newspaper "Deshdoot", magazines for farmers "Hal" etc.

Indian Press was also the earliest promoters and publisher of Rabindranath Tagore's work, including Geetanjali, whose rights he held till 1922 before transferring it to Viswa Bharati University. Dwivedi, the doyen of modern Hindi literature, remained its editors from 1903 to 1920, and provided a platform for upcoming writers in Hindi, where many writers of repute, including Premchand and Maithili Sharan Gupt got published. Through the magazine, he not only gave a new direction to Hindi literature by bringing in his social reformist agenda, but also exerted his lasting influence of the formation of style and sensibility during this twenty-year period of Hindi literature. Today it is known as "Dwivedi Yuga" (Age of Dwivedi) after him. Other eminent editors of Saraswati were Padumlal Punnalal Bakshi of Rajnandgaon, Thakur Srinath Singh and Devidutt Shukl.

In 2013, President of India, Pranab Mukherjee while unveiling a statue Ghosh at Jagat Taran Girls' Inter College, Allahabad, remembered his "great contribution towards promoting Hindi language and literature."

Saraswati folded in 1975. It was revived in 2020 and is now being published by Indian Press. In 2020 Devendra Shukla was appointed its editor. In January 2022 Ravi Nandan Singh and Anupam Parihar were appointed editor of the magazine.

== Bibliography ==
- Freitag, Sandria B. (1992). Culture and Power in Banaras: Community, Performance, and Environment, 1800-1980. University of California Press. ISBN 978-0-520-08094-2.
- Ruhela, Giriraj Shah Satya Pal (2003). Glory Of Indian Culture. Diamond Pocket Books (P) Ltd. ISBN 978-81-7182-592-9.
- Kumar, Krishan (2005). Political Agenda of Education: A Study of Colonialist and Nationalist Ideas. SAGE Publications. ISBN 978-0-7619-3316-8.
- Das, Sisir Kumar (1995). History of Indian Literature: 1911-1956, struggle for freedom : triumph and tragedy. Sahitya Akademi. ISBN 978-81-7201-798-9.
- Mody, Sujata Sudhakar (2008). Literature, Language, and Nation Formation: The Story of a Modern Hindi Journal 1900--1920. ISBN 978-1-109-10083-9.
