= Meitei cinema =

Meitei cinema Maniwood
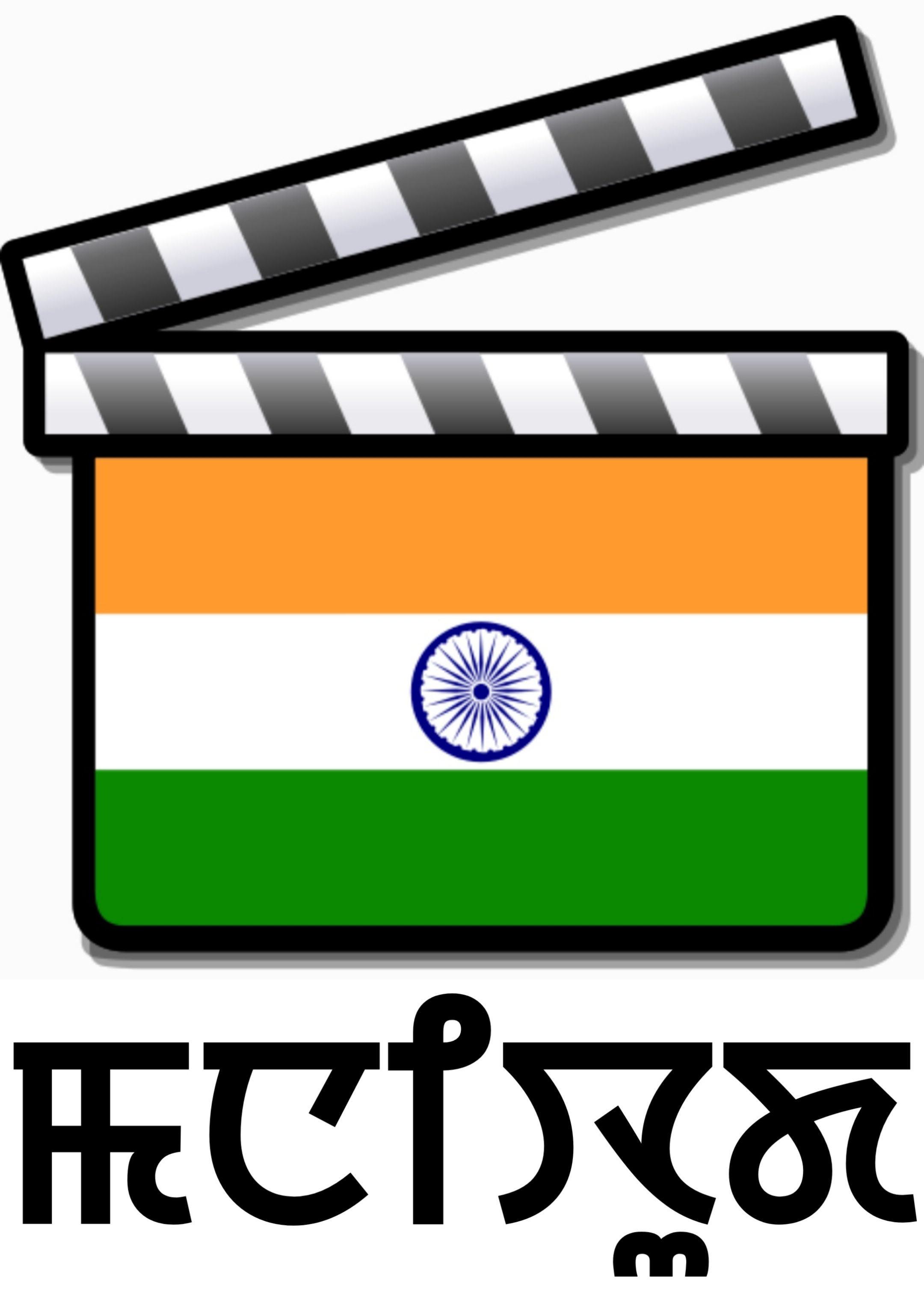
- An illustration of the Maniwood clapperboard
- Main distributors: Film Forum Manipur (FFM); Manipur State Film Development Society (MSFDS)

Produced feature films
- Total: 60-70

Meitei cinema (Meitei: Meitei Mami Kumhei), also known as Maniwood, is the segment of Indian cinema dedicated to the production of motion pictures in the Meitei language (officially called Manipuri language), widely spoken in the state of Manipur. The popular term Maniwood, is a portmanteau of "Manipuri" (official name of Meitei) and "Hollywood". Since its inception, Meitei cinema has played a significant role in the Meitei linguistic purism movement, often emphasizing proper Meitei language in place of pidgin dialects.

The origins of Meitei cinema date back to Matamgi Manipur (Meitei for 'Today's Manipur'), released in 1972 as the first full-length Meitei-language film and the first film made in Manipur. The film won the President's Medal at the 20th National Film Awards, establishing a milestone in Manipuri cinema. Another landmark came with Imagi Ningthem (Meitei for 'My Son, My Precious') in 1981, which brought international recognition by winning the Golden Montgolfiere at the 1982 Festival des 3 Continents in Nantes, elevating Indian cinema on the global stage.

In 1990, Ishanou (Meitei for 'The Chosen One') gained further acclaim, being screened in the Un Certain Regard section at the 1991 Cannes Film Festival. This film was re-recognized in 2023 by Cannes as a "World Classic," marking its significance as the only Indian film selected for the event that year. Additionally, Keibu Keioiba (Meitei for 'Tiger-Head') became the first animation film in the Meitei language and in Manipuri cinema in 2009.

Reflecting local culture, since 2012, Maniwood has observed a dress code guideline: “If you wear jeans thrice on screen, you have to wear Manipuri dresses four times.” This practice reflects the Maniwood culture’s dedication to representing the Manipuri lifestyle and traditional attire. According to acclaimed director Aribam Syam Sharma, Meitei cinema authentically portrays the way of life and thinking of the Manipuri people.

Today, Ishanou, Oneness, and Eikhoigi Yum are among the top-rated Manipuri films on IMDb as of 2023, showcasing the enduring appeal of Meitei cinema among audiences.

== History ==
=== Era of celluloid classic feature films (1972-1989) ===
Year	Original Title (in Meitei script)	Romanization	Director	Producer	Banner	Format	Note(s)/Reference(s)
1972	ꯃꯇꯝꯒꯤ ꯃꯅꯤꯄꯨꯔ	Matamgee Manipur	Deb Kumar Bose	K. Manimohan	T.K. Films Private Ltd.	35mm Black and White	
1973	ꯕ꯭ꯔꯣꯖꯦꯟꯗ꯭ꯔꯣ ꯒꯤ ꯂꯨꯍꯣꯡꯕ	Brojendra Gee Luhongba	S.N. Chand	S.N. Chand	Sajatia Pictures	35mm Black and White	
1974	ꯂꯝꯖꯥ ꯄꯔꯁꯨꯔꯥꯝ	Lamja Parsuram	Aribam Syam Sharma	G. Narayan Sharma	N.S. Films	35mm Black and White	
1974	ꯉꯛ-ꯏ-ꯀꯣ ꯅꯪꯁꯦ	Ngak-E-Ko Nangse	S.N. Chand	W. Basant Kumar	Poonam Films	35mm Black and White	
1976	ꯁꯥꯐꯕꯤ	Shaphabee	Aribam Syam Sharma	G. Narayan Sharma	N.S. Films	35mm Black and White	
1979	ꯈꯨꯊꯥꯡ ꯂꯝꯖꯦꯜ	Khuthang Lamjel	G.C. Tongbra	Th. Haridas	A.T. Films	35mm Black and White (some parts were colour)	
1979	ꯑꯣꯂꯥꯡꯊꯥꯒꯤ ꯋꯥꯡꯃꯗꯁꯨ	Olangthagee Wangmadasoo	Aribam Syam Sharma	G. Narayan Sharma	N.S. Films	35mm Black and White	
1981	ꯏꯃꯥꯒꯤ ꯅꯤꯡꯊꯦꯝ	Imagee Ningthem	Aribam Syam Sharma	K. Ibohal Sharma	X-Cine Productions	16mm Converted to 35mm blowup (Black and White)	
1981	ꯈꯣꯟꯖꯦꯜ	Khonjel	M.Nilamani	M.Nilamani	Anjana Films	35mm Black and White	
1981	ꯋꯥꯡꯃ ꯋꯥꯡꯃ	Wangma Wangma	L. Banka Sharma	L. Shyamsundar	Eastern Star Films	35mm Black and White	
1983	ꯁꯅꯥꯀꯩꯊꯦꯜ	Sanakeithel	M.A. Singh	Doren Thoudam	A.T.B. Films International (India)	35mm Black and White	
1984	ꯂꯥꯡꯂꯦꯟ ꯊꯥꯗꯣꯏ	Langlen Thadoi	M.A. Singh	Kh. Shakhi Devi	Kay Pee Films International (India)	16mm Convert-ed to 35mm blowup (Colour)	
1984	ꯌꯥꯏꯔꯤꯄꯣꯛ ꯊꯝꯕꯥꯜꯅꯨ	Yairipok Thambalnu	L. Banka Sharma	H. Gehendra	Liberty Films	35mm Black and White	
1987	ꯏꯆꯦ ꯁꯈꯤ	Eche Shakhi	Doren Thoudam & H. Ibotombi	Doren Thoudam	A.T.B. Films International (India)	16mm Converted to 35mm blowup Colour	
1989	ꯀꯣꯝꯕꯤꯔꯩ	Kombirei	G. Narayan Sharma	G. Narayan Sharma	N.S. Films	35mm Colour	

== Cast and crew ==
=== Actors ===
- Oken Amakcham
- Gokul Athokpam
- Gurumayum Bonny
- Shougrakpam Hemanta
- Kaiku Rajkumar
- Priyakanta Laishram
- Makhonmani Mongsaba
- Lairenjam Olen
- Hamom Sadananda
- Bijou Thaangjam
- Chinglen Thiyam
- Bonium Thokchom
- Kangabam Tomba

=== Actresses ===
- Maya Choudhury
- Leishangthem Tonthoingambi
- Abenao Elangbam
- Bala Hijam
- Lin Laishram
- Soma Laishram
- Manda Leima
- Sushmita Mangsatabam
- Biju Ningombam
- Kshetrimayum Rashi
- Yengkhom Roma
- Kamala Saikhom
- Huirem Seema
- Tara

=== Directors ===
- Oken Amakcham
- Homen D' Wai
- Oinam Gautam Singh
- Romi Meitei
- Makhonmani Mongsaba
- Haobam Paban Kumar
- Aribam Syam Sharma
- Bobby Wahengbam
- Priyakanta Laishram

== Awards ==
=== Manipur State Film Awards (MSFA) ===
- Manipur State Film Awards 2022
- Manipur State Film Awards 2023
- Manipur State Film Awards 2024
- Manipur State Film Awards 2025

=== Manipur Film Awards (MANIFA) ===
- MANIFA 2020
- MANIFA 2022
- MANIFA 2025

== Bilingualism ==
Many Meitei language films have been made with other languages simultaneously.

=== Meitei and English ===
Year	Title	Director(s)	Ref
2011	Fried Fish, Chicken Soup and a Premiere Show	Mamta Murthy	
2013	Manipuri Pony (film)	Aribam Syam Sharma	
2018	Who Said Boys Can't Wear Makeup?	Priyakanta Laishram	
2024	Oneness (film)	Priyakanta Laishram	

=== Meitei and Japanese ===
Year	Title	Director(s)	Ref
2015	My Japanese Niece	Mohen Naorem	

=== Meitei and Portuguese ===
Year	Meitei Title	Portuguese Title	Director(s)	Ref
2017	Nura Pakhang	Eu e Tu	Romi Meitei	

=== Meitei and Tamil ===
Year	Title	Director(s)	Ref
1996	Language of War	R.V. Ramani	

=== Meitei and Tangkhul ===
Year	Title	Director(s)	Ref
2021	Nine Hills One Valley	Haobam Paban Kumar	

== See also ==
- List of Meitei-language television channels
- List of Meitei-language newspapers
- Kollywood
