= Meitei people =

Ethnic group of South Asia

Meitei people (Manipuri people)
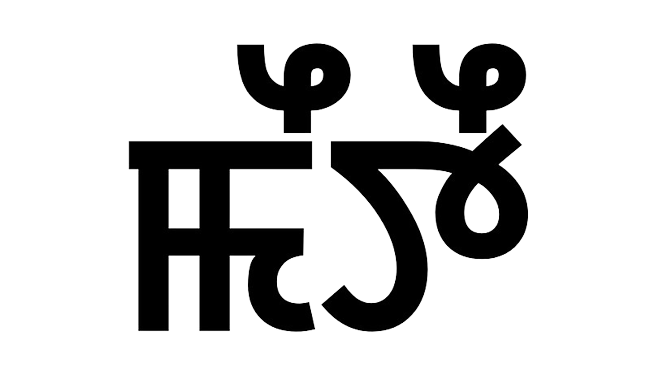

- Cultural flag of the Meitei people

Total population
- 1,800,000+ (2011)

Regions with significant populations
- India: 1,760,913
- Manipur: 1,522,132
- Assam: 168,127
- Tripura: 23,779
- Nagaland: 9,511
- Meghalaya: 4,451
- Arunachal Pradesh: 2,835
- Mizoram: 2,242
- Myanmar: 25,000
- Bangladesh: 15,000

Languages
- Meitei language (officially known as Manipuri language)

Religion
- Majority: Hinduism (predominantly Vaishnavism); Minority: Sanamahism, Christianity, Buddhism

Related ethnic groups
- Bamars, Chin, Kachin, Meitei Pangals, Tripuri, Nagas, other Tibeto-Burman groups

The Meitei people, also known as Meetei people, are a Tibeto-Burman ethnic group native to the Indian State of Manipur. They form the largest and dominant ethnic group of Manipur in Northeast India. They speak the Meitei language (officially called Manipuri), one of the 22 official languages of the Republic of India and the sole official language of government of Manipur. The Meiteis primarily settle in the Imphal Valley region of modern-day Manipur, though a sizeable population has settled in the other Indian states of Assam, Tripura, Nagaland, Meghalaya, and Mizoram. There is also a notable presence of Meiteis in the neighbouring countries of Myanmar and Bangladesh. The Meiteis represent about 53% of Manipur's population, according to the 2011 census.

== Endonyms and exonyms ==
The Meitei are known by a number of endonyms, Meitei, Meetei, Meithei (Meitei), and as well as by numerous exonyms, such as Meckley, Manipuri, and Kathaeh or Kathay (Burmese: ကသည်း). The term Manipuri is widely used, but problematic because of its ambiguous scope: next to being a synonym for Meitei/Meetei, it can also refer in a wider sense to the native ethnic groups in the hills of Manipur.

== Geographical distribution ==
=== India ===
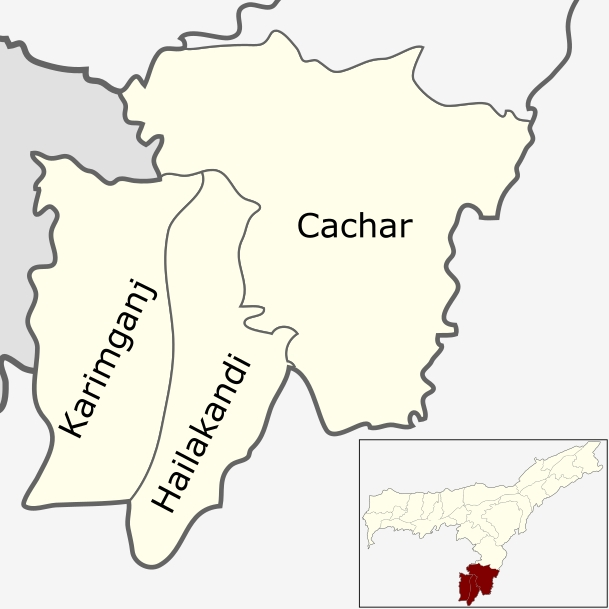
Districts of Barak Valley – Meitei speaking population settlement areas of Assam

As per the 2011 census, there 1,761,079 Meitei language-speakers in India.

The vast majority of them (1,522,132 people, 86 percent of the total) are in the state of Manipur, which is also their place of origin. Estimated 239,836 people of this population are Meitei Pangals. The remainder, 1,353,999 people, are ethnic Meiteis. (Note: The number 239,936 is that of Muslim population of the state of Manipur, the majority of whom are expected to be Meitei Pangals.)

A significant number (168,133 people, 9.5 percent) of Meitei language speakers are in the state of Assam. In the Barak Valley region of Assam, Meitei people are the third largest ethnic group, after Bengalis and Hindi speakers.

=== Myanmar ===
Myanmar has a significant population of Meitei people in Kachin state, Yangon Region, Sagaing Region, Shan state, Ayeyarwady Region, among others.

=== Bangladesh ===
The population of Meiteis are found in four districts of Sylhet Division in Bangladesh, namely Sylhet District (thirteen villages), Moulvibazar District (twenty-eight villages), Sunamganj District (three villages) and Habiganj District (four villages). In early times, there were Meitei population in Dhaka, Mymensingh and Comilla too.

=== United Kingdom ===
The European Manipuri Association (EMA), which works to unite members of the Manipuri diaspora across Europe, was founded in Sheffield on 23 September 2001. The association has marked Ningol Chakouba in the UK, in Kent in 2015 and in Hertfordshire in 2024.

== Origins and history ==
"The beginning of this old Manipuri literature (as in the case of Newari) may go back to 1500 years, or even 2000 years, from now."

— Suniti Kumar Chatterji, Padma Vibhushan awardee Indian scholar

The earliest sections of the Cheitharol Kumbaba, a Meitei chronicle, record the gradual spread of Meiteis across Kangleipak (Meitei for 'Manipur') and their assimilation of other clans (also known as Yek Salai) into a confederacy.

=== In Kangleipak (Manipur) ===
In 1100 CE, Loyumba Shinyen (Old Manipuri: ꯂꯣꯌꯨꯝꯄ ꯁꯤꯟꯌꯦꯟ, romanized: Loyumpa Shinyen), an ancient Meitei language constitution was written and regulated under the supervision of Meitei King Loiyumba (Loyumba) (1074 CE-1112 CE) in the Ancient Kangleipak (early Manipur). It is a formal proclamation of the proto-constitution which was drafted in 429 CE by Meitei King Naophangba. The idea of its constitutionalism was functional until it was substituted by the Manipur State Constitution Act 1947.

=== In Myanmar (Burma) ===
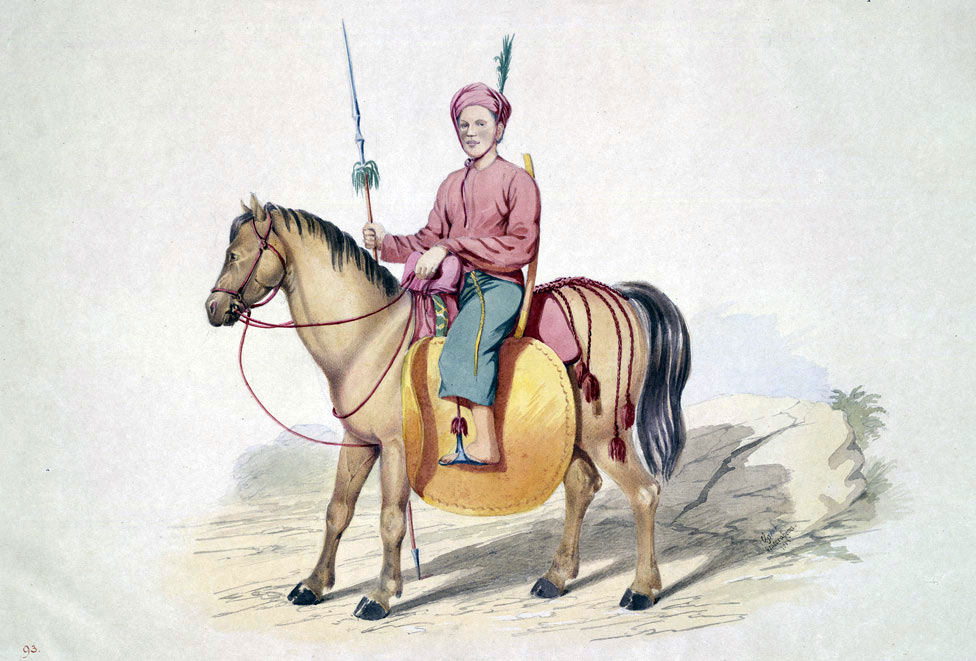
An 1855 watercolour of a Kathe horseman in the Burmese royal service

Myanmar is home to a sizeable community of Meiteis, who are called Kathe in Burmese. Unlike other Hindu communities in Myanmar, the Meitei resemble other Burmese ethnic groups in terms of physical appearance, which has accelerated their assimilation and integration into Burmese society. In the early 1950s, Burmese Meiteis numbered approximately 40,000, with one-third of them residing in Mandalay. Current estimates are approximately 25,000. Meiteis have resettled throughout the country, including in villages near Myitkyina to the north, Homalin, Kalewa, Pyay, in the center of the country, and Yangon to the south. They continue to practice Hinduism in Myanmar.

As a result of wars between the Meitei kingdom and the Konbaung dynasty between the 17th and 18th centuries, many Meiteis were resettled in the Burmese kingdom. Some Meitei settlements in modern-day Myanmar originate from the 1758–1759 war, and from the Burmese occupation of Manipur from 1819 to 1826. Alaungpaya, during the former campaign, resettled Meiteis in Sagaing and Amarapura. The Meitei people's horsemanship skills were employed in the Burmese royal army, where they formed the elite Cassay cavalry (ကသည်းမြင်းတပ်) and artillery regiments (ကသည်းအမြောက်တပ်) which were employed during the Burmese–Siamese wars. The Burmese court also retained a retinue of Manipuri Brahmins called Bamons, also called Kathe Ponna (ကသည်းပုဏ္ဏား) to advise and conduct court rituals.

== Language and writing systems ==
The Meitei people speak the Meitei language (also known as the Manipuri language or Meiteilon), a Tibeto-Burman language. The Meitei language is one of the languages with legal status in India, and was included in the Eighth Schedule to the Constitution of India in 1992.

There are many Meitei language movements, including classical language movement (predominantly in Manipur), associate official language movement (in Assam), linguistic purism movement (predominantly in Manipur), etc.

Historically and then after a long gap, presently, Meitei was written in the indigenous Meitei mayek script. The script was replaced by an alphabet based on the Bengali script in the early 18th century. The Meitei Mayek script has seen a revival in recent decades, and is now seen in street signs, schools, newspapers, and legislative proceeding records.

=== Literature ===
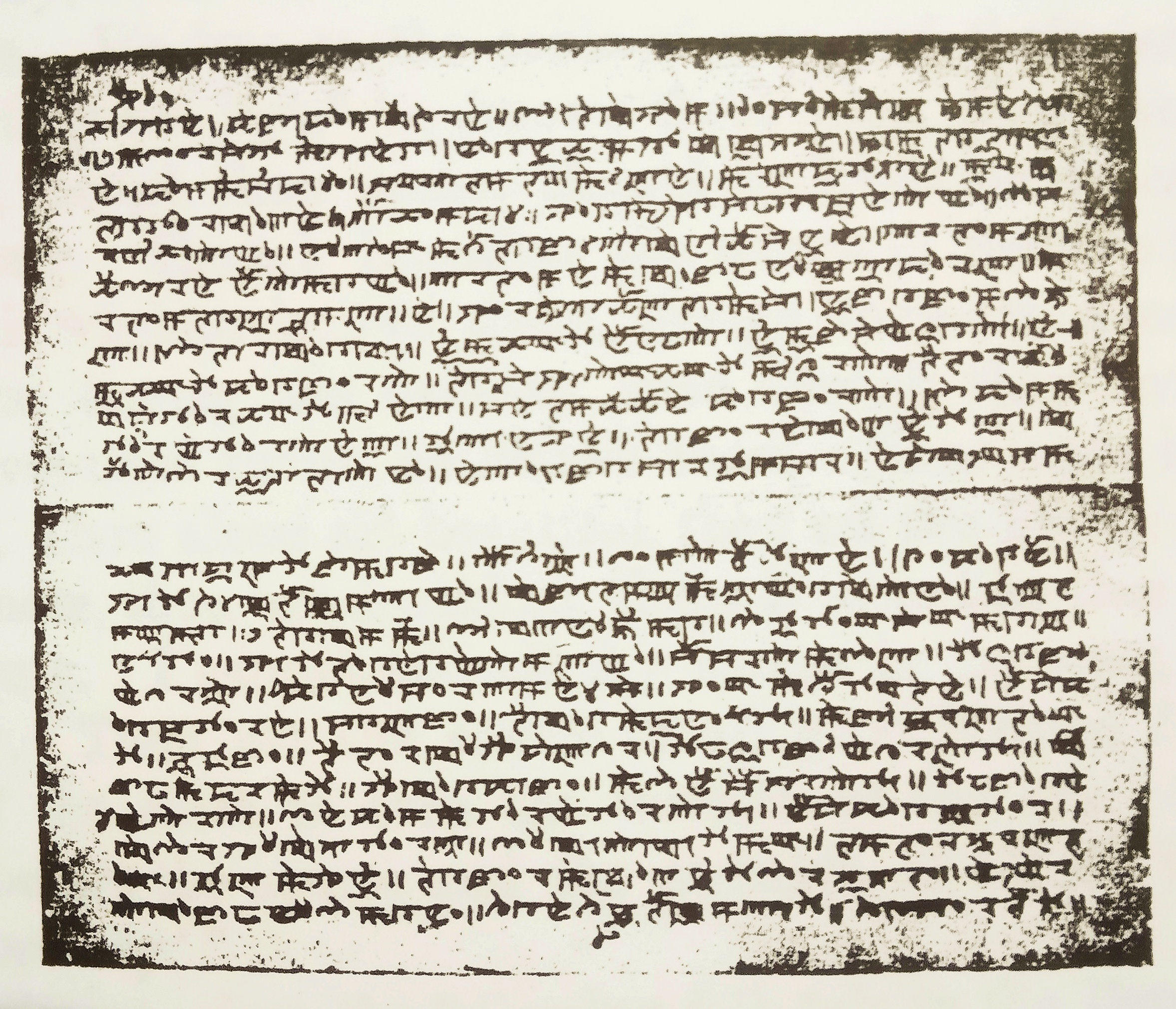
The Numit Kappa, a Meitei epic composed around 33CE.

Among the heritage of diverse literary works in Meitei literature, the Khamba Thoibi Sheireng (Meitei: ꯈꯝꯕ ꯊꯣꯏꯕꯤ ꯁꯩꯔꯦꯡ, lit. 'poem on Khamba Thoibi')), is regarded as the national epic of the Manipuris. It is an epic poem based on the ancient romantic adventure tale of Khamba and Thoibi. It is the best known magnum opus of Hijam Anganghal Singh. It is often considered to be the greatest of all the Meitei epic poems. At 39,000 verses, it is the longest Indian epic just after the Mahabharata and the Ramayana.

== Culture ==
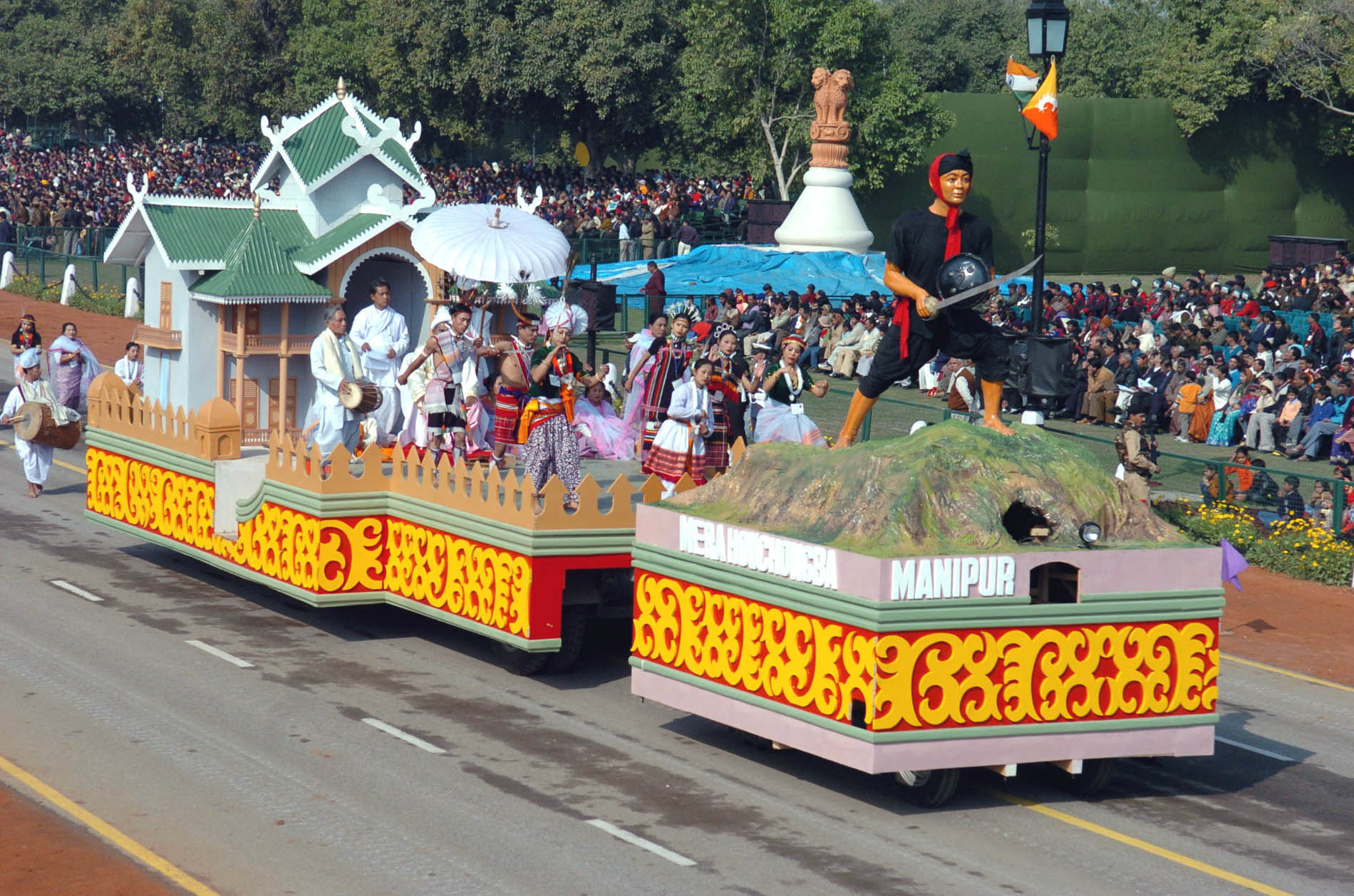
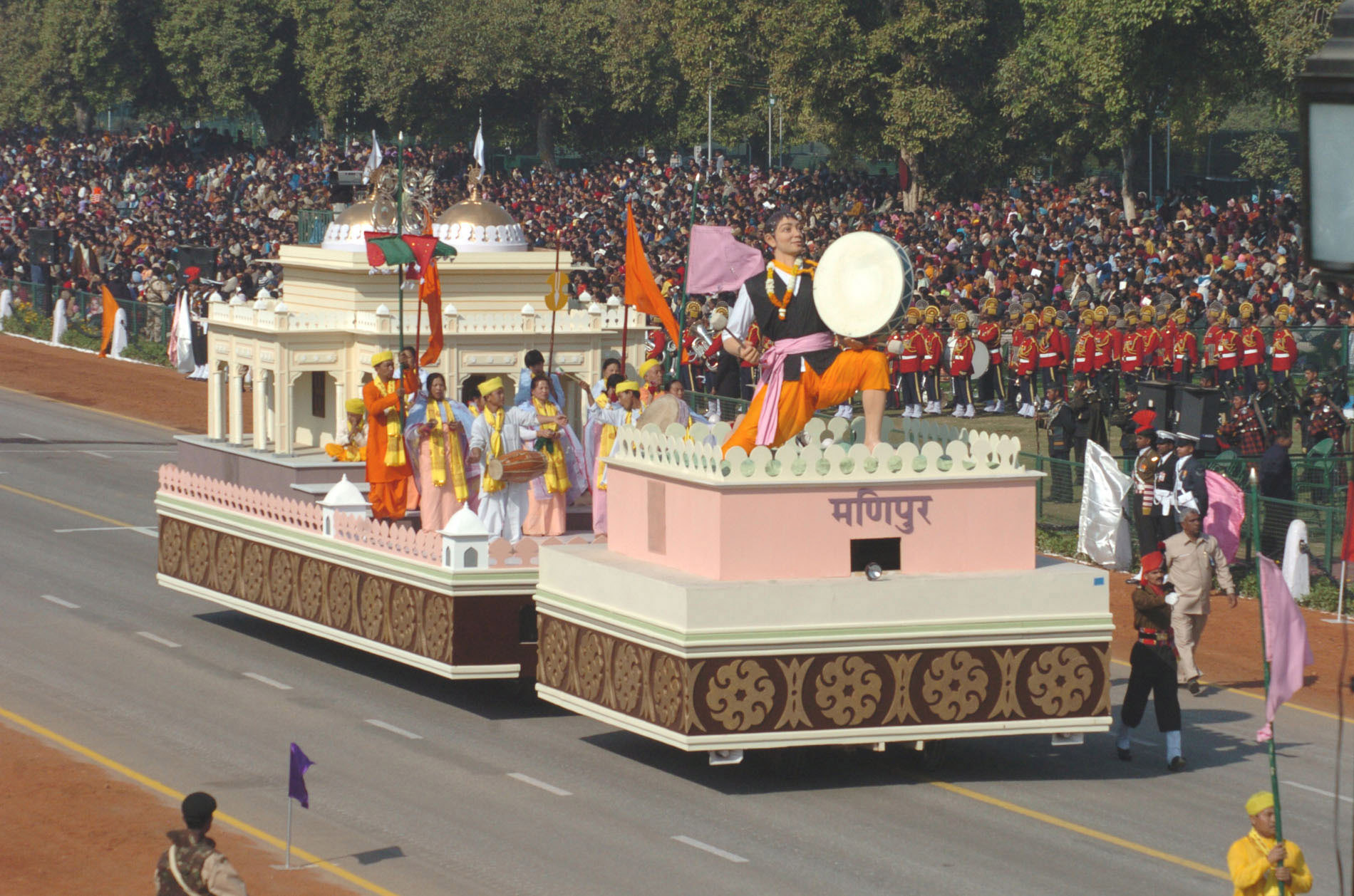
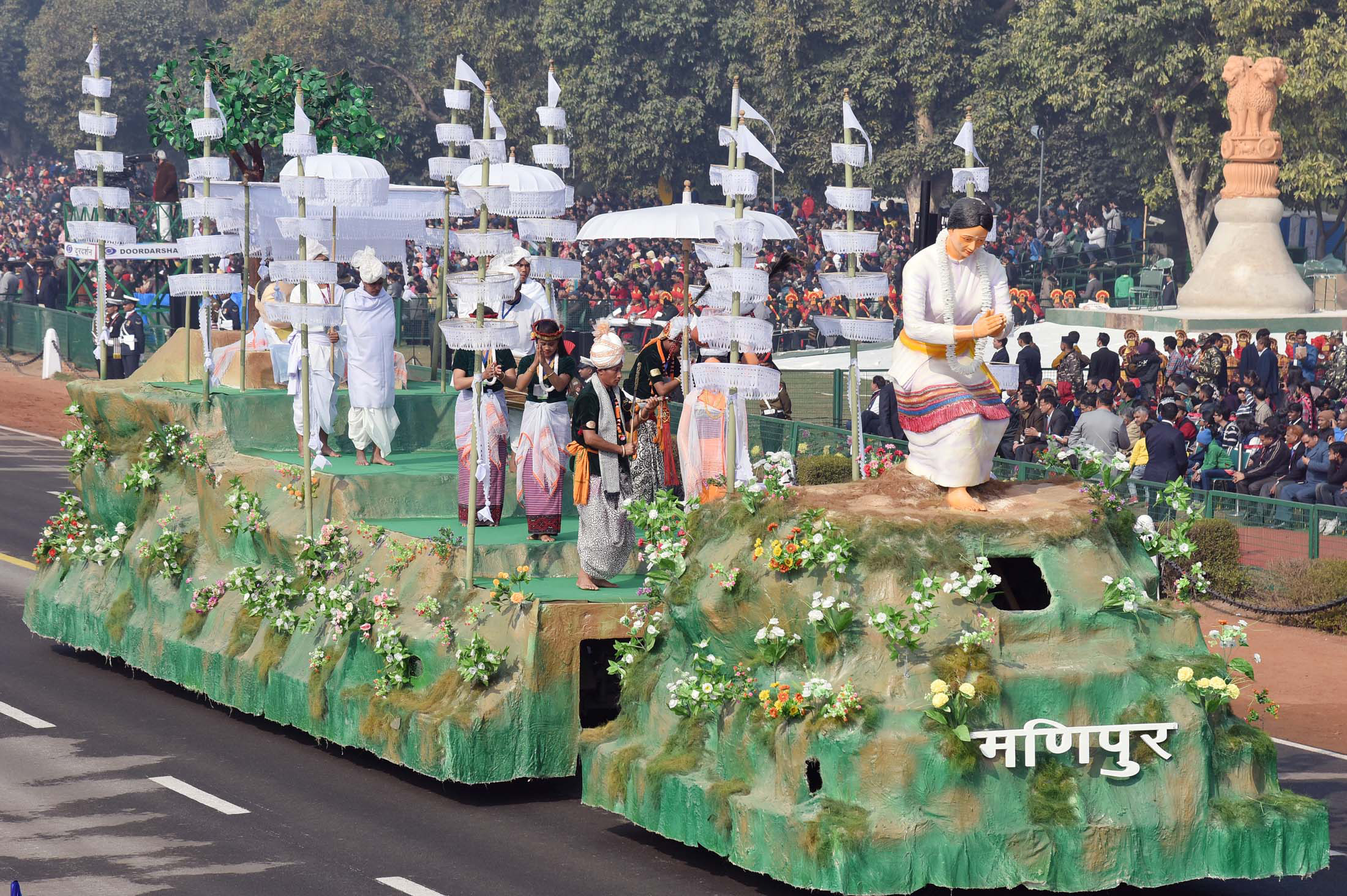
The Republic of India honouring and showcasing the cultural heritage of the Meiteis (clockwise from the top): Kangla Fort, Thang-Ta and the composite culture of Kangleipak (Meitei for 'Manipur') (2005), Shri Shri Govindaji Temple, Yaoshang and Pung Cholom (2006), Maibi and Lai Haraoba (2017), Hiyang Hiren and Pakhangba (2010), Maiba, Pena (musical instrument) & Khamba Thoibi Jagoi (2018)

=== Architectural designs and sculptures ===
Some of the significant intricate designs of the traditional Meitei architecture and sculptures are seen in various buildings and institutions, especially the temples of traditional Meitei religion: Hiyangthang Lairembi Temple, Pakhangba Temple, Kangla, Sanamahi Kiyong Temple, Thangjing Temple, Moirang, among many. Others include the Ima Keithel, Kangla Sanathong. include Some of the worthy to mention finely crafted sculptures are the Marjing Polo Statue, Kangla Sha sculptures, Statue of Meidingu Nara Singh.

=== Classical and folk dances, festivals and ritualistic theatres ===
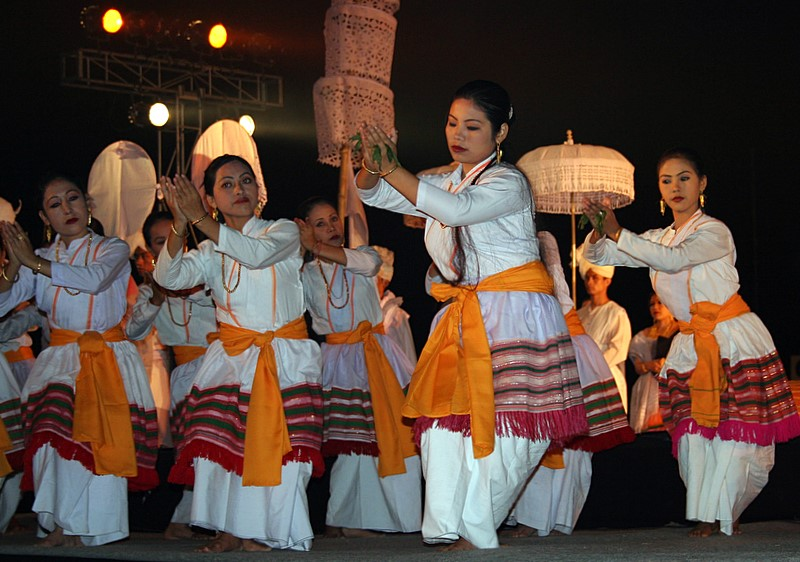
Maibis (Meitei for 'priestesses') dancing in Lai Haraoba (Meitei for 'Merrymaking festival of the gods')

The Lai Haraoba (Meitei for 'Merrymaking festival of the gods') is a traditional Meitei ritualistic theatrical festival, consisting of different dances, musical performances and carnivals in the temples and the streets. It's dedicated to the worship of the ancient Meitei gods and goddesses, who are categorised as the Umang Lai (Meitei for 'Sylvan deities') and Lam Lai (Meitei for 'Tutelary deities').

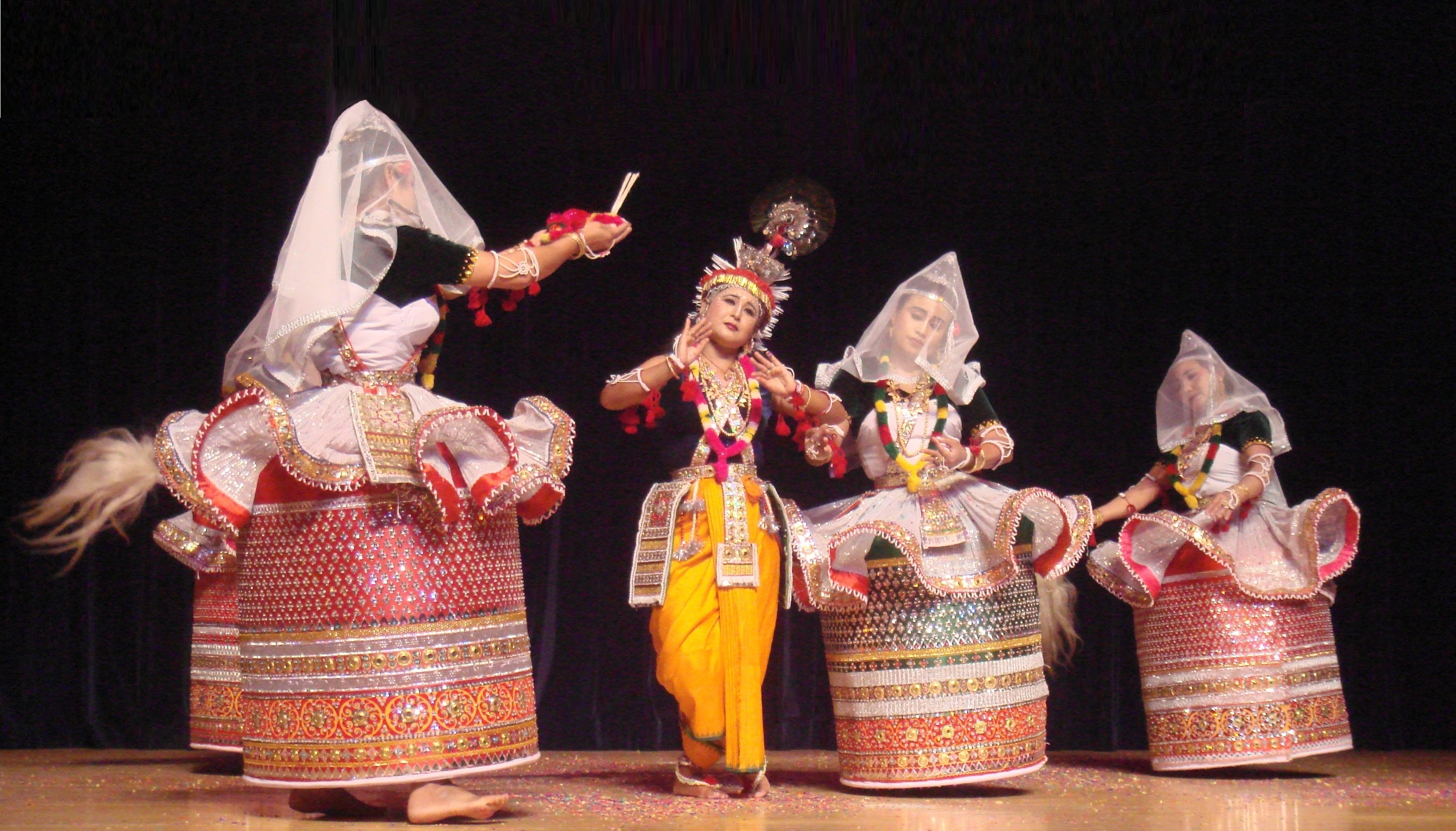
Raslila in Jagoi Raas (Meitei for 'Manipuri classical dance') style

The Manipuri classical dance, also referred to as the Manipuri Raas Leela (Meitei: Jagoi Raas, Raas Jagoi), is a jagoi and is one of the major Indian classical dance forms, originating from the historical Manipur Kingdom.

=== Theatre and cinema ===
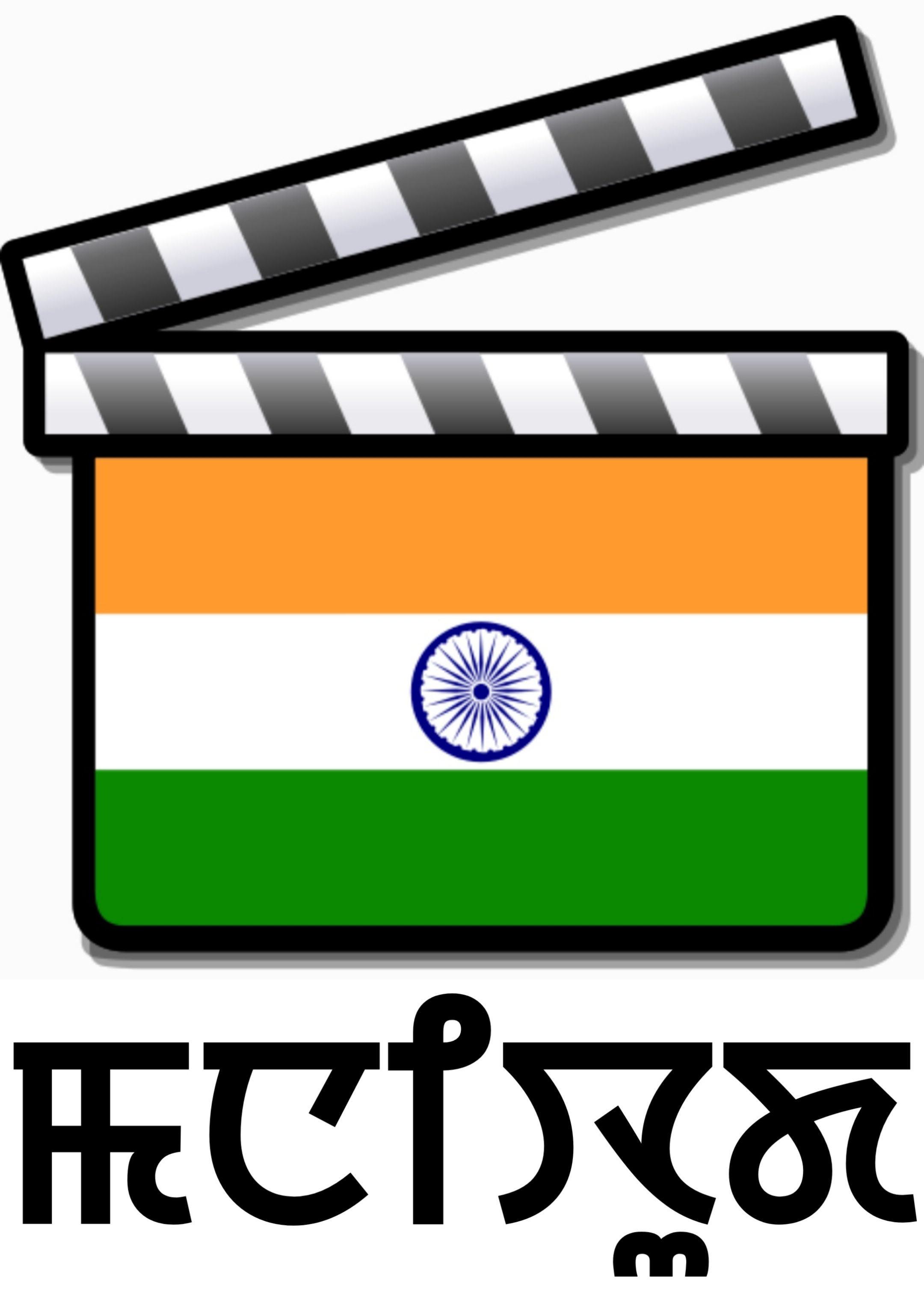
The clapperboard of Meitei cinema (Maniwood)

The first Manipuri-language film, Matamgi Manipur, was released on 9 April 1972. Paokhum Ama (1983) is the first full-length colour feature film (according to the Academy's definition of a feature film) of Manipur and was directed by Aribam Syam Sharma. Lammei (2002) is the first Manipuri Video film to have a commercial screening at a theatre.

==== Golden Montgolfiere at the Nantes ====
Imagi Ningthem (Meitei for 'My Son, My Precious') (1981) is the only Indian film that gets the Golden Montgolfiere at the Festival des 3 Continents, Nantes in 1982, bringing fame and honour of the Indian cinema at the international platform.

==== World classic in Cannes ====
Ishanou (Meitei for 'The Chosen One') (1990) was screened in the Un Certain Regard section at the 1991 Cannes Film Festival, and again after a gap of 33 years, it was recognised as a "World Classic" by the 2023 Cannes Film Festival. Notably, it was the only film selected from India for the event in that year.

=== Religions and beliefs ===
According to the 2011 census, 222,422 people (14.6 percent) follow the traditional Sanamahi religion of the Meitei people. The remainder (1,298,821 people, 85.3 percent) follow Hinduism and Christianity as per the census. The number of Christians is expected to be small. For example, the valley districts of Manipur, the major concentration of Meitei people, have about 3,000 Christians. (Note: The valley districts of Manipur have 59,324 Christians. The vast majority of them are (56,913 people) belong to Manipur's tribal communities.)

Most Meiteis follow both Hinduism as well as Sanamahi religious traditions and rituals. For example, they worship Sanamahi in the south-west corners of their homes.

=== Calendar ===
The Meitei people follow a traditional calendar called Maliyafam Palcha Kumsing, which has 12 months and a 7-day week.

=== Cuisine ===
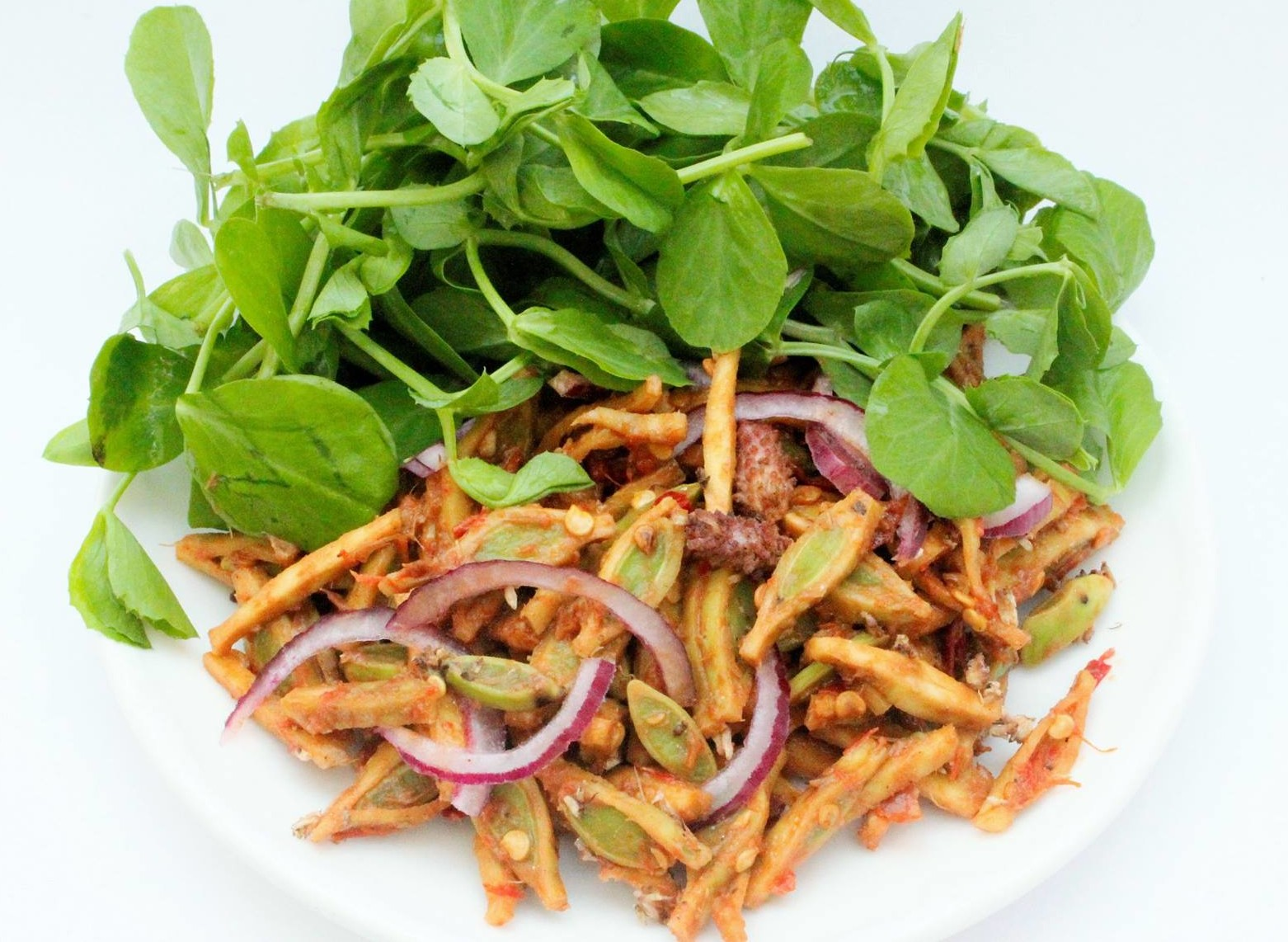
Singju is a signature dish of the Meitei cuisine

Rice, vegetables and fish are staple food of the Meiteis, although meat is also consumed; but in traditional Meitei dishes, meat is never used in non-vegetarian dishes. In traditional and cultural gatherings; fish, snails, oysters, crabs, eels etc. are the only non-vegetarian elements used and a significant number of Meiteis follow it where meat is cooked and eaten outside the house if consumed.

Rice is the main carbohydrate source in a Meitei dish; typically, it is served with vegetables, fish, freshwater snails, crabs, oysters, eels etc. Among the most famous species of fishes Manipuri Sareng (Wallago attu) or commonly known as Helicopter catfish, Hilsa (ilish Tenualosa ilisha), freshwater snails (pila (gastropod)) and edible oysters are considered a delicacy. The vegetables are either made as stews (Kangsoi) with less oil/no oil used in sauteing, or stir fried directly in oil with various added spices to make an oily spicy side dish (Kanghou). Roasted/Smoked and sun-dried fish or fried fresh fish is usually added in most of the stews and curry to impart special taste. The vegetables, herbs and fruits consumed in the region are more similar to those in Southeast/East/Central Asian, Siberian, Arctic, Polynesian and Micronesian cuisines such as Myanmar, Thailand, Inuit, etc. E.g. treebean (yongchak), galangal (loklei), culantro (awa phadigom), lime basil (mayangton), fishwort (tokningkhok) and many others, which are not cultivated in northern India.

One of the most important ingredients in Meitei cooking is Ngari (fermented fish). Roasted ngari is used in the singju (a kind of salad), morok metpa (chilli chutney), eromba (boiled and mashed veggies with chillies). A variety of fermented bamboo shoots (soibum) as well as fresh bamboo shoots (Ushoi/Shoidon), and fermented soya beans (hawaijaar) also form an important part of Meitei cuisines. All meals are served with some fresh aromatic herbs on the side.

A typical every day Meitei meal will have rice, vegetable or fish curry, a piquant side dish (either morok metpa or eromba accompanied with herbs), a champhut (a steamed/boiled vegetable with little sugar, e.g., carrot, pumpkin or cucumber slices or steamed/boiled mustard green stems, etc. without sugar), and a Kanghou. Meat cuisines are also popular amongst the Meiteis and some of the common meat curries are yen thongba (chicken curry) and nganu thongba (duck curry) and depending on regions, oak thongba (pork curry) and shan thongba (beef curry).

=== Subsistence ===
The Meitei are mainly agriculturists in which rice is a staple crop. However, they also grow mangoes, lemons, pineapples, oranges, guavas, and other fruits. Fishing is also common among the Meitei that can either be a profession or a hobby. Women tend to dominate the local markets as sellers of food items, textiles, and traditional clothing.

== Associations and organisations ==
=== Cultural revivalist organisations ===
Arambai Tenggol is a socio-political organisation involved in the revival and preservation of the indigenous Meitei culture, which has developed into an armed militia in the course of the 2023–2025 Manipur violence. Meira Paibi (Women torch bearers) is a Meitei women's social movement referred to as the "guardians of civil society".

=== Society-based ===
- Nikhil Manipuri Mahasabha

=== Language-based ===
- Manipuri Sahitya Parishad
- Naharol Sahitya Premee Samitee

=== Religion-based ===
- International Sanamahism Students' Association
- Lainingthou Sanamahi Sana Pung
- Lainingthou Sanamahi Temple Board
- South East Asia Cultural Organisation

== See also ==
- Meitei Brahmins
- 2023 Manipur violence
- List of Meitei kings
  - Ningthouja dynasty

== Sources ==
- Brandt, Carmen (5 December 2017). "Writing off domination: the Chakma and Meitei script movements". South Asian History and Culture. 9: 116–140. doi:10.1080/19472498.2017.1411050. ISSN 1947-2498. S2CID 148911026.
- Hazarika, Manjil (2017). Prehistory and Archaeology of Northeast India: Multidisciplinary Investigation in an Archaeological Terra Incognita. Vol. 1. Oxford University Press. doi:10.1093/oso/9780199474660.001.0001. ISBN 978-0-19-947466-0.
- Parratt, Saroj Nalini Arambam (2005). The Court Chronicle of the Kings of Manipur: The Cheitharon Kumpapa : Original Text, Translation, and Notes. London: Routledge. ISBN 0-415-34430-1.
- Sebastian, Rodney (2019). Cultural Fusion in a Religious Dance Drama: Building the Sacred Body in the Manipuri Rāslīlās (Thesis). University of Florida. ProQuest 2464172212.
