= National Film Award for Best Manipuri Feature Film =

Indian film award

- Description: Best Manipuri feature film of the year
- Sponsored by: National Film Development Corporation of India
- Formerly called: National Film Award for Best Feature Film in Manipuri (1972–2021)
- Rewards: Rajat Kamal (Silver Lotus); ₹2,00,000
- First award: 1972
- Most recent winner: Sunita

The National Film Award for Best Manipuri Feature Film is one of the National Film Awards presented annually by the National Film Development Corporation of India. It is a reserved category for films made in Meitei language (officially known as Manipuri language). It is one of several awards presented for feature films and awarded with Rajat Kamal (Silver Lotus). Since the 70th National Film Awards, the name was changed to "Best Manipuri Feature Film".

The National Film Awards, established in 1954, are the most prominent film awards in India that merit the best of the Indian cinema. The ceremony also presents awards for films in various regional languages.

Awards for films in seven regional languages (Bengali, Hindi, Kannada, Malayalam, Marathi, Tamil and Telugu) started from 2nd National Film Awards which were presented on December 21, 1955. Three awards of "President's Silver Medal for Best Feature Film", "Certificate of Merit for the Second Best Feature Film" and "Certificate of Merit for the Third Best Feature Film" were instituted. The latter two certificate awards were discontinued from 15th National Film Awards (1967).

It was instituted in 1972 and awarded at 20th National Film Awards and lately awarded at 59th National Film Awards in 2011. Per Constitution of India, Manipuri language is among the languages specified in the Schedule VIII of the Constitution.

== Winners ==
Award includes 'Rajat Kamal' (Silver Lotus Award) and cash prize. Following are the award winners over the years:

Awards legends
*	President's Silver Medal for Best Feature Film
*	Certificate of Merit for the Second Best Feature Film
*	Certificate of Merit for the Third Best Feature Film
*	Certificate of Merit for the Best Feature Film

List of films, showing the year (award ceremony), producer(s) and director(s)
Year	Film(s)	Producer(s)	Director(s)	Refs.
1972 (20th)	Matamgi Manipur	Karam Monomohan Singh	Deb Kumar Bose	
1976 (24th)	Saaphabee	G. Narayan Sharma	Aribam Syam Sharma	
1979 (27th)	Olangthagee Wangmadasoo	G. Narayan Sharma	Aribam Syam Sharma	
1981 (29th)	Imagi Ningthem	K. Ibohal Sharma	Aribam Syam Sharma	
1983 (31st)	Sanakeithel	Th. Doren	M. A. Singh	
1990 (38th)	Ishanou	Aribam Syam Sharma	Aribam Syam Sharma	
1993 (41st)	Sambal Wangma	Sobita Devi	K. Ibohal Sharma	
1994 (42nd)	Mayophygee Macha	Thouyangba and Thoungamba	Oken Amakcham	
1995 (43rd)	Sanabi	NFDC	Aribam Syam Sharma	
2000 (48th)	Chatledo Eidi	Makhonmani Mongsaba	Makhonmani Mongsaba	
2011 (59th)	Phijigee Mani	Takhelchangbam Ongbi Medha Sharmi	Oinam Gautam Singh	
2012 (60th)	Leipaklei	Aribam Syam Sharma	Aribam Syam Sharma	
2015 (63rd)	Eibusu Yaohanbiyu	Yunman Hitalar (Neta) Singh	Maipaksana Haorongbam	
2019 (67th)	Eigi Kona	Luwang Apokpa Mamikol Productions	Bobby Wahengbam and Maipaksana Haorongbam	
2021 (69th)	Eikhoigi Yum	Chingsubam Sheetal	Romi Meitei	
2024 (72nd)	Sunita	Skyline Pictures	Ajit Yumnam	
