= Olangthagee Wangmadasoo =

- Poster
- Directed by: Aribam Syam Sharma
- Screenplay by: M. K. Binodini Devi
- Story by: M. K. Binodini Devi
- Produced by: G. Narayan Sharma
- Starring: Kangabam Tomba; Yengkhom Roma; Kshetrimayum Rashi
- Cinematography: Deojibhai Padhiar
- Music by: Shyam and Khun Joy
- Production company: N.S. Films
- Distributed by: N.S. Films
- Release date: 18 January 1980
- Running time: 114 minutes
- Country: India
- Language: Meiteilon (Manipuri)

Olangthagee Wangmadasoo (English: Even Beyond the Summer Horizon) is a 1980 Manipuri film written by M. K. Binodini Devi, produced by G. Narayan Sharma and directed by Aribam Syam Sharma. The film features Kangabam Tomba, Yengkhom Roma and Kshetrimayum Rashi in the lead roles. The movie was censored in 1979 and released at Friends Talkies, Paona Bazar on 18 January 1980. It was the first ever and the only Manipuri film to run for more than 30 weeks, till date. The film ran for 32 weeks at the box office.

The movie was among the films screened at the International Film Festival of India 2015 under the section A special retrospective on ace filmmaker Aribam Shyam Sharma.

== Plot ==
The film tells the story of Bijoy and Thadoi, who fall in love and decide to marry. They first meet at a musical evening, where Bijoy is one of the singers. Thadoi is a medical student who also writes poems, which Bijoy sets to music. While Bijoy's grandfather wants him to learn the art of swordsmanship, his grandmother wants him to study music and singing. They are both serious about marriage. In contrast, Thadoi's brother Kamaljit and his wife want her to marry their wealthy friend Jiten. Thadoi elopes with Bijoy, but they are separated when Kamaljit agrees to perform the kanyā-dāna ritual for her, a promise which he later breaks.

When Bijoy's grandfather arrives to discuss the matter, Kamaljit's henchmen attack him and he dies. Despite the obstacles put in their way by Kamaljit, however, their love does not die. The plot is interspersed with several twists and turns, such as the attack on Bijoy, his grandfather's death, a pilgrimage and a kidnapping. There are several twists until all the misunderstandings are resolved and Bijoy and Thadoi are finally reconciled.

== Cast ==
- Kangabam Tomba as Bijoy
- Yengkhom Roma as Thadoi
- Kshetrimayum Rashi as Widow
- Soraisam Keshoram
- Tondon
- Joykumar

== Reception ==
The Northeast Today wrote, "This Aribam Syam Sharma movie won the National Award. Starring Kangabam Tomba, Yengkhom Roma and Rashi, Keshoram, so popular was the movie that it is believed to have surpassed the Bollywood super-hit movie, Sholay in Manipur."

== Production ==
This movie is a production from N.S. Films (Narayan Sharma Films), the production company which also gave box-office hits like Lamja Parshuram (1974) and Saaphabee (1976).

== Soundtrack ==
The movie has nine songs sung by four playback singers.

Olangthagee Wangmadasoo

Soundtrack album by Aheibam Syam Sharma, Arambam Jamuna, Khun Joykumar, S. Nabachandra Sharma
- Released: 1979
- Genre: Feature film soundtrack
- Length: 36:28
- Label: N.S. Films
- Producer: G. Narayan Sharma

No.	Title	Singer(s)	Length
1.	"Khangnadringei Ukhi Nongma"	Aheibam Shyam	04:09
2.	"Nanggee Shamlang Leichillak"	Kh. Joykumar	03:12
3.	"Thajana Eibu Kouthoklei"	A. Jamuna Devi	03:10
4.	"Kari Eshei Shamlang"	Aheibam Shyam	03:10
5.	"Shree Govinda Pinaheiba"	A. Jamuna Devi, Aheibam Shyam, Kh. Joykumar	03:00
6.	"Tajahounihe"	A. Jamuna Devi, Aheibam Shyam, Kh. Joykumar, S. Nabachandra Sharma	04:42
7.	"Laklo Chatsi"	A. Jamuna Devi, S. Nabachandra Sharma	05:33
8.	"Machu Taretna Yekliba Mangni"	A. Jamuna Devi, Kh. Joykumar	04:54
9.	"Leichilgee Meichak"	A. Jamuna Devi	04:38
Total length:			36:28

== Accolades ==
The movie won the Rajat Kamal for the National Film Award for Best Feature Film in Manipuri at the 27th National Film Awards.

Khumanthem Prakash won the Best Lyrics Award in the 1st Manipur State Film Festival 1984 for the film.
