= Manipuri cinema =

Manipuri cinema may refer to:

- Cinema of Manipur, film industry in the Indian state of Manipur
  - Meitei cinema, films made in the Meitei (or Manipuri) language
