= Kangabam Tomba =

Indian actor

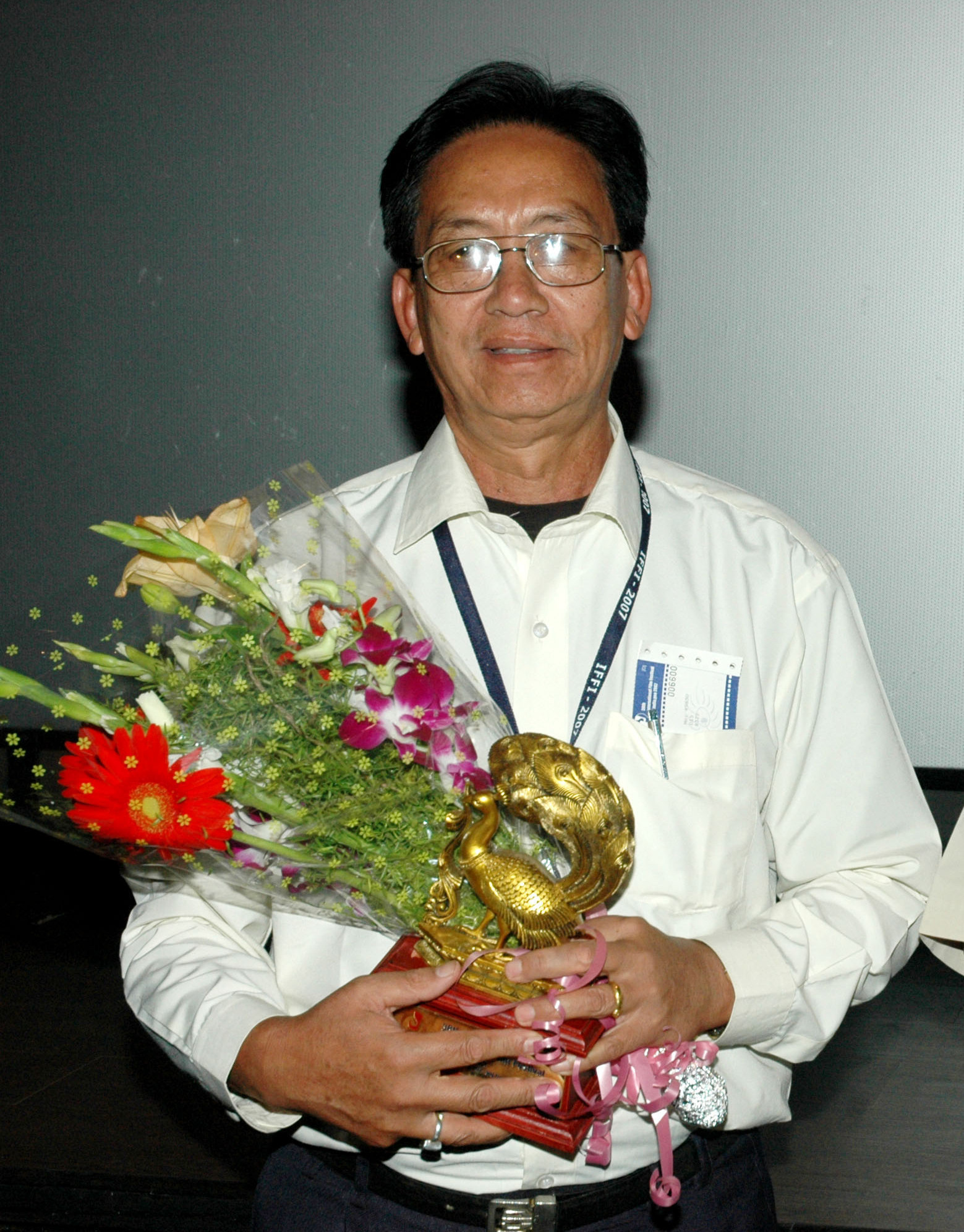
- Kangabam Tomba at IFFI 2007, Panaji, Goa
- Born: 10 June 1946; Hiyanglam, Manipur; Present address: Kwakeithel Laishram Leikai, Imphal, Manipur
- Occupation: Actor
- Spouse: R.K. Bhanumati Devi
- Parent(s): Kangabam Yaima Singh; Taibangjam Ningol Thouranijaobi Devi

Kangabam Tomba (born 10 June 1946) is an Indian actor from Imphal, Manipur. He started his career in theatre. His first appearance in movies is in Matamgi Manipur, the first Manipuri full-length feature film where he played a college guy. His is popularly known as Lamja Tomba for his title role in the 1974 movie Lamja Parshuram. Tomba bagged the Best Actor Award at the 1st Manipur State Film Festival 1984 for the film. He was conferred with the Lifetime Achievement Award at the 11th Manipur State Film Awards 2018.

Tomba was awarded the Neta Irawat Leelaroi Lifetime Mana (Manipuri Cinema) at the 1st MANIFA 2012 organised by Sahitya Seva Samiti, Kakching.

== Early life and education ==
Kangabam Tomba is the youngest among his five siblings. He studied till VI standard in Kwakeithel Boys' School, Imphal. He completed his high school from Ram Lal Paul High School. He did his further studies from Imphal College.

== Career ==
He first received the knowledge of theatre from his Manipuri teacher of Imphal College G.C. Tongbra, who was also a noted playwright. Tomba joined Society Theatre in 1967. Some of the famous plays where he had acted include Ani Thokna Chingkhaire, Julius Caesar, Hamlet, Mani Mamou and Ngabongkhao. Julius Caesar and Hamlet are Manipuri plays translated from their original versions of William Shakespeare by G.C. Tongbra.

He appeared as a college guy in Matamgi Manipur, the first Manipuri feature film in 1972. His first movie as a leading actor is Lamja Parshuram released in 1974, where he played the title role. The movie became a hit and since then, he is popularly known as Lamja Tomba. His 1979 movie Olangthagee Wangmadasoo ran for 32 weeks, the longest Manipuri movie to run in theatres till date and broke the local box office records of Sholay. In Paokhum Ama, he played a government employee from Imphal who is posted to a hill district of Manipur. He was the leading male protagonist in 1990 Aribam Syam Sharma's movie Ishanou, which was critically acclaimed worldwide and participated in the prestigious Cannes Film Festival 1991.

He has also acted in digital films like Ashangba Nongjabi, Nangtana Helli, Amamba Lambee and Nongphadok Lakpa Atithi. Tomba is an approved radio artist of All India Radio, Imphal. Some of the well known radio plays where he was a part are Ashangba Nongjabi and Nongphadok Lakpada.

== Filmography ==
Year	Film	Role	Director
1972	Matamgi Manipur	Birjit	Debkumar Bose
1974	Lamja Parshuram	Parshuram	Aribam Syam Sharma
1976	Saaphabee	Loya Naha Saaphaba	Aribam Syam Sharma
1979	Olangthagee Wangmadasoo	Bijoy	Aribam Syam Sharma
1983	Paokhum Ama	Iboyaima	Aribam Syam Sharma
1990	Ishanou	Dhanabir	Aribam Syam Sharma
1993	Thambal	Ibohal	Kripa
1998	Meiree	Police Officer	L. Surjakanta
2003	Ashangba Nongjabi	Indu's uncle	Aribam Syam Sharma
2004	Reporter	Ibohal	L. Surjakanta
2005	Nangtana Helli	Suraj's father	Oken Amakcham
2005	Mathang Mapokta	Bijoy	Diya Khwairakpam
2006	Mikuptudagee	Purnima's father	Chou-En-Lai & O. Mangi
2006	Mang-Ngal	Leina's father	Maya Choudhury & Vir Bhadra Yumnam
2006	Ngaihak Lambida	Stranger	Haobam Paban Kumar
2009	Oja Sandhya	Sandhya's father	Oken Amakcham
2009	Loisinkhidraba Wari		Oken Amakcham
2010	Amamba Lambee	Arun's father	Oken Amakcham
2010	Piranglakta Manglan Ama	Maniyaima	Khangembam Kuleswar
2014	Ayekpa Lai	Ngamba's father	Oken Amakcham
2016	Mashingkha	Chinglen's father	Jeetendra Ningomba
2019	Nongphadok Lakpa Atithi	Mamma	Aribam Syam Sharma
