= Sunita (2024 film) =

2024 Meitei language film

- Directed by: Ajit Yumnam
- Written by: Ajit Yumnam
- Produced by: Skyline Pictures
- Starring: Narmada Shougaijam
- Cinematography: Nihal Bandari
- Edited by: Hiranmoy Gogoi
- Music by: Gopi
- Production company: Skyline Pictures
- Release date: 2024
- Country: India
- Language: Meitei (Manipuri)

Sunita is a 2024 Indian Meitei language film, written and directed by Ajit Yumnam. Produced by Skyline Pictures, the film stars Narmada Shougaijam in the title role. Based on the life of Moirangthem Sunita, the film chronicles her journey from losing her eyesight at a young age to overcoming social and personal challenges through resilience and determination. The film won the award for Best Manipuri Film at the 72nd National Film Awards.

The film was officially selected for and premiered at the 2nd Eikhoigi Imphal International Film Festival in 2025.

== Cast ==
- Narmada Shougaijam
- Gurumayum Bonny
- Khekhe Leihaothabam
- Bala Tensubam

== Accolades ==
At the 2nd North East India Film Festival in 2025, Sunita received the Special Mention (Feature Film) award, while Narmada Shougaijam won the Special Jury Award for her performance. At the 17th Manipur State Film Awards 2025, the film won Best Actor in a Leading Role (Female), Best Audiographer (Location/Sync Sound), Best Sound Designer, Best Make-Up Artist, and Best Art Designer. It went on to win the Best Feature Film in Manipuri award at the 72nd National Film Awards.

=== MANIFA 2025 ===
Category	Winner
Best Cinematography	Nihal Bhandari
Best Editing	Hiranmoy Gogoi
Best Make-up	Dabo Wangkheimayum
Best Costume	Nganthoi Luwang
Best Audiographer	Nabapan Deka
Best Art Director	Puinabati Thongam

== Reception ==
Signpost News praised Sunita for its performances, technical execution, cinematography, editing, music, and authentic depiction of its central character, while observing that its uneven screenplay and narrative structure prevented the film from fully realizing its emotional potential.
