= Paokhum Ama =

1983 Indian film

- Poster
- Directed by: Aribam Syam Sharma
- Written by: M. K. Binodini Devi
- Produced by: Films Division
- Starring: Kangabam Tomba; Yengkhom Roma
- Cinematography: K. Ibohal Sharma; L. Daoji Sharma
- Edited by: Madhusudan Banerjee
- Music by: Khundrakpam Joykumar
- Production company: Films Division
- Distributed by: Films Division
- Release date: 1983
- Running time: 54 minutes
- Country: India
- Language: Meiteilon (Manipuri)

Paokhum Ama (English: The Only Answer) is a 1983 Manipuri film and also the first colour cinema of Manipur. The film is directed by Aribam Syam Sharma and written by M. K. Binodini Devi. It stars Kangabam Tomba and Yengkhom Roma in the lead roles. The movie was premiered at the Tyneside International Film Festival, United Kingdom.

== Synopsis ==
The film explores the diverse lifestyles of modern-day India. In urban society, corruption is widespread, with bribes influencing career progression. However, there is an alternative: life in the hills, where people face life with acceptance and gratitude for nature's gifts. Ultimately optimistic, the film tells the story of a Manipuri youth who, having endured personal pain and disappointment, faces the struggle of his family for a different way of life with new hope and energy.

== Cast ==
- Kangabam Tomba as Iboyaima
- Yengkhom Roma as Harmila
- Soraisam Dhiren as Iboyaima's brother
- Huirem Manglem as Sanahal
- Thokchom Ongbi Jamini as Bina
- Kshetrimayum Rashi
- Wangkhem Lalitkumar

== Accolades ==
Yengkhom Roma won the Best Actress Award at the 1st Manipur State Film Awards 1984 for her role of Harmila in the film.
