= 29th National Film Awards (India) =

1982 Indian film award

- Awarded for: Best of Indian cinema in 1981
- Awarded by: Directorate of Film Festivals
- Presented by: Neelam Sanjiva Reddy (President of India)
- Presented on: April 1982
- Official website: dff.nic.in

Highlights
- Best Feature Film: Dakhal
- Best Book: Thamizh Cinemavin Kathai
- Dadasaheb Phalke Award: Naushad Ali
- Most awards: Umrao Jaan (4)

The 29th National Film Awards, presented by Directorate of Film Festivals, the organisation set up by Ministry of Information and Broadcasting, India to felicitate the best of Indian Cinema released in the year 1981, took place in April 1982.

With 29th National Film Awards, new category for books on Indian cinema was introduced. The awards aim to encourage the study and appreciation of cinema as an art form and dissemination of information and critical appreciation of this art form through publication of books, articles, reviews, etc.

== Juries ==
Three different committees were formed for feature films, short films and books on cinema, headed by veteran actor Ashok Kumar, Vasant Joglekar and Asok Mitra respectively.

- Jury Members: Feature Films
  - Ashok Kumar (Chairperson) • B. A. Arasukumar • Leela Chitnis • B. R. Chopra • Salil Chowdhury • Suresh Kathuria • Yamini Krishnamurthy • R. Lakshman • Dnyaneshwar Kulkarni • Bhabendra Nath Saikia • M. Shamim • Sundari K. Shridharani • S. G. Vasudev • Inturi Venkateswara Rao
- Jury Members: Short Films
  - Vasant Joglekar (Chairperson) • Harisadhan Dasgupta • Jagat Murari • Ramesh Sharma
- Jury Members: Books on Cinema
  - Asok Mitra (Chairperson) • P. V. Akilandan • Chidananda Dasgupta • Sunil Gangopadhyay • Pritish Nandy • P. Padmarajan • Na. Parthasarathy • M. T. Vasudevan Nair

== Awards ==
Awards were divided into feature films, non-feature films and books written on Indian cinema.

=== Lifetime Achievement Award ===
Name of Award	Image	Awardee(s)	Awarded As	Awards
Dadasaheb Phalke Award		Naushad Ali	Music director	Swarna Kamal, ₹40,000 and a Shawl

=== Feature films ===
Feature films were awarded at All India as well as regional level. For 29th National Film Awards, a Bengali film, Dakhal won the National Film Award for Best Feature Film whereas a Hindi film, Umrao Jaan won the maximum number of awards (four). In the honour of veteran actress Nargis Dutt who died in 1981, award for best feature film on national integration was renamed as Nargis Dutt Award for Best Feature Film on National Integration. Following were the awards given in each category:

==== All India Award ====
Following were the awards given:

Name of Award	Name of Film	Language	Awardee(s)	Cash prize
Best Feature Film	Dakhal	Bengali	Producer: Government of West Bengal	Swarna Kamal and ₹50,000/-
Best Feature Film	Dakhal	Bengali	director: Gautam Ghose	Swarna Kamal and ₹25,000/-
Best Feature Film	Citation: For the visual eloquence with which it portrays the travails of a daughter of a soil courageously fighting for a social justice in the face of all odds and for the remarkable ability of its young director who writes the screenplay, handles the camera, scores the music and directs the film in a poetic manner.			
Second Best Feature Film	Pokkuveyil	Malayalam	Producer: K. Ravindran Nair	Rajat Kamal and ₹30,000/-
Second Best Feature Film	Pokkuveyil	Malayalam	Director: G. Aravindan	Rajat Kamal and ₹15,000/-
Second Best Feature Film	Citation: For visualising in a sustained, poetic manner the gnawing agony of the human mind dangerously hovering on the edge of insanity; for marrying the images superbly with haunting classical music on the sound track and creating an unorthodox, sensitive, deeply moving work of exquisite beauty.			
Best Feature Film on National Integration	Sapthapadhi	Telugu	Producer: Bheemavarapu Buchhireddy	Rajat Kamal and ₹30,000/-
Best Feature Film on National Integration	Sapthapadhi	Telugu	Director: K. Viswanath	Rajat Kamal and ₹15,000/-
Best Feature Film on National Integration	Citation: For focusing on the problems of the society whose orthodoxy inflicts grave injustice on the under-privileged, for the dilemma faced by a Brahmin disciplinarian in confronting his grand-daughter's love for Harijan, for resolving the problem in a rational manner, worthy of the country's best secular traditions.			
Best Debut Film of a Director	Aadharshila	Hindi	Producer and Director: Ashok Ahuja	Rajat Kamal and ₹10,000/-
Best Debut Film of a Director	Citation: For making a bold statement on the aspirations and frustrations of the young generation of film-makers he himself represents and for a very sensitive treatment of the relationship between an idealist director and an inscrutable story-write.			
Best Direction	36 Chowringhee Lane	English	Aparna Sen	Rajat Kamal and ₹20,000/-
Best Direction	Citation: For effectively orchestrating the creative and technical elements in her first film, for a poignant portrayal of loneliness in old age and for bringing to the screen a true-to-life situation in post-independence India.			
Best Screenplay	Thanneer Thanneer	Tamil	K. Balachander	Rajat Kamal and ₹10,000/-
Best Screenplay	Citation: For translating the suffering of the people in drought-affected areas into a gripping visual narrative.			
Best Actor	Arohan	Hindi	Om Puri	Rajat Kamal and ₹10,000/-
Best Actor	Citation: For a very convincing portrayal of a harassed farmer courageously fighting vested interests who seek to block the implementation of land reforms.			
Best Actress	Umrao Jaan	Hindi	Rekha	Rajat Kamal and ₹10,000/-
Best Actress	Citation: For appealing portrayal of Umrao Jaan, a real life courtesan and poetess of the 19th century.			
Best Child Artist	Imagi Ningthem	Meitei	Leikhendra Singh	Rajat Kamal and ₹5,000/-
Best Child Artist	Citation: For an endearing portrayal of a child and his yearning for a mother's love.			
Best Cinematography (Color)	36 Chowringhee Lane	English	Ashok Mehta	Rajat Kamal and ₹10,000/-
Best Cinematography (Color)	Citation: For the technical excellence, for highlighting the tonality, texture and nuances of the story and for an outstanding work as a cameraman.			
Best Cinematography (Black and White)	Mooru Darigalu	Kannada	Shripati R. Bhat	Rajat Kamal and ₹10,000/-
Best Cinematography (Black and White)	Citation: For projecting the mood of the film in a vivid manner.			
Best Audiography	Elippathayam	Malayalam	P. Devadas	Rajat Kamal and ₹10,000/-
Best Audiography	Citation: For a brilliantly mixed soundtrack and impressive use of silences to underline the dramatic moments of the film.			
Best Editing	Arohan	Hindi	Bhanudas Divakar	Rajat Kamal and ₹10,000/-
Best Editing	Citation: For precision in timing, for excellent juxtaposition of images, for sustained tempo and rhythm and a masterful creation of the deluge sequence.			
Best Art Direction	Umrao Jaan	Hindi	Manzoor	Rajat Kamal and ₹7,500/-
Best Art Direction	Citation: For re-creating the sets of the Lucknow Kothas and aristocratic homes with an unerring sense of the historical period portrayed.			
Best Music Direction	Umrao Jaan	Hindi	Khayyam	Rajat Kamal and ₹10,000/-
Best Music Direction	Citation: For a finely turned score which invokes the spirit of the period and for a felicitous use of music to enrich the central character of the film.			
Best Male Playback Singer	Ek Duuje Ke Liye	Hindi	S. P. Balasubrahmanyam	Rajat Kamal and ₹10,000/-
Best Male Playback Singer	Citation: For great feeling and sense of rhythm which he brings to his vocal rendering.			
Best Female Playback Singer	Umrao Jaan	Hindi	Asha Bhosle	Rajat Kamal and ₹10,000/-
Best Female Playback Singer	Citation: For the style with which she invests the rendering of the ghazals that form a part of the texture of the film.			
Special Jury Award	Sadgati	Hindi	Satyajit Ray	Rajat Kamal and ₹5,000/-
Special Jury Award	Citation: For making the strongest of comments in the simplest of languages on the caste system and for probing the complex relationship between a downtrodden tanner and a callous Brahmin priest in a village.			

==== Regional Award ====
The awards were given to the best films made in the regional languages of India. For feature films in Assamese, Gujarati, Kashmiri and Punjabi language, award for Best Feature Film was not given.

Name of Award	Name of Film	Awardee(s)	Awards
Best Feature Film in Bengali	Adalat o Ekti Meye	Producer: Dhiresh Kumar Chakraborty	Rajat Kamal and ₹15,000/-
Best Feature Film in Bengali	Adalat o Ekti Meye	Director: Tapan Sinha	Rajat Kamal and ₹7,500/-
Best Feature Film in Bengali	Citation: For its powerful presentation of the problems of rape and its shattering after-effects in the life of a woman.		
Best Feature Film in English	36 Chowringhee Lane	Producer: Shashi Kapoor	Rajat Kamal and ₹15,000/-
Best Feature Film in English	36 Chowringhee Lane	Director: Aparna Sen	Rajat Kamal and ₹7,500/-
Best Feature Film in English	Citation: For eloquently portraying the tragedy of a lonely woman belonging to the Anglo-Indian community in contemporary India.		
Best Feature Film in Hindi	Arohan	Producer: Government of West Bengal	Rajat Kamal and ₹15,000/-
Best Feature Film in Hindi	Arohan	Director: Shyam Benegal	Rajat Kamal and ₹7,500/-
Best Feature Film in Hindi	Citation: For hard-hitting treatment of contemporary reality, especially as it is reflected in the continuing predicament of the West Bengal peasantry.		
Best Feature Film in Kannada	Bara	Producer: M. S. Sathyu	Rajat Kamal and ₹15,000/-
Best Feature Film in Kannada	Bara	Director: M. S. Sathyu	Rajat Kamal and ₹7,500/-
Best Feature Film in Kannada	Citation: For an incisive analysis of the socio-political situation in a drought affected district.		
Best Feature Film in Malayalam	Elippathayam	Producer: K. Ravindran Nair	Rajat Kamal and ₹15,000/-
Best Feature Film in Malayalam	Elippathayam	Director: Adoor Gopalakrishnan	Rajat Kamal and ₹7,500/-
Best Feature Film in Malayalam	Citation: For presenting the total decadence of the feudal system with unusual sensitivity and realism and for perceptively portraying the personal tragedy of those caught up in it.		
Best Feature Film in Manipuri	Imagi Ningthem	Producer: K. Ibohal Sharma	Rajat Kamal and ₹15,000/-
Best Feature Film in Manipuri	Imagi Ningthem	Director: Aribam Syam Sharma	Rajat Kamal and ₹7,500/-
Best Feature Film in Manipuri	Citation: For its charm, simplicity and freshness of approach.		
Best Feature Film in Marathi	Umbartha	Producer: D. V. Rao and Jabbar Patel	Rajat Kamal and ₹15,000/-
Best Feature Film in Marathi	Umbartha	Director: Jabbar Patel	Rajat Kamal and ₹7,500/-
Best Feature Film in Marathi	Citation: For a sincere cinematic statement on the theme of a woman seeking to establish her identity by pursuing a career, even at the risk of alienation from her family.		
Best Feature Film in Oriya	Seeta Raati	Producer: Balram Misra	Rajat Kamal and ₹15,000/-
Best Feature Film in Oriya	Seeta Raati	Director: Manmohan Mahapatra	Rajat Kamal and ₹7,500/-
Best Feature Film in Oriya	Citation: For a commendable work on the theme of a woman who faces life courageously despite the orthodox forces aligned against her.		
Best Feature Film in Tamil	Thanneer Thanneer	Producer: P. R. Govindarajan	Rajat Kamal and ₹15,000/-
Best Feature Film in Tamil	Thanneer Thanneer	Director: K. Balachander	Rajat Kamal and ₹7,500/-
Best Feature Film in Tamil	Citation: For powerfully projecting the helplessness of a village community living in a drought-affected area and its valiant efforts to solve its problem through self-help being thwarted by an insensitive administrative system.		
Best Feature Film in Telugu	Seethakoka Chiluka	Producer: Edida Nageshwara Rao	Rajat Kamal and ₹15,000/-
Best Feature Film in Telugu	Seethakoka Chiluka	Director: Bharathiraja	Rajat Kamal and ₹7,500/-
Best Feature Film in Telugu	Citation: For skilfully handling the theme of inter-communal marriage and making an impassioned stand against bigotry.		

=== Non-Feature films ===
Following were the awards given:

Name of Award	Name of Film	Language	Awardee(s)	Cash prize
Best Information Film	Faces After The Storm	Hindi	Producer: Yash Chaudhary for Films Division; Director: Prakash Jha	Rajat Kamal and ₹5,000/- Each
Best Information Film	Citation: For a hard-hitting comment on a social problem capturing the anguish and horror of communal violence, made without compromise but with humanism and sincerity.			
Best Educational / Instructional Film	The Four Minutes	English	Producer: Vijay B. Chandra for Films Division; Director: B. G. Devare	Rajat Kamal and ₹5,000/- Each
Best Educational / Instructional Film	Citation: For an effective and purposeful film made with imagination and skill which may save precious lives.			
Best Promotional Film	Hydrum	English	Producer: Omprakash Sharma for Films Division; Director: Mahmood Quereshi	Rajat Kamal and ₹5,000/- Each
Best Promotional Film	Citation: For putting across innovative techniques of lifting water which will revolutionise the concept and practice of agriculture in hilly areas.			
Best Animation Film	The Thinker?	English	Producer: B. R. Shendge for Films Division; Director: A. R. Sen; Animator: M. Paralkar	Rajat Kamal and ₹5,000/- Each
Best Animation Film	Citation: For well done animation and for focusing on the problems of man and his environment.			
Best News Review	News Magazine No. 12	English	Vijay B. Chandra for Films Division	Rajat Kamal and ₹5,000/-
Best News Review	Citation: For its overall technical competence.			

=== Best Writing on Cinema ===
With 29th National Film Awards, new category for books on Indian cinema was introduced. The awards aim at the encouraging the study and appreciation of cinema as an art form and dissemination of information and critical appreciation of this art-form through publication of books, articles reviews etc. Following were the awards given:

Name of Award	Name of Book	Language	Awardee(s)	Cash prize
Best Book on Cinema	Thamizh Cinemavin Kathai	Tamil	Author: Aranthai Narayanan	₹5,000/-
Best Book on Cinema	Citation: For being the first systematic full length account of the Tamil cinema from its inception, with pertinent observation on the art of film making, for the likelihood of it enduring as a standard reference work, for lucid, systematic writing with appropriate illustrations, for being based more on original and personal perceptions than on derived or second-hand sources.			

=== Awards not given ===
Following were the awards not given as no film was found to be suitable for the award:

- Best Children's Film
- Best Film on Family Welfare
- Best Lyrics
- Best Popular Film Providing Wholesome Entertainment
- Best Film on Social Documentation
- Best Experimental Film
- Best Newsreel Cameraman
- Best Feature Film in Assamese
- Best Feature Film in Punjabi
