= Brojendragee Luhongba =

- Poster
- Directed by: S.N. Chand
- Screenplay by: S.N. Chand
- Story by: Dr. Lamabam Kamal
- Produced by: S.N. Chand
- Starring: S.N. Chand; Ramola Devi
- Cinematography: Anil Gupta
- Edited by: Rash Bihari Sinha
- Music by: S.N. Chand
- Production company: Sajatia Pictures
- Release date: 26 January 1973
- Running time: 122 minutes
- Country: India
- Language: Meiteilon (Manipuri)

Brojendragee Luhongba (Note: Since Meitei language (officially known as Manipuri language) uses Bengali script, the Bengali transliteration of the name of the film is rendered into two spellings, either "ব্রোজেন্দ্রগী লুহোংবা" ("Brojendragee Luhongba") or "ব্রোজেন্দ্রোগী লুহোংবা" ("Brojendrogee Luhongba") having different pronunciations in Meitei-language reading style, but the two spellings are pronounced similarly in case of Bengali language reading style.) (transl. Brojendra's Marriage (Note: "Luhongba" means "marriage" or "wedding" in Meitei language (officially known as Manipuri language))) is a 1973 black and white Manipuri film produced and directed by S.N. Chand (Sapam Nodia Chand), the first filmmaker of Manipur. It stars S.N. Chand and Y. Ramola Devi in lead roles. It is based on Lamabam Kamal's short story of the same title. S.N. Chand underwent cosmetic surgery for the film. Principal photography began in 1971 and the film got CBFC certification on 30 December 1972. The movie was released at Usha Cinema, Paona Bazar on 26 January 1973. The digitalised version (4K) of the film was screened at MSFDS (Manipur State Film Development Society), Imphal on 29 April 2022 as a part of the Golden Jubilee Celebration of Manipuri Cinema.

In the story, Dr. Kamal reflects the mode of marriage prevalent in the Manipuri society during his days. During marriage decisions, parents of both sides hold supreme authorities to the engaged bride and the engaged groom. Neither of the wedding partners could utter anything about the marriage.

== Plot ==
Brojendra, a doctor, agrees to marry a girl of his mother's choice being an obedient son. But he refuses to look at her face, even after marriage.

At a musical performance in his locality, days after his marriage, he chances upon a beautiful girl and exchanges meaningful glances with her. He returns home guilt-ridden for having neglected the girl whom he married and committing the wrongful act of giving undue attention to another girl, who was a complete stranger.

A surprise awaits him at his house. The beautiful girl who has swept him off his feet turns out to be none other than his wife.

== Cast ==
- S.N. Chand as Brojendra
- Y. Ramola Devi as Malti
- Oinam Biramangol as Brojendra's maternal uncle
- Uma Hijam
- Indu
- Nabakanta

== Accolades ==
Award	Category	Winner's name
1st Manipur State Film Awards 1984	Best Screenplay	Sapam Nodia Chand (S.N. Chand)

== See also ==
- List of Meitei-language films
