= Tales of Courage =

- Poster
- Directed by: Aribam Syam Sharma
- Produced by: Films Division of India
- Cinematography: Girish Padhiar
- Edited by: Gajendra Singh
- Music by: Aribam Syam Sharma; Sound: Aribam Arun; Mahesh Sharma
- Production company: Films Division of India
- Release date: 1986
- Running time: 20 minutes
- Country: India
- Language: English

Tales of Courage is a 1986 Manipuri documentary film directed by Aribam Syam Sharma. It was produced by Films Division of India. The film was screened at the 2nd Manipur International Documentary, Short and Animation Film Festival, 2010.

The film was among the selected special package of films under the title Colours of North East, organised by Films Division in November 2021 as a part of Azadi ka Amrit Mahotsav celebration.
