= Kshetrimayum Rashi =

Indian actress

- Born: 20 April 1945; Uripok, Imphal, Manipur
- Died: 20 June 2025 (aged 80)
- Occupation: Actress
- Parent(s): Kshetrimayum Bhubon Singh; Kshetrimayum Ongbi Wareppam Ningol Rasamani Devi

Kshetrimayum Rashi (full name: Kshetrimayum Ningol Lairellakpam Ongbi Rashi, 20 April 1945 - 20 June 2025) and poularly known as Rashi Leima was an Indian actress from Imphal, Manipur, who worked in theatre and Manipuri films. She was introduced into the world of theatre by her mother Rasamani Devi. She was best known for her role in the movie Imagi Ningthem, which also received wide international acclaim. Rashi had featured in over 150 radio plays. She was conferred with the Lifetime Achievement Award at the 13th Manipur State Film Awards 2020. She was also the recipient of the Sahitya Seva Samiti, Kakching Neta Irawat Leelaroi Lifetime Achievement Award in 2014.

She died on June 20, 2025.

== Career ==
Rashi got to know about acting and theatre from her mother. Her first play was Jadonang (staged in September 1969), where she played the role of Rani Gaidinliu in Aryan Theatre, Imphal. Gaidinliu saw the play and praised Rashi's performance. Her first silver screen appearance was in the 1972 movie Matamgi Manipur, the first full-length Manipuri feature film. Her role of widow in the movie Olangthagee Wangmadasoo is still vividly remembered by the cinema lovers of Manipur. In 1981, she went on to star in Imagi Ningthem (My Son, My Precious), which also became the first Indian film to win a Grand Prix Award. In the film, she portrayed the role of a step-mother. She also played supporting roles in digital films like Paokhum, Meera Memcha, Eidi Thamoi Pikhre and Eewai.

== Filmography ==
Year	Film	Role	Director
1972	Matamgi Manipur	Sunita	Debkumar Bose
1974	Lamja Parshuram	Kethabi	Aribam Syam Sharma
1976	Saaphabee	Saaphabee's friend	Aribam Syam Sharma
1979	Olangthagee Wangmadasoo	Widow	Aribam Syam Sharma
1981	Imagi Ningthem	Ekashini	Aribam Syam Sharma
1983	Paokhum Ama	Cameo appearance	Aribam Syam Sharma
1990	Thengmallabara Radha-Manbi	Bidhumukhi	Ningthouja Lancha
1993	Thambal		R.K. Kripa
2007	Meera Memcha	Raju's mother	Mohendro
2009	Paokhum	Anand's mother	Khwairakpam Bishwamittra
2010	Momon Meenok	Thariktha's mother	Ksh. Kishorekumar
2015	Eidi Thamoi Pikhre	Khomba's grandmother	Homen D' Wai
2022	Eewai	Henba's grandmother	Khwairakpam Bishwamittra
2023	Ashengba Eral		OC Meira
