= Ishanou =

1990 Manipuri film

Ishanou (The Chosen One)
- Official poster
- Directed by: Aribam Syam Sharma
- Written by: M. K. Binodini Devi
- Produced by: Aribam Syam Sharma
- Starring: Anoubam Kiranmala; Kangabam Tomba
- Cinematography: Girish Padhiar
- Edited by: Ujjal Nandy
- Music by: Aribam Syam Sharma
- Production company: Aribam Syam Sharma Productions
- Distributed by: Doordarshan Kendra Guwahati
- Release date: 6 July 1990
- Running time: 90 minutes
- Country: India
- Language: Meiteilon (Manipuri)

Ishanou (English: The Chosen One) is a 1990 Indian Manipuri film written by M. K. Binodini Devi and directed by Aribam Syam Sharma. The movie stars Anoubam Kiranmala and Kangabam Tomba in the lead roles. It was screened in the Un Certain Regard section at the 1991 Cannes Film Festival. In 2023, it was recognised as a "World Classic" by the Cannes Film Festival 2023 and it was the only film selected from India for the event for that year. The movie was first aired in Doordarshan and later released in Usha Cinema, Paona Bazar on 6 July 1990.

Ishanou was screened at many film festivals, including Singapore International Film Festival, London Film Festival, Des 3 Continents, Festival of Festivals Toronto, International Film Festival Rotterdam, Fribourg International Film Festival, Hawaii International Film Festival, Vancouver International Film Festival, Tokyo International Film Festival, Seattle International Film Festival and International Film Festival of India. Ishanou was restored by Film Heritage Foundation and the restored film was selected for a red-carpet world premiere at the Cannes Film Festival 2023.

== Plot ==
Tampha, a gorgeous young woman with a loving husband and a small daughter, lives a peaceful life in the Manipur valley, preoccupied with banal matters like preparing for her daughter's ear-piercing ceremony or discussing the purchase of a used scooter with her husband. Suddenly, she begins to act strangely, talking to flowers, having dizzy spells, and wandering out of the house in the middle of the night. The family goes from pillar to post in search of a treatment for the strange illness. Finally, they realise she is not suffering from a common illness, but rather is responding to the inexorable call of the deity.

Ishanou by Aribam Syam Sharma is a moving story of love and grief immersed in Manipuri culture. The video beautifully contrasts the spiritual world of the Maibis with the rhythm of everyday life, emphasising the coexistence of the occult and the tangible in the same reality. To the mesmerising sounds of the Pena (traditional string instrument), the bamboo flute, and incantation hymns, the drama unfolds. The director's straightforward approach, delicate camerawork, and understated acting, combined with the vivid depiction of Maibi culture and the use of Manipur's traditional music in the film's score, lend the film an authenticity that blends storytelling, documentary, and ethnography.

He claims that music was his first love. Aribam Syam Sharma, a singer, songwriter, actor, and theatrical director, studied philosophy, music, and drama before venturing into the field of movies. The film "Ishanou" (The Chosen One) is a palimpsest of this outstanding filmmaker's various talents, as well as another treasure that arose from the filmmaker's close collaboration with the famed Manipuri writer M.K. Binodini Devi, who penned the screenplay for the film.

Their shared interest in telling a story based on the life of the Maibi sect, Binodini Devi's observations and stories shared with her by Maibis, and Aribam Syam Sharma's documentary on Lai-Haraoba, an annual ritual festival celebrated by the Meitei community to appease the gods through songs, dance, and rituals performed by the Maibi, all contributed to the creation of the film.

== Cast ==
- Anoubam Kiranmala as Tampha
- Kangabam Tomba as Dhanabir, Tampha's Husband
- Baby Molly as Bembem, Tampha's Daughter
- Manbi as Tampha's Mother
- Soraisam Dhiren as Tampha's neighbour
- Baby Premita
- Nungshirei Maibi, Dhani Maibi
- Mema Maibi, Sakhen Maibi
- Tekpicha Maibi, Bino Maibi
- Sakhi Maibi, Mema Maibi
- Memcha Maibi, Rupobati Maibi

== Reception ==
Derek Malcolm, in 1991, wrote about the film on The Guardian, "Perhaps the best film in the panorama, largely because it tells a good story with great honesty and lack of guile, came from the State of Manipur, where two or three directors have worked against all odds for a decade or more". Former director of Sydney Film Festival and Film Critic David Stratton also wrote in the Variety published from New York on 11 April 1991, "One of the best Indian films of the past year, The Chosen One looks though it’ll make its way on the international film circuit. Specialized art house release also is possible".

== Accolades ==
Ishanou won the National Film Award for Best Feature Film in Manipuri and Special Mention (Anoubam Kiranmala) at the 38th National Film Awards. The citation for the National Award reads, "For effectively portraying the tragedy behind the institution of Maibi which unfortunately shatters a family". Special Mention's citation reads, "For a debut performance depicting various levels of conflict effectively".

Award	Category	Winner's name	Result
38th National Film Awards	Best Feature Film in Manipuri	Aribam Syam Sharma	Won
38th National Film Awards	Special Mention	Anoubam Kiranmala	Won

== Film restoration ==
Ishanou was restored by Film Heritage Foundation utilizing the best surviving elements, including the 16 mm original camera negative held by the National Film Archive of India and two 35 mm prints held by Aribam Syam Sharma. When conservators from the Film Heritage Foundation examined the negative, they discovered it was in poor condition. On some reels, the negative suffered vinegar syndrome degradation, mould and warping, broken perforations, scratches, emulsion halos, and base distortion. Conservators from the Film Heritage Foundation labored painstakingly to fix the negative before it could be digitized using a wet-gate scanner at L'Immagine Ritrovata in Bologna.

The significant issue was the usage of inter-negative areas in the original camera negative, which resulted in wide changes in image quality, making it quite grainy in parts and not matching the rest of the film. The sound design in this film is particularly essential because of the subtleties in the film's silence and, of course, the music composed by Aribam Syam Sharma. The film was shot on 16 mm on a low budget in varying available light circumstances, resulting in focus and lighting difficulties that damaged the image.

In keeping with its aim of restoring and revitalizing forgotten gems of India's film legacy, the Film Heritage Foundation has restored the award-winning film "Ishanou" (1990) by revered Manipuri filmmaker Aribam Syam Sharma. It was done in 2022. The restoration has been chosen for a red-carpet global premiere at the Cannes Film Festival's coveted Cannes Classic section in 2023. The 91-minute film was also an official entry in Cannes' Un Certain Regard division in 1991. Ishanou is just the second Manipuri feature film scanned by the SN Chand Cine Archive and the Museum of MSFDS, and the first to be restored.
