= 20th National Film Awards =

Indian ceremony celebrating cinema of 1972

- 20th National Film Awards
- Awarded for: Best of Indian cinema in 1972
- Awarded by: Ministry of Information and Broadcasting
- Official website: dff.nic.in

Highlights
- Best Feature Film: Swayamvaram
- Dadasaheb Phalke Award: Pankaj Kumar Mullick
- Most awards: Swayamvaram (4)

The 20th National Film Awards, presented by Ministry of Information and Broadcasting, India to felicitate the best of Indian Cinema released in the year 1972.

With this year, new award category is introduced for the feature films made in Meitei language. This newly introduced category includes President's Silver Medal for Best Feature Film in Manipuri.

== Juries ==
Six different committees were formed based on the film making sectors in India, mainly based in Bombay, Calcutta and Madras along with the central committee for all India level. For 20th National Film Awards, central committee was headed by Romesh Thapar.

- Jury Members: Central
  - Romesh Thapar (Chairperson) • Thakazhi Sivasankara Pillai • Rita Ray • Sheila Vats • Usha Bhagat • Girish Karnad (Not Attended) • M. Yunus Dehlvi • Teji Bachchan • Phanishwar Nath 'Renu' • Shanta Gandhi • U. Visweswar Rao • I. S. Johar (Not Attended) • Ardhendu Mukerjee
- Jury Members: Short Films
  - S. K. Kooka (Chairperson) • B. D. Garga • Prasanta Sanyal • Gerson Da Cunha • Aruna Vasudeva • Bishamber Khanna • Revati Saran Sharma • Din Dayal
- Jury Regional: Bombay
  - Ali Sardar Jafri (Chairperson) • Mrinalini Sarabhai • Charles Correa • Bikram Singh • Bhupendra Shah • Gopinath Talwalkar • D. G. Nadkarni • Kumud Mehta • Adi Marzban • P. K. Ravindranath • B. K. Adarsh • Atma Ram • G. P. Shirke • Kamleshwar
- Jury Regional: Calcutta
  - Sombhu Mitra (Chairperson) • Amina Kar • Suchitra Mitra • Sanat Lahiri • N. K. Ghosh • Bhaben Barua • Ramesh Chandra Dhall • Ananda Shankar • Badal Sarkar • B. N. Sircar
- Jury Regional: Calcutta - Nominated
  - Parimal Sarkar • Kanan Devi • Subodh Mitra • Elangbam Nilakanta Singh • Maharaj Kumari Binodini Devi
- Jury Regional: Madras
  - Malcolm Adiseshiah (Chairperson) • B. N. Reddy • A. L. Velliappa • Mahmooda Haja Shareef • S. Ananthamurthy • Thoppil Ravi • V. C. Subburaman • P. S. Ramakrishna Rao • K. P. Kottarakkara • Rajammal Anantharaman • P. C. Mathew

== Awards ==
Awards were divided into feature films and non-feature films.

President's Gold Medal for the All India Best Feature Film is now better known as National Film Award for Best Feature Film, whereas President's Gold Medal for the Best Documentary Film is analogous to today's National Film Award for Best Non-Feature Film. For children's films, Prime Minister's Gold Medal is now given as National Film Award for Best Children's Film. At the regional level, President's Silver Medal for Best Feature Film is now given as National Film Award for Best Feature Film in a particular language. Certificate of Merit in all the categories is discontinued over the years.

=== Lifetime Achievement Award ===
Name of Award	Image	Awardee(s)	Awarded As	Awards
Dadasaheb Phalke Award		Pankaj Mullick	Music Director	₹11,000, a shawl and a plaque

=== Feature films ===
Feature films were awarded at All India as well as regional level. For 20th National Film Awards, a Malayalam film Swayamvaram won the President's Gold Medal for the All India Best Feature Film along with winning the maximum number of awards (four). Following were the awards given in each category:

==== All India Award ====
Following were the awards given:

Award	Film	Language	Awardee(s)	Cash prize
Best Feature Film	Swayamvaram	Malayalam	Producer: Kulathoor Bhaskaran Nair	Gold Medal and ₹40,000
Best Feature Film	Swayamvaram	Malayalam	Director: Adoor Gopalakrishnan	₹10,000 and a plaque
Second Best Feature Film	Calcutta 71	Bengali	Producer: D. S. Sultania	₹15,000 and a medal
Second Best Feature Film	Calcutta 71	Bengali	Director: Mrinal Sen	₹5,000 and a plaque
Best Feature Film on National Integration	Achanum Bappayum	Malayalam	Producer: C. C. Baby	₹30,000 and a medal
Best Feature Film on National Integration	Achanum Bappayum	Malayalam	Director: K. S. Sethumadhavan	₹10,000 and a plaque
Best Direction	Swayamvaram	Malayalam	Adoor Gopalakrishnan	₹ 5,000 and a plaque
Best Cinematography (Black and White)	Swayamvaram	Malayalam	Mankada Ravi Varma	₹5,000 and a plaque
Best Cinematography (Color)	Maya Darpan	Hindi	K. K. Mahajan	₹5,000 and a plaque
Best Screenplay	Koshish	Hindi	Gulzar	₹ 5,000 and a plaque
Best Actor (Bharat Award)	Koshish	Hindi	Sanjeev Kumar	A figurine
Best Actress (Urvashi Award)	Swayamvaram	Malayalam	Sharada	A figurine
Best Child Artist	Ranur Pratham Bhag	Bengali	Neera Mallya	A plaque
Best Female Playback Singer	Parichay (For the song "Beeti Naa Bitaai Raina")	Hindi	Lata Mangeshkar	A plaque
Best Male Playback Singer	Achanum Bappayum	Malayalam	K. J. Yesudas	A plaque
Best Music Direction	Zindagi Zindagi	Hindi	Sachin Dev Burman	₹ 5,000 and a plaque
Lyric Writer of the Best Film Song on National Integration	Achanum Bappayum	Malayalam	Vayalar Ramavarma	₹ 5,000 and a plaque

==== Regional Award ====
The awards were given to the best films made in the regional languages of India. For feature films in English, Kashmiri, Oriya and Punjabi language, President's Silver Medal for Best Feature Film was not given. The producer and director of the film were awarded with ₹5,000 and a Silver medal, respectively.

Award	Film	Awardee(s)	
Award	Film	Producer	Director
Best Feature Film in Assamese	Upaja Sonar Maati	M/s Pragati Cine Productions	Brajen Barua
Best Feature Film in Bengali	Strir Patra	Dhrupadi	Purnendu Patri
Best Feature Film in Gujarati	Gun Sundarino Ghar Sansar	Ramesh H. Saraiya	Govind Saraiya
Best Feature Film in Gujarati	Gun Sundarino Ghar Sansar	Jayant Malaviya	Govind Saraiya
Best Feature Film in Gujarati	Gun Sundarino Ghar Sansar	Chandulal Gandhi	Govind Saraiya
Best Feature Film in Hindi	Maya Darpan	Kumar Shahani	Kumar Shahani
Best Feature Film in Kannada	Sharapanjara	C. S. Rajah	Puttanna Kanagal
Best Feature Film in Malayalam	Panitheeratha Veedu	K. S. R. Moorthy	K. S. Sethumadhavan
Best Feature Film in Manipuri	Matamgi Manipur	Karam Monomohan Singh	Debkumar Bose
Best Feature Film in Marathi	Pinjra	V. Shantaram	V. Shantaram
Best Feature Film in Tamil	Pattikada Pattanama	P. Madhavan	P. Madhavan
Best Feature Film in Telugu	Pandanti Kapuram	G. Hanumantha Rao	Lakshmi Deepak

=== Non-Feature films ===
Following were the awards given:

==== Short films ====
Name of Award	Name of Film	Language	Awardee(s)	Awards
Best Information Film (Documentary)	The Inner Eye	English	Producer: Satyajit Ray	₹5,000 and a medal
Best Information Film (Documentary)	The Inner Eye	English	Director: Satyajit Ray	₹5,000 and a medal
Best Film on Social Documentation	Transcedence	English	Producer: Pramod Patil for Films Division	₹5,000
Best Film on Social Documentation	Transcedence	English	Director: K. Vishwanath for Films Division	₹2,000
Best Promotional Film (Commercial)	Destination India	English	Producer: Cinerad Communications	Silver Medal
Best Promotional Film (Commercial)	Destination India	English	Director: Zafar Hai	A plaque
Best Animation Film	You Said It	English	Producer: Prasad Productions	₹5,000
Best Animation Film	You Said It	English	Director: Ram Mohan	₹2,000

=== Awards not given ===
Following were the awards not given as no film was found to be suitable for the award:

- Best Story Writer
- Best Film on Family Welfare
- Best Children's Film
- Best Educational / Instructional Film
- Best Experimental Film
- Best Promotional Film (Non-Commercial)
- President's Silver Medal for Best Feature Film in English
- President's Silver Medal for Best Feature Film in Oriya
- President's Silver Medal for Best Feature Film in Punjabi
