= Lamja Parshuram =

- Movie Poster
- Directed by: Aribam Syam Sharma
- Screenplay by: Elangbam Dinamani Singh
- Story by: G.C. Tongbra
- Produced by: G. Narayan Sharma
- Starring: Kangabam Tomba; Wahengbam Bedamani
- Cinematography: Sankar Banerjee; Chief assistant: Bishu Mukherjee; Stills: Subhash Nandi
- Edited by: Madhusudan Banerjee
- Music by: Aribam Syam Sharma; Assistant: Khun Joykumar; Music arranger: Robin Sarkar; Sound recordist: Bani Dutta, R.C.A. Amuly Das (outdoor)
- Production company: N.S. Films
- Distributed by: N.S. Films
- Release date: 24 April 1974
- Running time: 139 minutes
- Country: India
- Language: Meiteilon (Manipuri)

Lamja Parshuram is a 1974 Manipuri film directed by Aribam Syam Sharma and produced by G. Narayan Sharma for N.S. Films. The script was written by Elangbam Dinamani Singh and story by G.C. Tongbra. The movie features Kangabam Tomba in the title role, and Wahengbam Bedamani as the lead female protagonist. It was released on 24 April 1974 at Pratap Talkies, Paona Bazar. The film ran for more than 100 days and became the first Manipuri hit feature film.

The indoor shooting of the film was done at Calcutta Movietone Studio. Lamja Parshuram was processed by Gauri Mukherjee at United Cine Laboratory. Khun Joykumar wrote the credit titles for the film. It is the debut feature film directed by Aribam Syam Sharma. From the movie, the leading actor Kangabam Tomba has since been popularly known as Lamja Tomba.

== Synopsis ==
The theme of the film is about an orphan Parshuram who grows up on his own. His maternal uncle sells his mother to a cruel rich man. He perceives that all these happenings are caused by his father who neglects them. And he takes a vow to kill his estranged father when he finds him. It is a heart touching journey of an orphan who always fights hardship.

(Meghachandra Kongbam, Imphal Review of Arts and Politics)

== Cast ==
- Kangabam Tomba as Parshuram
- Wahengbam Bedamani as Indrani
- G. Narayan Sharma as Parshuram's father
- Yengkhom Roma as Parshuram's mother
- Huirem Manglem as Tomal
- Kshetrimayum Rashi as Kethabi
- Gurumayum Jayantakumar as Parshuram (Child)

== Accolades ==
Kangabam Tomba won the Best Actor Award for his role in the film at the 1st Manipur State Film Awards 1984.

== Soundtrack ==
Aribam Syam Sharma composed the soundtrack for the film and Khuraijam Phulendra Singh wrote the lyrics. The movie has four songs sung by Aheibam Syam Sharma, Chongtham Kamala, Khun Joykumar and Kshetrimayum Rashi. The gramophone records were done by His Master's Voice.

Lamja Parshuram

Soundtrack album by Aheibam Syam Sharma, Khun Joykumar, Chongtham Kamala, Kshetrimayum Rashi
- Released: 1974
- Genre: Feature film soundtrack
- Length: 14:22
- Label: N.S. Films
- Producer: G. Narayan Sharma

No.	Title	Lyrics	Singer(s)	Length
1.	"Lamja"	Kh. Phulendra Singh	Aheibam Shyam Sharma	01:39
2.	"Imagi Mamou"	Kh. Phulendra Singh	Khun Joykumar, Kshetrimayum Rashi	04:15
3.	"Ngaorehe Eidi Sumhatle Nangna"	Kh. Phulendra Singh	Khun Joykumar, Chongtham Kamala	04:58
4.	"Nangdi Chatle Taklamdana"	Kh. Phulendra Singh	Chongtham Kamala	04:30
Total length:				14:22
