= Saaphabee =

1976 Indian film

- Official Poster
- Directed by: Aribam Syam Sharma
- Screenplay by: Sarangthem Bormani
- Story by: Sarangthem Bormani
- Produced by: G. Narayan Sharma
- Starring: Kangabam Tomba; Laishram Subadani
- Cinematography: Deojibhai Padhiar
- Edited by: Madhusudan Banerjee
- Music by: Aribam Syam Sharma
- Production company: N.S. Films
- Distributed by: N.S. Films
- Release date: 13 July 1976
- Running time: 116 minutes
- Country: India
- Language: Meiteilon (Manipuri)

Saaphabee is a 1976 Manipuri film written by Sarangthem Bormani, produced by G. Narayan Sharma and directed by Aribam Syam Sharma. The film features Kangabam Tomba and Laishram Subadani in the lead roles. It was released at Usha Cinema, Paona Bazar on 13 July 1976. The movie won the National Film Award for Best Feature Film in Manipuri at the 24th National Film Awards. It is based on the famous Manipuri folk play Haorang Leishang Saaphabee. It is the first Manipuri folk film.

== Cast ==
- Kangabam Tomba as Loya Naha Saaphaba
- Laishram Subadani as Haorang Leishang Saaphabee
- Manbi as Saaphabee's mother
- N. Tombi as Tabung, King of Kege region, Saaphabee's father
- Soraisam Keshoram as Thongnang, King of Khuman region, Saaphaba's father
- Kshetrimayum Rashi as Saaphabee's friend
- Elangbam Indu as Saaphabee's friend
- Babu
- Shanti
- Gouri
- Open

== Soundtrack ==
Aribam Syam Sharma composed the soundtrack for the film and Konsaba Ibochou and G. Joykumar Sharma wrote the lyrics. The movie has four songs sung by Aheibam Syam Sharma, Arambam Jamuna and Khun Joykumar.

Saaphabee

Soundtrack album by Aheibam Syam Sharma, Arambam Jamuna, Khun Joykumar
- Released: 1976
- Genre: Feature film soundtrack
- Length: 18:19
- Label: N.S. Films
- Producer: G. Narayan Sharma

No.	Title	Singer(s)	Length
1.	"Mapok Langol Khudingda"	Aheibam Shyam Sharma, Arambam Jamuna	04:39
2.	"Eidi Pakhang Shareeni"	Khun Joykumar	04:06
3.	"Khoyumgumna Saklotpa"	Arambam Jamuna Devi	04:28
4.	"Ngasi Korou Nongjada"	Aheibam Syam Sharma, Arambam Jamuna	05:06
Total length:			18:19
