= Imagi Ningthem =

Imagi Ningthem (My Son, My Precious)
- Poster
- Directed by: Aribam Syam Sharma
- Screenplay by: M. K. Binodini Devi
- Story by: M. K. Binodini Devi
- Produced by: K. Ibohal Sharma
- Starring: Ingudam Mangi; Taorem Leikhendra; Kshetrimayum Rashi
- Cinematography: K. Ibohal Sharma
- Edited by: Madhusudan Banerjee
- Music by: Khun Joykumar
- Distributed by: X-Cine
- Release date: 4 May 1981
- Running time: 110 minutes
- Country: India
- Language: Meiteilon (Manipuri)

Imagi Ningthem (English: My Son, My Precious) is a 1981 Manipuri film directed by Aribam Syam Sharma and written by M. K. Binodini Devi. It won the Golden Montgolfiere at the Festival des 3 Continents, Nantes in 1982. The film was also screened at many International Film Festivals, which include Denver International Film Festival, London Film Festival, Locarno International Film Festival, Montreal International Film Festival and International Film Festival of India. It won two awards at the 29th National Film Awards.

Imagi Ningthem was released at Usha Cinema, Paona Bazar on 4 May 1981. It is adapted from the radio play of the same title. The movie was the first Manipuri film to participate in the Indian Panorama of the International Film Festival of India.

== Plot ==
The film opens with Dhani travelling to her new place of posting. Dhani is welcomed by Gandhar at the location, where he takes her around the school and introduces the students. Thoithoi, a student at the school and his Pupu (grandfather) comes to Dhani to ask her if she can tutor Thoithoi since he is weak in academics as he could not attend school regularly. Dhani agrees to tutoring him. Over the course of time, Dhani starts feeling sympathy for Thoithoi and starts to inquire about his parents to Gandhar's wife. From her, she learns that Pupu is Thoithoi's maternal grandfather.

Gandhar tells Dhani that Thoithoi's grandfather was working as an attendant in the Inspection Bungalow. He had a daughter Memtombi, who was free-spirited. An officer who was posted at the place and lived at the bungalow, seduced Memtombi, but soon got transferred. When Memtombi's father learned about his daughter's pregnancy, he went to tell the officer about it, but the officer didn't come. Instead, he sent a man for Memtombi, to whom she refused. Memtombi died while giving birth to Thoithoi. After learning the story, Dhani is disturbed and asks Gandhar about the officer. She learns that he is Dinachandra from Elang Leikai, who happens to be her cousin Ekashini's husband. She goes to meet him. But at the time, Dinachandra was out of station for a training programme, and also for meeting his son who was studying in Delhi. So, Dhani tells Ekashini about what all happened, to which Ekashini initially denies and refuses to believe.

Ekashini goes to meet Thoithoi but isn't able to meet him as he is not at home at that time. Pishak tells Thoithoi that his mother came to meet him. During the second time, he meets Ekashini, where he thinks that she is his mother. She brings clothes and snacks for him. After a brief meeting, when Ekashini is about to leave, Thoithoi asks her not to leave and starts crying. Ekashini leaves but feels the pain of separation with Thoithoi, who addresses her as mother. The next day, Thoithoi waits for her mother by the roadside. Soon, Thoithoi falls ill. Ekashini comes to visit him. She takes Thoithoi to her residence and also consults a doctor. Pupu doesn't want his grandson to be kept there. Dhani asks Ekashini to send Thoithoi back, but instead tells her to admit Thoithoi to a nearby school. Ekashini looks after Thoithoi with utmost care and the mother-son relationship solidifies.

Meanwhile, Dinachandra returns home and starts inquiring Ekashini about Thoithoi. Ekashini does not disclose the story but only tells him that she adopted him just because she likes him and there won't be any problem with it afterwards. When she tells Dinachandra that the child is from the village where Dhani is posted, her husband insists that he will call Dhani to send the child back. Ekashini plans to make Thoithoi play the role of Lord Krishna for a Raas Leela performance, so she takes Thoithoi to a nearby Hindu temple for learning the dance regularly. During one of these days, Pupu comes to take Thoithoi where he meets Dinachandra. Pupu clarifies to him that he has no intention of making his grandson get adopted by a person who doesn't even want to adopt his own child and that, he himself is enough for Thoithoi. Dinachandra goes to call Ekashini and Thoithoi. Pupu tells Ekashini that he is taking Thoithoi back, to which Ekashini expresses her anger towards her husband for allowing it. She refuses and takes Thoithoi back to the Hindu temple. The grandfather, on seeing the mother-son bond, cries and leaves. The film ends with Ekashini correcting a step of the Thoithoi's Krishna dance, showing her love for her son, her precious.

== Cast ==
- Ingudam Mangi as Pupu, Thoithoi's grandfather
- Taorem Leikhendra as Thoithoi
- Thokchom Ongbi Jamini as Dhani, Ekashini's cousin
- Kshetrimayum Rashi as Ekashini
- Huirem Manglem as Gandhar
- Aribam Gayatri as Pishak
- Sagolsem Indrakumar as Dinachandra, Ekashini's husband
- Bhubaneshwari as Memtombi

== Accolades ==
Imagi Ningthem won the National Film Award for Best Feature Film in Manipuri and Best Child Artist Award (Leikhendra Singh) at the 29th National Film Awards. The citation for the National Award reads, "For its charm, simplicity and freshness of approach." Best Child Artist Award's citation reads, "For an endearing portrayal of a child and his yearning for a mother's love." This film is the only Indian film to ever win the Golden Montgolfiere at the Festival des 3 Continents in France.

Award	Category	Winner's name	Result
29th National Film Awards	Best Feature Film in Manipuri	Producer: K. Ibohal Sharma; Director: Aribam Syam Sharma	Won
29th National Film Awards	Best Child Artist	Leikhendra Singh	Won
Festival des 3 Continents 1982	Golden Montgolfiere	Director: Aribam Syam Sharma	Won
1st Manipur State Film Awards 1984	Best Feature Film	Producer: K. Ibohal Sharma; Director: Aribam Syam Sharma	Won
