= Three Continents Festival =

Film festival

Coordinates: 47°13′N 1°33′W

Festival des 3 Continents
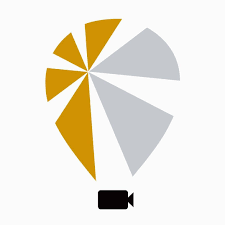
- Location: Nantes, France
- Founded: 1979
- Founded by: Philippe and Alain Jalladeau
- Awards: Montgolfière d'or
- Artistic director: Jérôme Baron
- Website: http://www.3continents.com/

The Three Continents Festival (French: Festival des 3 Continents) is an annual film festival held since 1979 in Nantes, France, devoted to the cinemas of Asia, Africa, and Latin America. It was founded by Philippe and Alain Jalladeau. The top award in the festival's competition is the balloon-shaped Montgolfiere d'or. In conjunction with the festival is the Produire au Sud ("Producers of the South"), a project that provides funding to independent film productions from Asia, Africa, and Latin America.

On the occasion of the twentieth anniversary of Produire au Sud in 2021, Director Guillaume Mainguet organised a retrospective and commissioned a series of interviews, produced by Julia Hammett-Jamart.

== List of Montgolfière d'or winners ==
| Year | Film | Director | Country of origin |
|---|---|---|---|
| 1979 | Baara | Souleymane Cissé | Mali |
| 1980 | Chafika et Metwal | Aly Badrakhan | Egypt |
| 1981 | They Don't Wear Black Tie | Leon Hirszman | Brazil |
| 1981 | Plae Kao | Cherd Songsri | Thailand |
| 1982 | Imagi Ningthem | Aribam Syam Sharma | India |
| 1983 | Angela Markado | Lino Brocka | The Philippines |
| 1984 | The Wanderers | Nacer Khemir | Tunisia |
| 1984 | The Boys from Fengkuei | Hou Hsiao-hsien | Taiwan |
| 1985 | The Runner | Amir Naderi | Iran |
| 1985 | A Summer at Grandpa's | Hou Hsiao-hsien | Taiwan |
| 1986 | In the Wild Mountains | Yan Xueshu | China |
| 1987 | Motherland Hotel | Ömer Kavur | Turkey |
| 1988 | Rouge | Stanley Kwan | Hong Kong |
| 1989 | Water, Wind, Dust | Amir Naderi | Iran |
| 1990 | Untamagiru | Gō Takamine | Japan |
| 1991 | Five Girls and a Rope | Yeh Hung-wei | Taiwan |
| 1992 | Bloody Morning | Li Shaohong | China |
| 1993 | For Fun | Ning Ying | China |
| 1994 | Dos crímenes | Roberto Sneider | Mexico |
| 1995 | Sender Unknown | Carlos Carrera | Mexico |
| 1996 | A True Story | Abolfazl Jalili | Iran |
| 1997 | Made in Hong Kong | Fruit Chan | Hong Kong |
| 1998 | After Life | Hirokazu Koreeda | Japan |
| 1998 | Xiao Wu | Jia Zhangke | China |
| 1999 | Luna Papa | Bakhtyar Khudojnazarov | Tajikistan |
| 2000 | Platform | Jia Zhangke | China |
| 2001 | Delbaran | Abolfazl Jalili | Iran |
| 2002 | My Brother Silk Road | Marat Sarulu | Kyrgyzstan/Kazakhstan |
| 2003 | Seven Days, Seven Nights | Joel Cano | Cuba |
| 2004 | Day and Night | Wang Chao | China |
| 2005 | Angel's Fall | Semih Kaplanoglu | Greece/Turkey |
| 2006 | A Few Kilos of Dates for a Funeral | Saman Salur | Iran |
| 2008 | Parque vía | Enrique Rivero | Mexico |
| 2014 | Hill of Freedom | Hong Sang-soo | South Korea |
| 2015 | Kaili Blues | Bi Gan | China |
| 2016 | In the Last Days of the City | Tamer El Said | Egypt |
| 2017 | Taming the Horse | Tao Gu | China |
| 2018 | Memories of My Body | Garin Nugroho | Indonesia |
| 2019 | Öndög | Wang Quan'an | China |
| 2020 | Moving On | Yoon Dan Bi | South Korea |
| 2020 | Zero | Kazuhiro Sôda | Japan, USA |
| 2021 | Wheel of Fortune and Fantasy | Ryûsuke Hamaguchi | Japan |
| 2022 | Glorious Ashes | Bùi Thạc Chuyên | Vietnam |
| 2025 | The World of Love | Yoon Ga-eun | South Korea |
