= Matamgi Manipur =

- ꯃꯇꯝꯒꯤ ꯃꯅꯤꯄꯨꯔ
- Directed by: Debkumar Bose
- Written by: Lokendra Arambam (dialogue)
- Screenplay by: Debkumar Bose
- Story by: Arambam Samarendra
- Produced by: Karam Monomohan
- Starring: G. Ravindra Sharma; Yengkhom Roma
- Cinematography: Shankar Banerjee; Stills: Subhash Nandi
- Edited by: Madhusudan Banerjee
- Music by: Aribam Syam Sharma; Music arranger: Dilip Roy; Sound recordist: Bani Dutta, R.C.A. Anil Talukdar (outdoor)
- Production company: K.T. Films Private Limited
- Distributed by: K.T. Films Private Limited
- Release date: 9 April 1972
- Running time: 106 minutes
- Country: India
- Language: Meiteilon (Manipuri)

Matamgi Manipur (Meitei: ꯃꯇꯝꯒꯤ ꯃꯅꯤꯄꯨꯔ, English: The Times of Manipur) is a 1972 Manipuri film and the first full-length cinema of Manipur. The movie is directed by Debkumar Bose and produced by Karam Monomohan, under the banner of K.T. (Karam Tomal) Films Private Limited. The black and white film features Gurumayum Ravindra Sharma and Yengkhom Roma in the lead roles. Arambam Samarendra wrote the story and screenplay by Debkumar Bose. The film won the President's Medal (Rashtriya Chalchitra Purashkar) at the 20th National Film Awards. It is an adaptation of Arambam Samarendra's theatrical play Tīrtha Yātrā.

In remembrance of the occasion of release of this first feature film of Manipur, every year, April 9 is celebrated as Mami Numit (English: Cinema Day) in the state. The film was processed at United Cine Laboratory under the supervision of Gauri Mukherjee. The credit titles (Meitei Mayek script) were written by Khun Joykumar.

The film began shooting on 3 December 1971 and was wrapped up in January 1972.

== Plot ==
The film tells the story of a middle-class family with members who adhere to both new and old societal values. Their diametrically opposed attitudes pull them in different directions.

Tonsna, a retired Amin, has two sons, Ibohal and Ibotombi, and a daughter, Tondonbi. Ibohal is a fashionable, easy-going, spoilt young man. His wife Tampak wants to live the life of a virtuous, ideal housewife. Ibotombi is a progressive young man who challenges all old values and is angry that people do not understand the need to change their beliefs. Tondonbi, the sister, is a college student with ultra-modern ideas about life. She wants to enjoy life, making the best of every situation. Tonsa does not take the trouble to guide his children or help them adjust to a society that is slowly changing. The result is that Ibotombi is frustrated because the world does not change as fast as he would like, and Ibotombi makes a mess of his life. Tondonbi also ends up miserable and desperate.

It seems that the family is destined to disintegrate, but then they begin to understand each other better and decide to live together happily ever after.

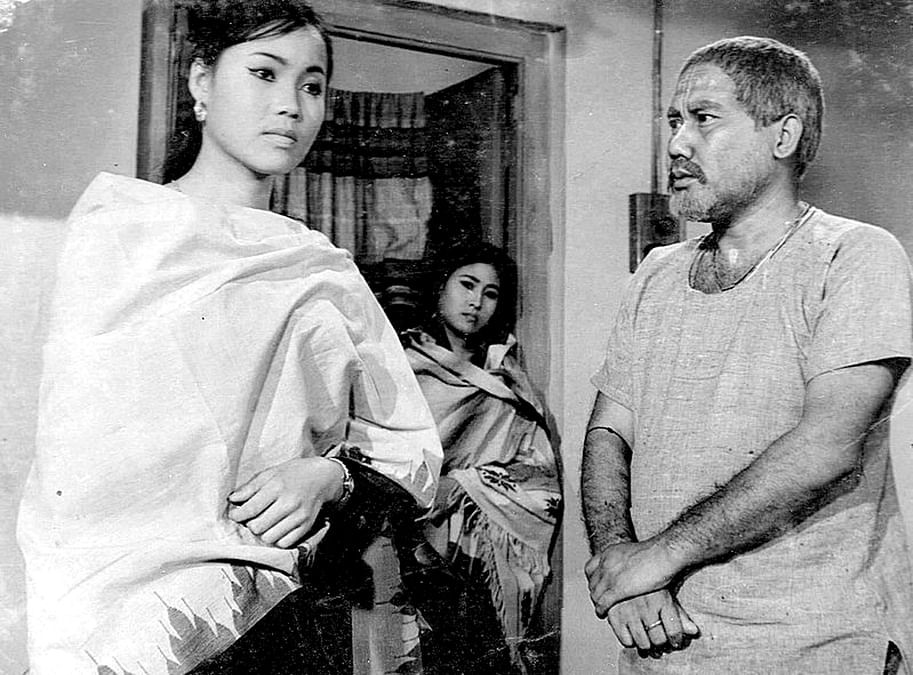
A scene from the film

== Cast ==
- Gurumayum Ravindra Sharma as Ibohal
- Yengkhom Roma as Tampak, Ibohal's wife
- Kangabam Birbabu as Ibotombi, Ibohal's younger brother
- Aribam Syam Sharma as Tonsna, Ibohal's father
- Elangbam Indira as Tondonbi, Ibotombi's younger sister
- Kshetrimayum Rashi as Sunita
- Wahengbam Bedamani as Memcha, Ibotombi's girlfriend
- Baby Ameeta as Ibohal's daughter
- Lokendra Arambam as Secretary at Secretariat Office
- Dr. Moirangthem Nara as Doctor
- Amujao
- Kangabam Tomba as Birjit
- Okendra

== Soundtrack ==
Aribam Syam Sharma composed the soundtrack for the film and Khuraijam Phulendra and M. K. Binodini Devi wrote the lyrics. The playback singers are Chongtham Kamala, Arambam Jamuna and Aheibam Budhachandra. The gramophone records were done by His Master's Voice.

Matamgi Manipur

Soundtrack album by Chongtham Kamala, Aheibam Budhachandra, Arambam Jamuna
- Released: 1972
- Genre: Feature film soundtrack
- Length: 15:12
- Label: K.T. Films Private Limited
- Producer: Karam Monomohan

| No. | Title | Lyrics | Singer(s) | Length |
|---|---|---|---|---|
| 1. | "Lapna Lotna Leiyu" | M. K. Binodini Devi | Chongtham Kamala | 03:53 |
| 2. | "Eigi Punshi Kari Thoknei Nangga" | Khuraijam Phulendra | Aheibam Budhachandra | 03:52 |
| 3. | "Tha Tha Thabungton" | Khuraijam Phulendra | Chongtham Kamala | 04:11 |
| 4. | "Chatli Chatli Mapham Khuding" | Khuraijam Phulendra | Aheibam Budhachandra, Arambam Jamuna | 03:16 |
| Total length: | | | | 15:12 |

== Books ==
Bobby Wahengbam wrote a book on the film titled Matamgi Manipur: The First Manipuri Feature Film. For the book, he won the Golden Lotus (Swarna Kamal) Award for Best Book on Cinema at the 65th National Film Awards held in 2018.

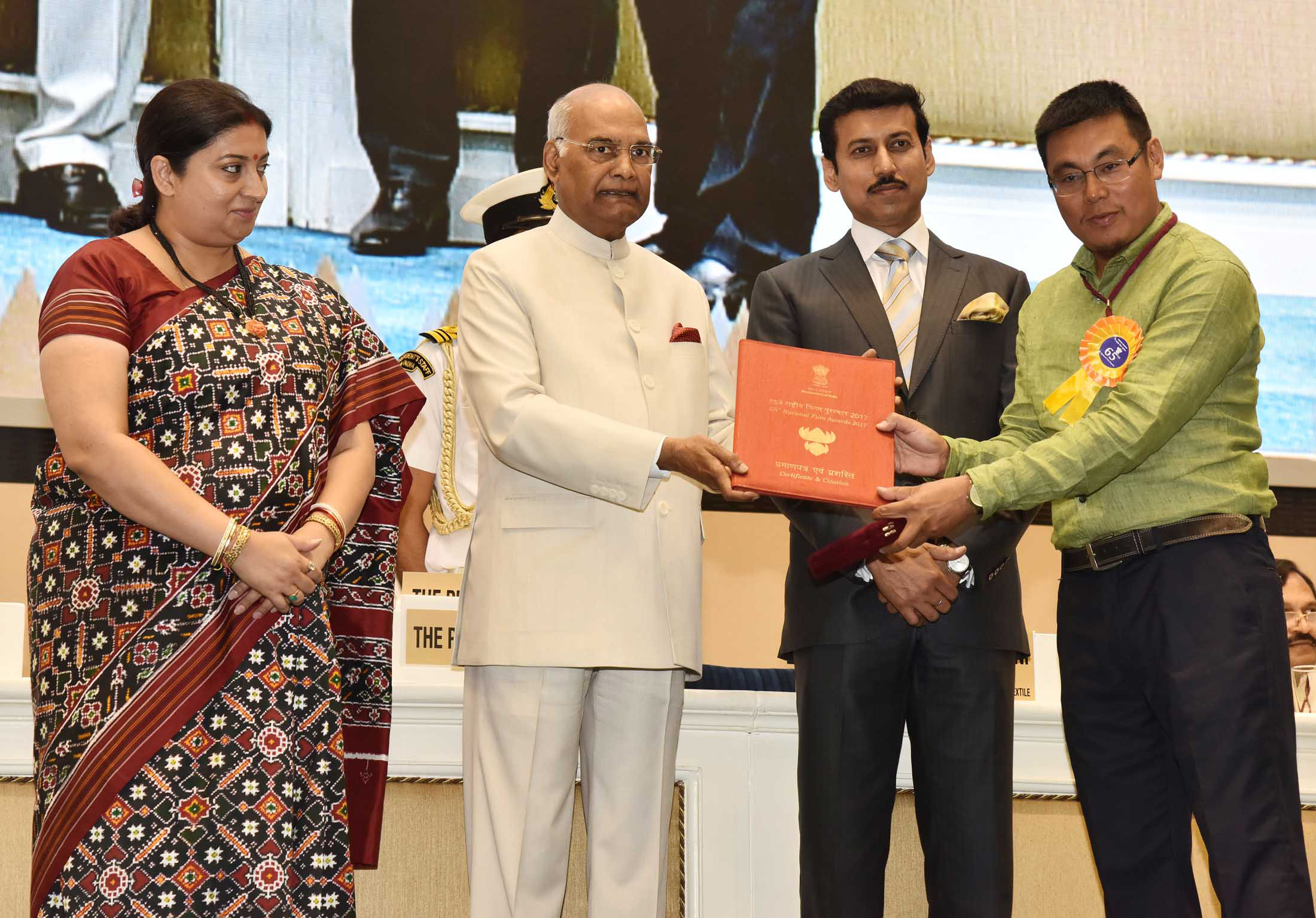
Bobby Wahengbam receiving the Swarna Kamal Award from the President, Shri Ram Nath Kovind at the 65th National Film Awards.

== In popular culture ==
Haobam Paban Kumar made a documentary film named as The First Leap in 2008. It is about the get together of the cast and crew of Matamgi Manipur on a fine day in the 2000s, watching the movie, recollecting the sweet memories and having lunch.
