= Aribam Syam Sharma =

Indian film director

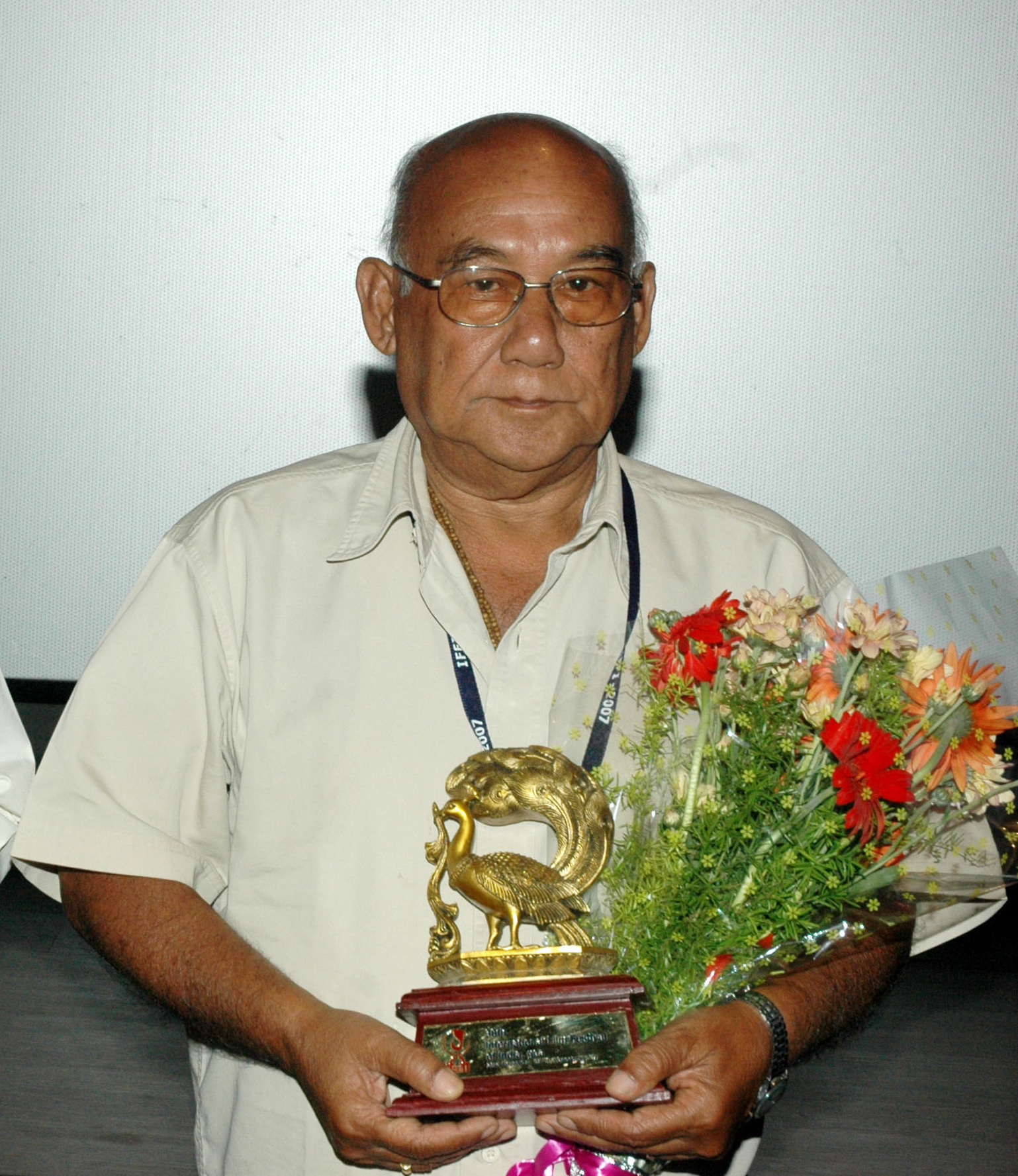
- Born: 21 March 1936 (age 90); Imphal, Manipur, India
- Occupations: Film director, Singer, Music composer
- Awards: Golden Montgolfiere (1982); Padma Shri (2006); V. Shantaram Lifetime Achievement Award (2008); Kamal Kumari National Award (2009); Jewel of Manipuri Cinema (2015)
- Website: aribamsyamsharma.in

Aribam Syam Sharma is an Indian filmmaker and composer from Manipur. He debuted in the first Manipuri film Matamgi Manipur as an actor. In 1974, he directed his first movie Lamja Parshuram. It became the first Manipuri film to run for 100 days in the box office. His 1979 film Olangthagee Wangmadasoo was the first ever and the only Manipuri film to run for 32 weeks. It also broke the local box office records of Sholay.

His fourth film as a director, Imagi Ningthem (My Son, My precious) brought him international recognition when the film received the Montgolfiere d' Or at the Festival of Three Continents, Nantes in 1982.

His 1990 film Ishanou (The Chosen One) was screened in the Un Certain Regard section at the 1991 Cannes Film Festival.

In 2006, the Government of India awarded Sharma with the Padmashri, but he returned the award in February 2019 to protest against the Indian Government's decision to enact the Citizenship Amendment Bill of 2019.

In recognition of his contribution in the Indian documentary cinema, the Government of India conferred him Dr. V. Shantaram Lifetime Achievement Award in the 10th Mumbai International Film Festival, 2008 organised by the Films Division. Syam Sharma was given the Lifetime Achievement Award at the 7th Manipur State Film Festival 2010. He was also conferred with the Jewel of Manipuri Cinema award on 14 May 2015 by the Film Forum Manipur and the Manipur State Film Development Society.

== Filmography ==
=== Feature films ===
Year	Title	Role	Notes
1972	Matamgi Manipur	Actor, Music Director	First Manipuri full-length feature film. The movie bagged the President's Medal at the 20th National Film Awards.
1974	Lamja Parshuram	Director, Music Director	His debut film as a director.
1976	Saaphabee	Director	Best Feature Film in Manipuri at the 24th National Film Awards.
1979	Olangthagee Wangmadasoo	Director	Best Feature Film in Manipuri at the 27th National Film Awards.
1981	Imagi Ningthem	Director, Music Director	First Indian film to win Grand Prix Award at Nantes. Best Feature Film in Manipuri at the 29th National Film Awards.
1983	Paokhum Ama	Director	Screened at Tyneside International Film Festival, U.K.
1990	Ishanou	Director, Music Director	Screened at the Un Certain Regard section of the 1991 Cannes International Film Festival. Best Feature Film in Manipuri at the 38th National Film Awards.
1995	Sanabi	Director, Music Director	Selected for Cairo International Film Festival, Egypt and IFFI. Best Feature Film in Manipuri at the 43rd National Film Awards.
1998	Shingnaba	Director	Film on superstitions and beliefs in Manipur and HIV menace.
2000	Paari	Director	First Manipuri children film.
2003	Ashangba Nongjabi	Director, Producer, Music Director	Adapted from M. K. Binodini Devi's famous 1966 play of the same title.
2008	Crossroads	Director	Film on a group of friends and their aspirations to establish a rock band in Manipur.
2011	Miraang	Director	Based on Arambam Samarendra's play of the same title.
2012	Leipaklei	Director	Screened at Jeonju International Film Festival, South Korea. Best Feature Film in Manipuri at the 60th National Film Awards.
2013	Dasha	Director	Based on Arambam Samarendra's play of the same title.
2019	Nongphadok Lakpa Atithi	Music Director, Screenplay Writer, Director	Premiered at the 3rd Guwahati_International_Film_Festival as the Opening Film of the Indian Section.

=== Non-feature films ===
Year	Title	Role	Notes
1980	Sanaleibak Manipur	Director	Best Documentary Film in the Non-Feature category at the First Manipuri State Film Festival 1984.
1986	Tales of Courage	Director	Deals with the freedom struggle movement in Manipur, emphasising on the role of Manipuri women in the resistance against the British rule.
1988	Sangai: The Dancing Deer of Manipur	Director	Bagged five merit awards in the 12th International Wildlife Film Festival, Montana, U.S.A. Declared Outstanding Film of the Year by British Film Institute, London.
1988	Keibul Lamjao National Park	Director	Bagged the Best Documentary Film in 2nd Manipur State Film Awards 1994.
1988	Koro Kosii	Director	Participated in Indian Panorama of IFFI 1989. Screened at Indian Film Week, Hungary, 1989 and Bombay International Film Festival 1989.
1989	The Deer on the Lake	Director	National Film Award for Best Environment/Conservation/Preservation Film at the 37th National Film Awards.
1990	Indigenous Games of Manipur	Director	National Film Award for Best Exploration/Adventure Film at the 38th National Film Awards.
1991	Meitei Pung	Director	Special Mention Award at the 39th National Film Awards.
1991	Lai Haraoba	Director	Official selection in the Indian Panorama of the International Film Festival of India (IFFI), 1992.
1993	Orchids of Manipur	Director	Best Environment/Conservation/Preservation Film at the 41st National Film Awards. Screened at the Yamagata International Documentary Film Festival 2019, Japan. Participated in International Wildlife Film Festival, Morocco, 1994.
1995	Yelhou Jagoi	Director	National Film Award for Best Anthropological/Ethnographic Film at the 43rd National Film Awards. Opening film of the Indian Panorama of the IFFI in 1996. Screened at the Yamagata International Documentary Film Festival 2019, Japan.
1998	Loktak: The Dying Lake of Manipur	Director	
1999	Thang-Ta: The Martial Art of Manipur	Director	National Film Award for Best Arts/Cultural Film at the 47th National Film Awards.
1999	The Marams	Director	Participated at Indian Panorama of IFFI, 2000; Mumbai International Film Festival 2000 in Competition Section and Kathmandu International Mountain Film Festival, 2000.
2001	The Monpas of Arunachal Pradesh	Director	Best Anthropological/Ethnographic Film at the 49th National Film Awards.
2002	M.K. Binodini	Director	Documents the life of the renowned writer M. K. Binodini Devi.
2002	The Golden Hands	Director	A film on Manipuri traditional handloom continuing an age old cultural tradition.
2003	Pandit Khelchandra	Director	
2003	Binodini: A Writer's Life	Director	
2004	Neelamani: The Master Potter of Manipur	Director	Documents the life and achievements of the famous potter of Manipur Neelamani Devi.
2005	Guru Laimayum Thambalngoubi Devi	Director	National Film Award for Best Biographical Film at the 54th National Film Awards.
2007	Rajarshi Bhagyachandra of Manipur	Director	Selected for Indian Panorama in the non-feature section of the 38th International Film Festival of India 2007.
2008	Mr. Manipur	Director	Screened at the Mahindra Indo-American Arts Council (MIAAC) Film Festival 2008.
2008	Leirol	Director	A non-feature film on the oral folk literature describing flowers.
2009	Sankirtan of Manipur	Director	
2011	Leaders from the Below	Director	
2012	Manipuri Pony	Director	National Film Award for Best Exploration/Adventure Film (Including sports) at the 60th National Film Awards.
2014	Kangla	Director	
2018	Raas Leelas of Manipur	Director	Won the Best Non-Feature Film Award at the 12th Manipur State Film Awards 2019.
2019	E. Sonamani Singh	Director	
2022	Khumanthem Prakash Singh	Music Director, Script & Director	Won the Best Biographical / Arts & Culture Film Award at the 15th Manipur State Film Awards 2023.

== Bibliography ==
Year	Work	Ref.
2006	Living Shadows	
2014	Eshei Binodinigi	
2014	Modern Manipuri Music and Me	
2016	Manipuri Cinema: Eigi Paodam	
2022	Critics on Indian Cinema	

== In popular culture ==
Documentary films focussing on the life and the filmmaking career of Aribam Syam Sharma was made by Gurumayum Nirmal Sharma and Thoudam Brajabidhu.

Another non-feature film on the filmmaker titled Pabung Syam was also made in 2020 by Haobam Paban Kumar and produced by Films Division of India. The film was selected at the 52nd International Film Festival of India 2021 in the non-feature section of Indian Panorama.
