= Son Moina =

- Directed by: Siva Prasad Thakur
- Screenplay by: Siva Prasad Thakur
- Story by: Ranjan Roy
- Based on: Bengali play Saaheb
- Produced by: R.B. Mehta; N.P.N. Nayar; Siva Prasad Takhur
- Starring: Pranjal Saikia; Suren Mahanta; Purabi Sarma
- Cinematography: Indukalpa Hazarika
- Edited by: Rasbihari Sinha
- Music by: Basanta-Manik
- Release date: 1985
- Running time: 135 minutes
- Country: India
- Language: Assmese

Son Moina (Assamese: সোণ মইনা)) is a 1985 Assamese language drama film, directed by Siva Prasad Thakur. The film is produced by R.B. Mehta, N.P.N. Nayar and Siva Prasad Takhur under the banner of RB Productions. It is based on a Bengali play Saaheb by Ranjan Roy. It may be noted that based on this play, two another films were also made in Bengali and Hindi, titled Saaheb in 1981 and 1985 respectively. This film was awarded as Best Assamese Film in 32nd National Film Awards.

== Plot ==
Moina is the youngest son in a middle-class family. He is unemployed and performs poorly in his studies. He is popular among his neighbors because of his willingness to help others and his interest in cricket.

Moina's sister's marriage is fixed. The father asks his employed sons for financial help, but they refuse. So he decides to sell his house to collect money for his daughter's marriage.

In the newspaper, Moina reads that both the kidneys of a rich man's daughter have been damaged and the girl needs a kidney immediately. The rich man will pay a lot of money in return. Moina learns that if someone donates a kidney they can lead a normal life, but cannot do any hard work.

Now there are two paths open in front of Moina, either he will be one of the best players, or he will help the girl by giving a kidney. Finally, Moina gives up his dream of becoming a famous cricketer to collect money for his sister's wedding and to save his ancestral home from being sold.

== Cast ==
- Pranjal Saikia as Son Moina
- Manjula Baruah as sister in law
- Suren Mahanta as father
- Purabi Sarma as sister of Son Moina
- Jaba Bhuyan as lover of Son Moina
- Samudragupta Dutta as nephew of Son Moina
- Anjali Bhuyan
- Apurbaa Dutta
- Marami Baishya
- Siva Prasad Thakur
- Mirel Kuddus
- Rana Tamuli

== Award ==
- Best Feature Film in Assamese (1984)
