= Muthayya =

Indian Telugu-language film

- Directed by: Bhaskhar Maurya
- Written by: Bhaskhar Maurya
- Produced by: Vamsi Karumanchi; Vrinda Prasad
- Starring: Sudhakar Reddy Arun Raj
- Cinematography: Divakar Mani
- Edited by: Sai Murali
- Music by: Karthik Rodriguez
- Production company: Hylife Entertainments Fictionary Entertainment
- Release dates: 9 May 2022 (UK Asian Film Festival); 1 May 2025
- Country: India
- Language: Telugu

Muthayya is a 2022 Indian Telugu-language comedy drama film, written and directed by Bhaskhar Maurya, and produced by Vamsi Karumanchi and Vrinda Prasad under Hylife Entertainments and Fictionary Entertainment. The film starred Sudhakar Reddy and Arun Raj as lead characters.

== Plot ==
The film follows the journey of Muthayya, a 70-year-old man living in a remote village in Telangana, who dreams of acting in movies before he dies. But his ill-health and fate turn out to be the biggest obstacles in his journey. The film is all about dreams and an ode to those who beat all odds to achieve their dreams, no matter how old they are.

== Cast ==
- Sudhakar Reddy as Muthayya
- Arun Raj as Malli
- Purna Chander M as Narasimha (Muthayya's son)
- Mounika Bomma as Shailu
- Sai Leela as Narasimha's wife
- Kiran Kumar as Maddileti (Shailu's father)
- Jayavardhan Sagar as Narasimha's son

== Production ==
The film was shot in several villages near Wanaparthy in Telangana state.

=== Music ===
Karthik Rodriguez composed the music and he also sang a song 'Sandurude'. There are three songs in the film and two of the songs - 'Aravaila Padusodu' and 'Sandurude' - have been penned by Shiva Krishna Erroju, and Bhaskhar Maurya penned the lyrics for 'Cinema La Act Jeshi'. Vidyasagar Bankupalli sang the song 'Aravaila Padusodu', and Chinna K sang 'Cinema La Act Jeshi'.

=== Film Festivals & Awards ===
The film had its world premiere at UK Asian Film Festival and it was screened in London on 9 May 2022. It was later screened at 28th Kolkata International Film Festival, South Asian Film Festival of Montreal (Canada), META Film Fest (Dubai), Habitat Film Festival (New Delhi), India Film Festival of Alberta (Canada), Third ACTion Film Festival's October screening (Canada), Indic Film Utsav, Cinemaking International Film Festival (Bangladesh), and Ischia Global Fest (Italy). The film has won numerous awards including Best Feature Film in National Competition On Indian Languages category at 28th Kolkata International Film Festival, Best Feature Film Jury award at Indic Film Utsav, and Best Debut Director at META Film Festival, Dubai.

=== Release ===
The film had a direct digital release on ETV Win streaming platform on 1 May 2025.

== Reception ==
The film received positive reviews with critics praising Sudhakar Reddy and Arun Raj's performances, Divakar Mani's cinematography.

Sangeetha Devi of The Hindu praised the performances in the film and called it a 'charming film about long cherished dreams'. Sruthi Ganapathy Raman of The Hollywood Reporter India called Muthayya a solid drama and said the film is a wholesome look at the often lonely but deeply fulfilling lives of dreamers.

Aditya Devulapally of New Indian Express praised the film saying, "This beautiful rural drama explores the weight of ambitions with grace, restraint and unforgettable realism."
