= RK Meghen =

Chairman of UNLF

Former Chairman (Matam Amagi Luchingpurel) RK Meghen
- Sana Yaima
- Born: 21 September 1944 (age 81); Yaiskul
- Education: Master
- Occupation: Former Chairman of UNLF
- Organization: UNLF
- Spouse: Ibemnungshi
- Parents: RK Madhuyarajit (father); Laitonjam Hemabati (mother)
- Family: RK Chingkhei(son); Leisangthem Debidita Devi (Daughter-in-law); RK Chinglen (son); Thounaojam Brinda (Daughter in law)

Rajkumar Meghen (born 21 September 1944) alias Sana Yaima (precious son) is a Manipuri separatist revolutionarist and former chairman of United National Liberation Front.

== Personal life ==
Meghen is the second son of RK Madhuyarajit Singh and Laitonjam Ningol Hemabati, and the great grandson of Prince Tikhendrajit (however there is no significant evidence to prove this claim as Prince Tikendrajit died as a bachelor), the military commander for Manipur Kingdom in the Anglo Manipuri War. He graduated from St. Paul's Cathedral Mission College in Kolkata and went for his Master's degree from Jadavpur University in International Relations.

== UNLF ==
RK Meghen reportedly joined UNLF in 1976. In 1975, he left Manipur and trekked to a militant camp in Myanmar’s Somra Tract led by Thuingaleng Muivah and S. S. Khaplang; his younger son was six days old. He became chairman of UNLF in 1998.

In 2010, he was arrested at Bangladesh and soon, handed over to India. The National Investigation Agency (NIA) charged him along with 18 other leaders for waging a war on India and raising funds by extorting the state government and private bodies. In June 2016, the NIA Court pronounced a guilty verdict on 11 sections of the Indian Penal Code and Unlawful Activities (Prevention) Act; Meghen was sentenced to 10 years in prison. He declined to appeal for leniency and rejected that Indian Courts had any sovereign rights to litigate him.

In November 2019, his sentence was commuted by about 10 months owing to his contributions to the jail such as, setting up a library, a music school for prisoners and construction of a garden inside the Guwahati Central Jail. He was released from jail, in what was widely perceived to be a governmental strategy during the Naga Peace talks. However, he was disallowed by the National Investigation Agency to immediately return to Manipur and instead transported to a safe house in Guwahati followed by Delhi. On 28 November, he was finally allowed to leave for Imphal. Meghen has since spent a quite life, away from media attention.
