= Nakenthana Ngairi =

- Poster
- Directed by: Dinesh Tongbram
- Written by: Dinesh Tongbram
- Produced by: Dinesh Tongbram
- Starring: Amarjeet Rajkumar; Huirem Seema; Kaiku Rajkumar; Devita Urikhinbam
- Cinematography: Dilip (celluloid); Imo Yumnam (digital)
- Edited by: Kh. Nilachandra (Boy); AGC, Lamphel
- Music by: Jiten Khaidem; Background score: Jeetenkumar Naorem; Audiography: Sunachand
- Production company: United Films Manipur
- Distributed by: United Films Manipur
- Release date: 10 September 2006
- Running time: 164 minutes
- Country: India
- Language: Meiteilon (Manipuri)

Nakenthana Ngairi ('Autumn is Waiting') is a 2006 Manipuri film written, produced and directed by Dinesh Tongbram. It is the first production of United Films Manipur. The film features Amarjeet Rajkumar, Huirem Seema, Kaiku Rajkumar and Devita Urikhinbam in the lead roles. It was released at Usha Cinema, Paona Bazar on 10 September 2006.

Nakenthana Ngairi was initially named as Wahangsina. The processing of the film had been done at Rupayan (Kolkata), Ramoji Film City (Hyderabad) and AGC (Lamphel). This was the first Manipuri video film converted from celluloid in the state.

== Plot ==
Aya's and Bem's romance is disrupted by Bem's mother on the ground that Aya is from a poor family background. Despite Bem's father repeated suggestions to not interfere in their relationship, his wife continues to follow her own line of thoughts. Carving out elaborate plans, Bem's mother gets her daughter married to a rich guy Sobhas. The guy happens to be an immoral person who maintains illicit affairs with his long time girlfriend Indira even after the marriage. Pushpa (Bem's younger sister) tries to win Sanjoy's (Aya's younger brother) heart as a revenge against her mother who forcefully marries Bem without her consent. Pushpa succeeds.

Due to repeated physical and mental harassment by Sobhas, Bem becomes ill and gets hospitalised. During her stay in the hospital, her son Momocha dies. Bem becomes a intellectually disabled woman. She comes back to her maternal home. There, Aya comes to take her. True love triumphs at the end.

== Cast ==
- Amarjeet Rajkumar as Aya
- Huirem Seema as Bem
- Kaiku Rajkumar as Sanjoy, Aya's younger brother
- Devita Urikhinbam as Pushpa, Bem's younger sister
- Wangkhem Lalitkumar as IAS officer, Bem's father
- R.K. Hemabati as Bem's mother
- Khwairakpam Bishwamittra as Sobhas
- Laimayum Gayatri as Indira, Sobhas' girlfriend
- Laishram Lalitabi as Sanjoy's mother
- Gurumayum Ongbi Gunabati as Aya's mother
- Joseph Thokchom as Munal, Aya's college mate
- Laimayum Bolex as Momocha, Bem's son

== Soundtrack ==
The tune and music were composed by Jiten Khaidem, Tomba Thangjam and Gopi. Manichandra, Bobi, Kemo and Yu Gandhi wrote the lyrics. Sunita Nepram, Huidrom Nowboy, Maibam Roshibina, Khun Joykumar and Pushparani Huidrom are the playback singers in the movie.

No.	Title	Music	Singer(s)	Length
1.	"Eigi Pukningse Leitapham Khangdare"	Jiten Khaidem	Sunita Nepram	03:38
2.	"Nungshi Mapao Takhidare"	Jiten Khaidem	Sunita Nepram	02:14
3.	"Soiraba"	Tomba Thangjam	Maibam Roshibina	04:55
4.	"Nanggi Nungshibana"	Gopi	Huidrom Nowboy, Pushparani Huidrom	03:45
5.	"Khetnaba Thamoi Ani"	Jiten Khaidem	Khun Joykumar	01:00
Total length:				15:32
