= Huirem Seema =

Indian actress from Manipur

- Seema in Yumleima Lamleima (2009)
- Born: Huirem Seema; 8 November 1970; Yaiskul Hiruhanba Leikai, Imphal, Manipur
- Died: 17 September 2011 (aged 40); Nagamapal Phougeisangbam Leikai, Imphal
- Occupations: Actress, Producer, Director
- Spouse: Laimayum Surjakanta
- Children: Suraj Sharma; Bolex Laimayum
- Parent(s): Huirem Motilal Singh; Huirem Ongbi Ibeni Devi

Huirem Ningol Laimayum Ongbi Seema (8 November 1970 – 17 September 2011) was an Indian actress from Imphal, Manipur. She had appeared in more than 100 Manipuri films. As a producer, she had four Manipuri digital films to her credit. She was best known for her roles in movies like Kanaga Hinghouni, Chang Shi Chang, Lakhipurgi Lakhipyari, Naoshum, Yumleima Lamleima and Thasi Thanou. Two films where she acted, namely Yenning Amadi Likla (feature) and Ngaihak Lambida (non-feature) made entries into the Indian Panorama of the International Film Festival of India.

Many of her films like Tolenkhomba (Lakhpati), Amamba Sayon, Naoba Naobi and Langon were released posthumously.

== Career ==
Seema started her film career at the age of five. Her father was a renowned theatre artiste. She also acted in a few plays of leading theatre group Rupmahal Theatre and teleplays for Doordarshan before she shaped her career in movies. Her appearance in movies started since the times of celluloid era of Manipuri cinema. She acted in 15 celluloid films and around 100 digital films. Her debut movie was 31st December, a video film directed by L. Surjakanta. Her notable celluloid films include Nongju Ahing, Aroiba Bidaai and Kanaga Hinghouni. Her appearance in video format films were marked by movies like Mantri Dolansana and One Way. In digital films where she acted, Seema played supporting roles in general. But her acting prowess and versatility could be seen vividly in digital films where she took leading roles. Yumleima Lamleima, Sanahanbi and Thasi Thanou were such films of her.

Besides acting, she had produced four films under the banner of Seema Productions (SF). The movies were Asha, Kalpana, Thamoinungda and Yumleima Lamleima. She co-directed Yumleima Lamleima with Homen D' Wai. She was an approved artiste of All India Radio, Imphal.

== Selected filmography ==
| Year | Film | Role | Director |
|---|---|---|---|
| 1993 | Mantri Dolansana | Samuma | Dinesh Tongbram |
| 1996 | Kanaga Hinghouni | Mamta | Chan Heisnam & Khwairakpam Bishwamittra |
| 1999 | Aroiba Bidaai | Ibeyaima | Oken Amakcham |
| 2002 | Nongju Ahing | | L. Surjakanta |
| 2002 | Thawanmichakna Kenkhrabada | Meera | Ksh. Kishorekumar |
| 2003 | Kalpana | Kalpana | Ksh. Kishorekumar |
| 2004 | Chang Shi Chang | Memi | Eepu |
| 2004 | Asha | Shila | Ishomani |
| 2005 | Thamoinungda | Rani | Ishomani |
| 2005 | Amuktang Chamthoknashi | Achouba's mother | Diya Khwairakpam |
| 2006 | Nakenthana Ngairi | Bem | Dinesh Tongbram |
| 2006 | Payal | Rani | Amar Raj |
| 2006 | Best Friend (Eta Chanabi) | Langlen's sister | O. Sanou |
| 2006 | Ngaihak Lambida | Manileima | Haobam Paban Kumar |
| 2006 | Ngamloi Eidee Kainaba | Rishi's sister | Amar Raj |
| 2006 | Lakhipurgi Lakhipyari | Thambal | L. Surjakanta |
| 2006 | Eedom Chatcharage | Punshiba's sister-in-law | Amar Raj |
| 2007 | Naoshum | Leibaklei | Oinam Gautam Singh |
| 2007 | Yenning Amadi Likla | Leibaklei | Makhonmani Mongsaba |
| 2007 | Akhunba Mani | Thasana | Romi Meitei |
| 2008 | Nungshibi Ahing | Matouleibi | Homen D' Wai |
| 2008 | Tayai | Tharo | K. Bimol Sharma |
| 2009 | Yumleima Lamleima | Sanahanbi | Seema & Homen D' Wai |
| 2009 | Kaboklei | Kaboklei's mother | Pilu H. |
| 2009 | Paachaa | Panthoi's sister | Khwairakpam Bishwamittra |
| 2009 | Dharmagi Mingda Imagidamak | Ganga | Romi Meitei |
| 2010 | Thasi Thanou | Thagoi | Eepu |
| 2010 | Hayengna Kanana Pangani | Hemba's mother | L. Surjakanta |
| 2010 | Tillaikhombee | Likla | Khwairakpam Bishwamittra |
| 2010 | Chanu | Leima | Bimol Phibou |
| 2010 | Manglando | Tampha | Ranjitkumar |
| 2010 | Lambidudei | Sakhen's mother | K. Bimol Sharma |
| 2010 | Mamado Leisabido Angaobido | Lalita | Romi Meitei |
| 2011 | Meehatpa | Leisemba's wife | Ksh. Kishorekumar |
| 2011 | Loibataare Ta Raju | Soochi's mother | Pilu H. |
| 2011 | Punshi Chuppa Nangshe Eigini | Thaja's mother | Premanda |
| 2011 | Ishwar Masu Angaobani | Leichil's sister-in-law | L. Prakash |
| 2012 | Tolenkhomba (Lakhpati) | Leimahan | L. Rajesh |
| 2012 | Lanphamda Ibeni | Judge's wife | Romi Meitei |
| 2012 | Mangalsigee Ashada | Naoba's mother | Suvas E. |
| 2013 | Amamba Sayon | Priestess | Johnson Mayanglangbam |
| 2013 | 80,000 Meiraba Romio | Thasana | Premanda |
| 2019 | Langon | Khamnu | L. Surjakanta |

== Accolades ==
Seema was honoured with different titles at several film awards and festivals.

| Award | Category | Film | Ref. |
|---|---|---|---|
| 3rd Manipur State Film Awards 1999 | Best Actress in a Lead Role | Kanaga Hinghouni | |
| 4th Manipur State Film Awards | Best Female Supporting Actress | Aroiba Bidaai | |
| 6th Manipur State Film Festival | Best Actress in a Lead Role | Nongju Ahing | |
| First Festival of Manipuri Cinema 2007 | Best Supporting Role - Female | Lakhipurgi Lakhipyari | |
| 7th Manipur State Film Festival 2010 | Best Supporting Actress | Naoshum | |
| 1st Sahitya Seva Samiti MANIFA 2012 | Best Actress in a Leading Role | Thasi Thanou | |
