= Manda Leima =

Indian actress from Manipur

- Born: Manda Saikhom; Heirangoithong, Imphal, Manipur; Present address: Kwakeithel, Imphal, Manipur
- Occupation: Actress
- Children: 2
- Father: Saikhom Babudhon Meitei

Manda Leima is an actress who appears in Manipuri films. Angangba Kurao Mapal, Lallasi Pal, Kaboklei, Inga Nonglakta, Nangna Mama Oibiyu and Lanphamda Ibeni are some of her notable films.

She served as Jury at 16th Manipur State Film Awards. Manda Leima was the face of Shingju Festival 2020.

== Career ==
Lallasi Pal, Nongallabasu Thaballei Manam and Lanphamda Ibeni, Kaboklei are some of her works.

In 2020, she appeared in the non-feature Nawa Seidum directed by Lawrence Chandam. The film got selection in the Micro Film Finalist at the Indie Short Fest, Los Angeles, 2020. It also bagged the Outstanding Achievement Award at the Tagore International Film Festival 2020 and Best Narrative Film in Moment International 2020.

== Accolades ==
Manda Leima was conferred the 1st Late P. Kenedy Memorial Filmfare Award 2004 by the Educated Unemployed Self-Service Association, Moirang.

Award	Category	Film	Ref.
North East TV People's Choice Awards 2004, Guwahati	Best Actress	Angangba Kurao Mapal	
7th Manipur State Film Festival 2010	Best Actress in a Leading Role - Female	Kaboklei	

== Selected filmography ==
Year	Film	Role	Director
2002	Lallasi Pal	Leihao	Eepu
2002	Ingengi Atiya (The Sky of Autumn)	Seema	Bishwamittra
2003	Kalpana	Karuna	Ksh. Kishorekumar
2004	Nungshi Hekta Hairage	Mala	Ksh. Kishorekumar
2004	Lallibadi Eini	Seema	Khwairakpam Bishwamittra
2004	Angangba Kurao Mapal	Thoi	Romi Meitei
2005	Laang	Mema	Moirangthem Inao
2005	Nongallabasu Thaballei Manam	Dr. Urirei	Moirangthem Inao
2005	Mathang Mapokta	Geetu	Diya Khwairakpam
2005	Laibakki Chandan	Priya	O. Gautam
2005	Nanga Thengnaramdraba	Anuradha	Ak. Gyaneshori
2005	Thengmankhre Thabalse	Thoibi	Romi Meitei
2005	Sageigee Mouni	Thaballei	Diya Khwairakpam
2005	Nangna Mama Oibiyu	Bembem	Romi Meitei
2005	Ayukki Likla	Dr. Thaja	Romi Meitei
2006	Ta-Tomba The Great	Thadoi	Ksh. Kishorekumar
2006	Inga Nonglakta	Thoibi	Romi Meitei
2009	Kaboklei	Kaboklei	Pilu H.
2012	Lanphamda Ibeni	Ibeni	Romi Meitei
2018	Soinairaba Thamoi	Sanatombi	Pilu H.
2018	Ei Lakkhini	Langlen	Hemjeet Moirangthem
