= Lairenjam Olen =

Indian actor from Manipur

- Born: Lairenjam Olendro; 1973 (age 52–53); Laipham Khunou Mamang Leikai Post Lamlong, Imphal, Manipur
- Occupations: Actor, Politician
- Spouse: Ningthoukhongjam Harimati
- Parent(s): Lairenjam Shyamkesho; Lairenjam Ongbi Ebemhal
- Awards: Best Male Actor (2005–2007), Best Actor (2007)

Lairenjam Olen is an Indian actor who predominantly appears in Manipuri films. He started as a Theatre Artist and was a member of Orient Drama Union, Imphal. His famous films include Dr. Yaima, Mittrang Keithel, Khongchat series, Radha-Rani, Lallasi Pal and Mr. Lakhipyari. He played double roles of Nganthoi and Thonba in the 2004 movie Icham Chamna. In 2017, he won the 5th Zilla Parishad Panchayat election as a candidate of the Heingang Constituency.

== Accolades ==
Lairenjam Olen was honoured with different titles at several film awards and festivals.

Award	Category	Film	Ref.
North East TV People's Choice Awards 2004, Guwahati	Best Actor in Manipuri Film	Nungsi Hekta Hairage	
RJ Vision Special Film Award 2005-2007	Best Male Actor	Nungsi Hekta Hairage	
First Festival of Manipur Cinema 2007	Best Actor - Male	Lallasi Pal	
8th Manipur State Film Festival 2013	Best Actor in a Supporting Role - Male	Thasi Thanou	

== Selected filmography ==
Year	Film	Role	Director
1996	Khongchat	Tomba	O. Sanou
2002	Lallasi Pal	Tompok	Mayanglangbam Raghumani (Eepu)
2003	Leichildagee Urok	Ibohal	O. Gautam
2004	Icham Chamna	Nganthoi & Thonba	Eepu
2004	Nungshi Hekta Hairage	Phairen	Ksh. Kishorekumar
2004	Dr. Yaima	Yaima	Homen D' Wai
2004	Chang Shi Chang	Imo	Eepu
2005	Mr. Lakhipyari	Lakhi	Homen D' Wai
2006	Khongul	Hemba	O. Jiten
2006	Radha-Rani	Jiten	O. Gautam
2006	Paokhum Ama	Police	Tayenjam Mema & Ibomcha
2006	Tellangga Mamei	Bimol	Oken Amakcham
2006	Best Friend (Eta Chanabi)	Thanil	O. Sanou
2006	Mittrang Keithel	Munan	Homen D' Wai
2006	Lakhipurgi Lakhipyari	Amar	L. Surjakanta
2007	Thoiba Thoibi	Thoiba	Romi Meitei
2007	Amuktang Punna Nokshi	Phairen	Ksh. Kishorekumar
2007	Lammuknaraba Punshi	Chaoba	Ch. Inaobi
2007	Yenning Amadi Likla	Ibohal	Makhonmani Mongsaba
2008	Nongallakpa	Lala	Bhabeshwar Mayengbam
2008	Tayai	Ibochouba	K. Bimol Sharma
2008	Keishamthong Thoibi	Eigya Pameshor	O. Gautam
2008	Kekoo Lotpee	Lanjenba	Homen D' Wai
2008	Handakta Nouna Khangnaba	Nungsi	P. Praphullo
2009	Ahingee Tandan	Nongdamba	K. Bimol Sharma
2009	Leeklam	Thawaijao	Homen D' Wai
2009	Paokhum	Anand	Khwairakpam Bishwamittra
2009	Eigee Morambee	Chamba	Rajen Leishangthem
2009	Atiyagee Meenok	Phairen	Ksh. Kishorekumar
2009	Lonthoktabagee Wari	Sanathoi	Diya Khwairakpam
2009	Yumleima Lamleima	Buddhi	Seema & Homen D' Wai
2009	Eegi Machu	Imotomba	Keiphah
2009	Mageedamakni	Nongyai	Oken Amakcham
2010	Nangdi Eigi Thawaini	Pakchao	O. Gautam
2010	21st Century's Kunti	Rajlakshmi's brother	Joy Soram
2010	Eishe Kanano...!?	Sanahal	Rajen Leishangthem
2010	Tillaikhombee	Lemba	Khwairakpam Bishwamittra
2010	Thasi Thanou	Ibomcha	Eepu
2010	Govindagee Sharik Makhol	Amuba	Homen D' Wai
2011	Miraang	Kulabidhu	Aribam Syam Sharma
2012	Boiton Mangkhre	Thoujal	Khoibam Homeshwori
2012	Leipaklei	Ibotomba	Aribam Syam Sharma
2012	Highway 39: Punshi Lambida	Shamu	Homen D' Wai
2014	Sanarik	Doren	L. Rajesh
2016	Yaibikol	Ningthou	R.K. Homen
2016	Ingagee Thanil	Tomba	Mohindro (KAMS)
2017	Ningol Chakkouba	Tomba	Sanaton Nongthomba
2018	Naitom	Thoi's father	Dinesh Phundongbam
2019	Nongphadok Lakpa Atithi	Ibohal	Aribam Syam Sharma
