= Leipaklei =

- Poster
- Directed by: Aribam Syam Sharma
- Screenplay by: Arambam Ongbi Memchoubi
- Story by: Arambam Samarendra
- Produced by: Aribam Syam Sharma
- Starring: Leishangthem Tonthoi; Lairenjam Olen
- Cinematography: Irom Maipak
- Edited by: Oinam Gautam Singh
- Music by: Aribam Uttam Sharma; Ibopishak
- Production company: Aribam Syam Sharma Productions
- Distributed by: Doordarshan Kendra Imphal
- Release date: December 2012 (Guwahati)
- Running time: 75 minutes
- Country: India
- Language: Meiteilon (Manipuri)

Leipaklei (transl. Indian crocus flower) is a 2012 Manipuri film directed and produced by Aribam Syam Sharma. It stars Leishangthem Tonthoi in the title role. The story of the film was written by Arambam Samarendra and screenplay by Arambam Ongbi Memchoubi. Leipaklei was screened on the inaugural day of 5th Guwahati Film Festival 2012. It was also screened at the 18th Kolkata International Film Festival and 14th Jeonju International Film Festival (JIFF) held at Jeonju, South Korea. The film won the National Film Award for Best Feature Film in Manipuri at the 60th National Film Awards.

== Synopsis ==
The film Leipaklei tells the story of Leipaklei, a woman named after a Manipuri flower. Like the flower whose habitat is the hard ground, she is surrounded by hard trials and ironies of fate: separation from the one who loved and is still loved by her, abandonment by her husband, the trials of being a single parent, the violence of the gaze of men who sees her as fair game. Not unlike the flower Leipaklei, which hibernates beneath parched grounds – dreaming for a spring past, the protagonist dreams of the return of her beloved. He returns.

== Cast ==
- Leishangthem Tonthoi as Leipaklei
- Lairenjam Olen as Ibotomba
- Gurumayum Kalpana as Tamurei
- Thingom Pritam as Thoiba
- Gurumayum Priyogopal as Khura
- Sundari as Mandon
- Baby Rainy as Meme

== Accolades ==
Leipaklei won the National Film Award for Best Feature Film in Manipuri at the 60th National Film Awards. The citation for the National Award reads, "A simple story told in a straight-forward simple narrative highlighting social reality".
