= Leishangthem Tonthoingambi Devi =

Indian film actress

Tonthoi
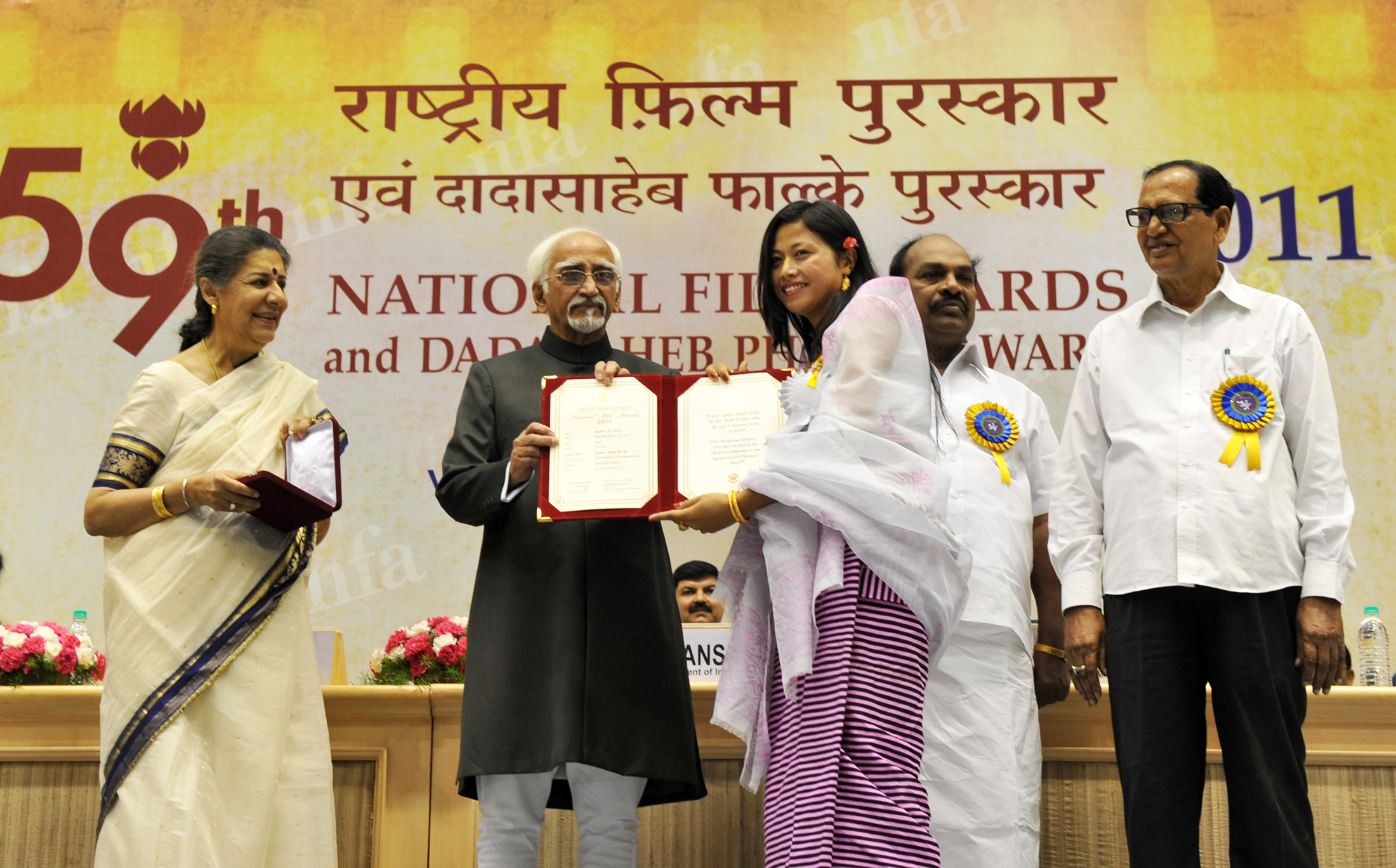
- Tonthoi receiving the Best Supporting Actress Award at the 59th National Film Awards function
- Born: 17 October; Chingkhu, Khundrakpam, Manipur
- Occupation: Actress
- Spouse: Thokchom Deepak
- Parent(s): Leishangthem Ibungomacha Singh; Leishangthem Ongbi Leibaklei Devi
- Awards: National Film Award for Best Supporting Actress (2011)

Tonthoingambi Leishangthem, popularly known as Tonthoi, is an Indian actress. She has established a career in Manipuri films and is the recipient of several awards, including a National Film Award.

== Early life and education ==
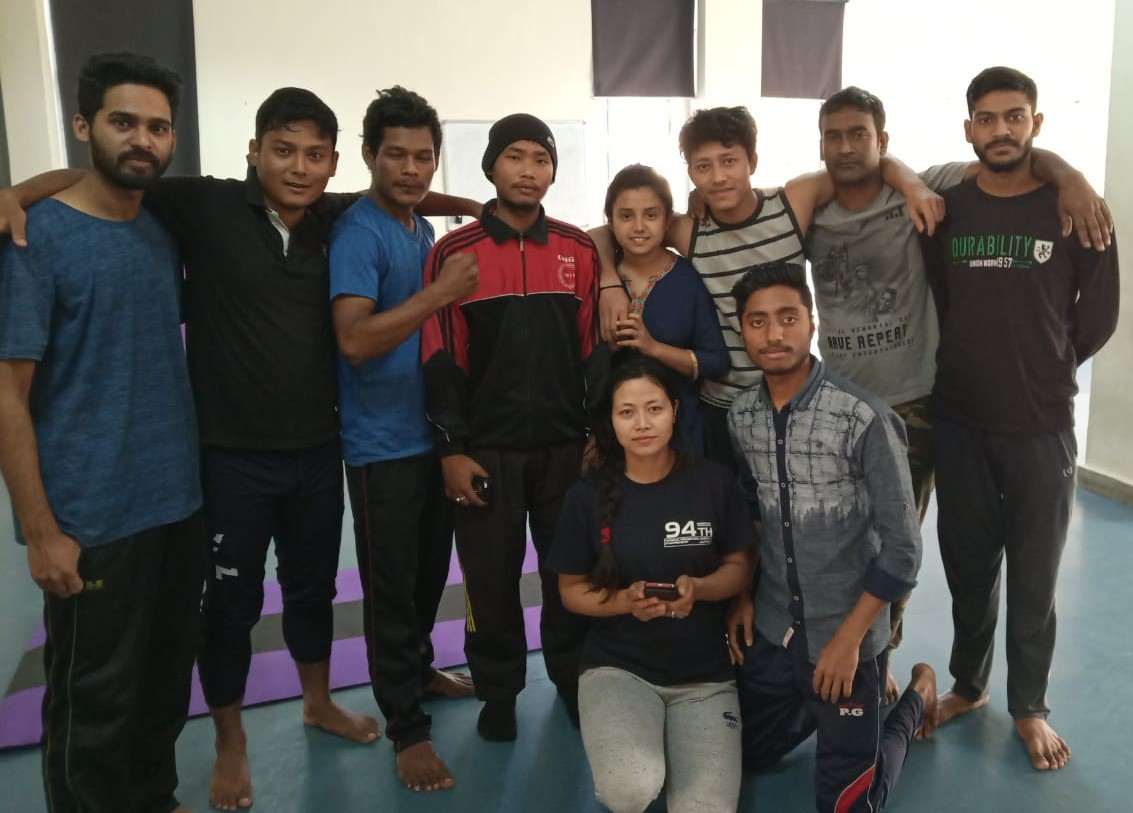
Tonthoi and other NSD pupils with Aloy Deb Barma at NSD, Tripura

She is a B.Com. graduate and has taken keen interest in performing arts since very young age. Tonthoi loves sports and has actively been volunteering in social service since her childhood. She completed her master's in social work from Manipur University. As a student, she was part of the University's women football team which participated in All India Women Football tournament. She has also been trained in playing the traditional music instrument, Pena. Before joining NSD, she took a three-month acting class in the early month of 2007 under Oja Niladhaja Khuman. She has also completed her one-year residential certificate course in Theatre in Education from National School of Drama, Tripura.

== Career ==
Leishangthem appeared in feature films, Doordarshan serials and ISTV serials.

Her first film is Nangna Thawaini, where she was playing heroine's friend, alongside Kamala and Gung in a supporting role. After this, she has done a number of Manipuri films. Among the notable ones are Loibataare Ta Raju, Thoicha, Amamba Sayon (Resurrection), Eepaktuda the lake, Leipaklei, Nungshibee Kabaw Valley, Beragee Bomb, Pallepfam and Phijigee Mani.

She has also produced a Manipuri film titled Beragee Bomb under the banner of Chingkhurakpa Arts along with her brother. Her Manipuri film Pallepfam and her Assamese film Borxharanya got entries at the 10th edition of Habitat Film Festival. She also acted in an Assamese film Ishu which went on to won the National Award for Best Feature Film in Assamese 2017.

Her 2019 film Eigi Kona won the National Film Award for Best Feature Film in Manipuri at the 67th National Film Awards. She played a supporting role in the film.

Her performance as Leima in the 2024 film Langdai Ama was recognized by Screen Echoes Manipur as one of the Best Eight Performances in Manipuri Cinema of the Last Decade. The Signpost News praised Tonthoi’s performance in the film as “quietly commanding”, noting her ability to convey pain, pride, and vulnerability with authenticity and emotional depth, calling it the heart of the film.

== Accolades ==
She has won a number of awards, including a National Film Award. She received the Best Supporting Actress award at the 59th National Film Awards 2011 for the film Phijigee Mani, where she played the role of Yaiphabee in the film. The citation for the award reads, "For the dignity and power with which L. T. Devi informs the character Yaipabhee in this tightly controlled Manipuri story."

| Award | Category | Film | Ref. |
|---|---|---|---|
| 7th Manipur State Film Festival 2010 | Special Jury Mention | Paokhum | |
| 59th National Film Awards 2011 | Best Supporting Actress | Phijigee Mani | |
| 8th Manipur State Film Festival 2013 | Best Actor in a Supporting Role - Female | Thasi Thanou | |
| 9th Manipur State Film Awards 2014 | Best Actor in a Leading Role - Female | Nangna Kappa Pakchade | |
| Prag Cine Awards North-East 2016 | Best Actor North-East Female | Patkee Tharo | |
| Prag Cine Awards North-East 2018 | Best Actress | Iche Tampha | |
| 11th Manipuri State Film Awards 2018 | Special Jury Award | Iche Tampha | |
| Chalachitram National Film Festival 2021 | Grand Jury Award for Best Actor | Panthougi Liklam | |
| Global Independent Film Festival of India 2022 | Best Actor - Female | Eewai | |
| Goa International Film Competition 2022 | Best Actor - Female | Eewai | |
| 3rd Jammu Film Festival 2023 | Best Actor - Female | Eewai | |
| Niri9 2nd International Film Festival 2023 | Best Actor - Female | Eewai | |

== Off-screen work ==
Tonthoi was the brand ambassador of Singju Festival, which is held every year between January and February, starting from the year 2017. Singju is a typical Meitei salad-type dish. The festival is held at different places, including MMRC and Unity Park, Khangabok and Lamdeng Makha Leikai Lampak.

== Selected filmography ==
- Feature Films

| Year | Film | Role | Director |
|---|---|---|---|
| 2007 | Nangna Thawaini | Thaja | Chan Heisnam |
| 2009 | Shak Henba Bhoot | Nur Jahan | Bishwamittra |
| 2009 | Paachaa | Panthoi | Bishwamittra |
| 2009 | Paokhum | Kimboi | Bishwamittra |
| 2010 | Thoicha | Thoicha | Ningthoujam Prem |
| 2010 | Thasi Thanou | Memthoi | Eepu |
| 2011 | Phijigee Mani | Yaiphabee | O. Gautam |
| 2011 | Nungshibee Kabaw Valley | Suche | Jeetendra Ningomba |
| 2011 | Mongpham | Linthoi | Lai Jiten |
| 2011 | Eepaktuda The Lake | Thoi | Johnson Mayanglambam |
| 2011 | Miraang | Bimola | Aribam Syam Sharma |
| 2011 | Loibataare Ta Raju | Thoi | Pilu H. |
| 2012 | Leipaklei | Leipaklei | Aribam Syam Sharma |
| 2012 | Phongdoknadringei | Ayeengbi | OC Meira |
| 2013 | Beragee Bomb | Thoibi | O. Gautam |
| 2013 | Nangna Kappa Pakchade | Nungshitombi | Makhonmani Mongsaba |
| 2013 | Amamba Sayon | Memi | Johnson Mayanglambam |
| 2013 | Sanadi Sanani | Langlen | Khoibam Homeshwori |
| 2013 | Ani x Ani = Mari | Thoi | Jeetendra Ningomba |
| 2014 | Pallepfam | Lembi | Wanglen Khundongbam |
| 2014 | Ayekpa Lai | Thaja | Oken Amakcham |
| 2014 | Eidee Kadaida | Rohini | O. Gautam |
| 2014 | VDF Thasana | Laishna | Homen D' Wai |
| 2015 | Patkee Tharo | | Oken Amakcham |
| 2015 | Borxharanya (The Rainforest) | | Diganta Mazumdar |
| 2015 | Keishal Jaildugi Fadoksing | Loya's friend | Satyajit BK |
| 2016 | Octabee Natte | Leibaklei | Paari Luwang |
| 2016 | Eikhoi Pabunggi | Sanatombi | Hemanta Khuman |
| 2016 | Tharo Thambal | Thambal | Bijgupta Laishram |
| 2017 | Iche Tampha | Tampha | Bijgupta Laishram |
| 2017 | Thoicha 3 | Thoicha | Jeetendra Ningomba |
| 2017 | Ishu | Ambika | Utpal Borpujari |
| 2018 | Tomthin | Sanarei | Ojitbabu Ningthoujam |
| 2018 | Chingda Satpi Engellei | Pering | Bobby Haobam |
| 2018 | Won Nam | Leihao | Maipaksana Haorongbam |
| 2019 | Eigi Kona | Nganthoi | Bobby Wahengbam & Maipaksana Haorongbam |
| 2021 | Rongdaife | Leinu | Bobby Haobam |
| 2024 | Langdai Ama | Leima | Binoranjan Oinam |

- Non-Feature Films

| Year | Film | Role | Director |
|---|---|---|---|
| 2012 | Mei Ikpa | Thambalsang | Chaoba Thiyam |
| 2015 | Tanggoi | | Babina Salam |
| 2017 | Tinthrok | Yaima's wife | Oken Amakcham |
| 2021 | Panthougi Liklam | Thoibi | Rakesh Moirangthem |
| 2022 | Eewai | Henba's mother | Khwairakpam Bishwamittra |
| 2025 | Toy Gun | Leima | Parshuram Thingnam |
