= UNLF =

UNLF may refer to:

- United National Liberation Front, an insurgent group in the state of Manipur in the north-east of India
- Uganda National Liberation Front, a coalition of anti-Idi Amin groups consisting of Ugandan exiles, formed in Tanzania in the 1970s
- UEFA Nations League Finals, the final tournament of the UEFA Nations League
