= Eigi Kona =

2019 Manipuri film by Bobby Wahengbam

- Poster
- Directed by: Bobby Wahengbam; Maipaksana Haorongbam
- Screenplay by: Maipaksana Haorongbam
- Story by: Maipaksana Haorongbam
- Produced by: Dr. K. Sushila Leima
- Starring: Sinam Shaolin; Oinam Prafullochandra; Ayekpam Shanti; Leishangthem Tonthoi; Romesh Elangbam
- Cinematography: Irom Maipak
- Edited by: Rajkumar Lalmani
- Music by: R.K. Birendrajit
- Production company: Luwang Apokpa Mamikol
- Distributed by: Luwang Apokpa Mamikol
- Release date: 2019
- Running time: 90 minutes
- Country: India
- Language: Meiteilon (Manipuri)

Eigi Kona (English: Stallone, My Pony) is a 2019 Manipuri film directed by Bobby Wahengbam and Maipaksana Haorongbam and produced by Dr. K. Sushila Leima, under the banner of Luwang Apokpa Mamikol Productions. The film was premiered at Manipur State Film Development Society (MSFDS), Palace Compound in December 2021. Eigi Kona was selected for Indian Panorama of the 51st International Film Festival of India (IFFI) 2020. The movie won the National Film Award for Best Feature Film in Manipuri at the 67th National Film Awards.

Eigi Kona got official selections at the Indica Film Utsav 2020, 4th Ottawa Indian Film Festival Awards (OIFFA) 2021 and Thrissur International Film Festival 2021.

The film was also screened at the 52nd International Film Festival of India 2021 under the section India@75. It was organized as a part of the celebrations to commemorate 75 years of India's independence, Azadi Ka Amrit Mahotsav and 18 films were selected under the section.

== Plot ==
Thawai, a young boy, loves to play polo riding Stallone, a Manipuri pony. Stallone is descendant of the horse his famous polo pony his grandfather rode, but the family have fallen on hard times. When Thawai's father is forced to sell Stallone to alleviate their poverty, Thawai becomes sick with pangs of separation from the horse. Finding Thawai's suffering unbearable, his friends and family, including his coach and mentor try to get Stallone back. The owner, who was once a great polo player, finally hands over the pony to Thawai for the love of the game.

== Cast ==
- Sinam Shaolin as Thawai
- Oinam Prafullochandra as Ibopishak, Thawai's father
- Ayekpam Shanti as Ashangbi, Thawai's mother
- Leishangthem Tonthoi as Nganthoi
- Romesh Elangbam as Romesh
- Jasmin Elangbam as Latabi
- Sukanya Haorongbam as Bembem
- Chajing Deben as Latabi's father
- Angom Phiroj as Dhojo
- Yengkhom Ingocha as Police
- Barlin
- Surjakanya
- Surajlata
- Ningthou Ranjan
- Eigya Inaocha

== Accolades ==
The movie won the National Film Award for Best Feature Film in Manipuri at the 67th National Film Awards. The citation for the National Award reads, "A thrilling film revealing the present plight and conditions of polo players and ponies in their place of origin."

Sinam Shaolin who plays the role of Thawai won the Best Child Artist award at the 13th Manipur State Film Awards 2020.

Award	Category	Winner's name	Result
67th National Film Awards	Best Feature Film in Manipuri	Producer: Luwang Apokpa Mamikol Productions; Directors: Bobby Wahengbam & Maipaksana Haorongbam	Won
13th Manipur State Film Awards 2020	Special Jury Mention	Producer: Dr. K. Sushila Leima; Directors: Bobby Wahengbam & Maipaksana Haorongbam	Won
13th Manipur State Film Awards 2020	Best Child Artist	Sinam Shaolin	Won
13th Manipur State Film Awards 2020	Best Costume Design	Abujam Ragini & Wangjam Chandrima	Won
13th Manipur State Film Awards 2020	Special Jury Mention	Yendrenbam Manitomba (Art Direction)	Won
