= National School of Drama, Tripura =

- Type: Public
- Established: 17 November 2011
- Parent institution: National School of Drama
- Affiliations: Sangeet Natak Academy
- Chairman: Paresh Rawal
- Director: Biplob Borkakoti
- Location: Nazrul Kalakshetra Complex, North Banamalipur, Shahid Khudiram Basu Lane, Agartala, Tripura, Agartala, 799007
- Campus: Urban
- Website: tripura.nsd.gov.in

The National School of Drama, New Delhi, has established its camp office National School of Drama Theatre-in-Education Wing Tripura in conjunction with the Department of Information & Cultural Affairs and Higher Education, Government of Tripura, in Agartala, with effect from 17 November 2011. The wing provides a one-year residential PG certificate course in Theatre-in-Education to students from the Northeast, the rest of India, and around the world.

== Course ==
The wing only accepts students from India for a one-year residential certificate study in Theatre-in-Education. The programme is designed to prepare theatre teachers for schools, artists for TIE activities, and TIE resource people to train children and teachers using TIE methodology.

== Plays Curated ==
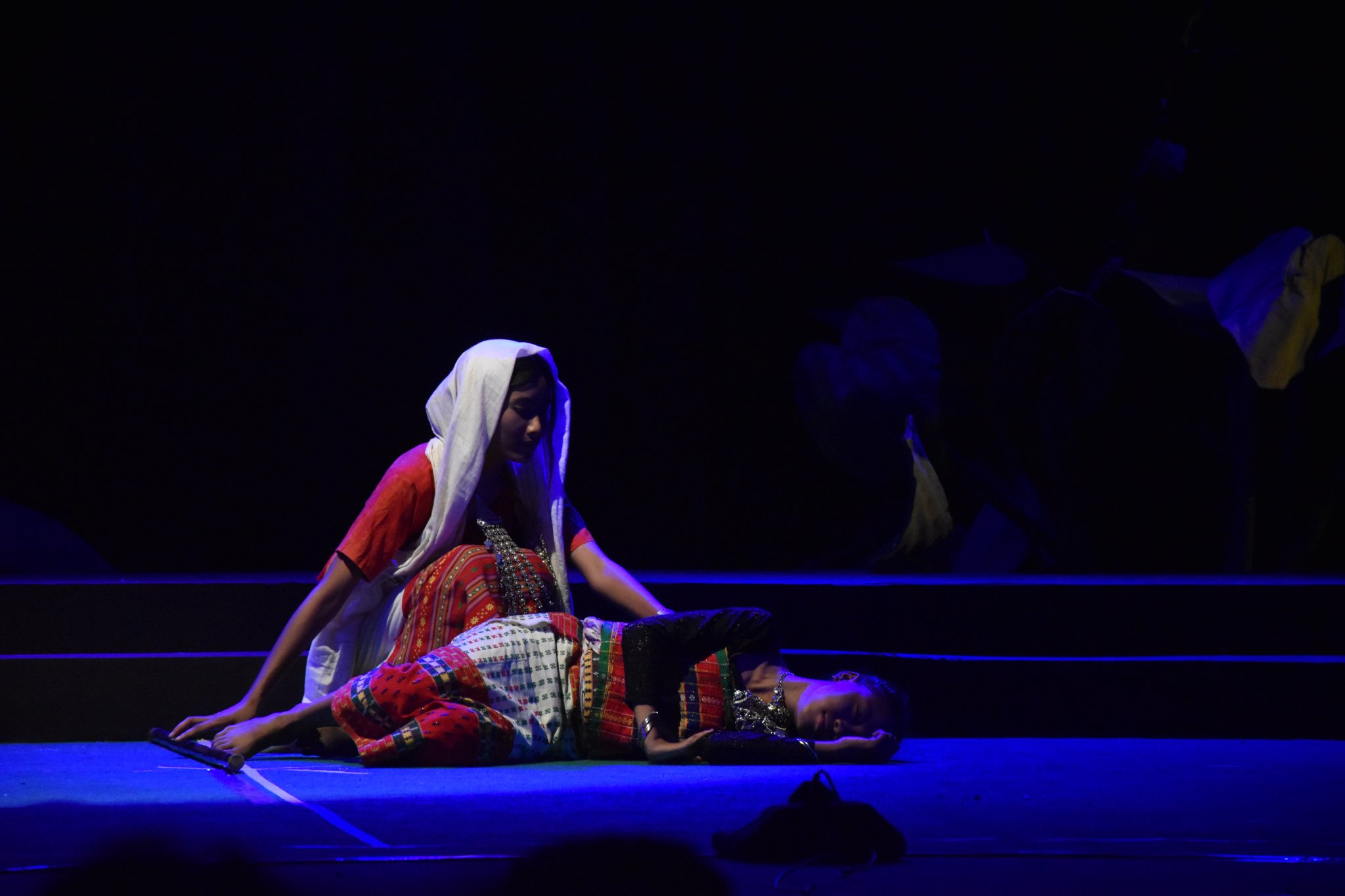
Students performing Plays at National School of Drama, Tripura

- Tede Mede Qisse
- In Your Hands
- In The Name of an Unborn Baby
- Laxman Ka Haktishel
- Par Hume Khelna Hai
- Toofan Mail Dragon Tale
- Pathorer Poth Stony Path
- Bhago Bhuttu Aayaa

== Festivals ==
- Poorvottar Natya Samaroh
- Poorvottar Rang Utsav
- Bharat Rang Mahotsav
- Poorvottar Rashtriya Rang Utsav
- Bal Sangam

== Notable faculty ==
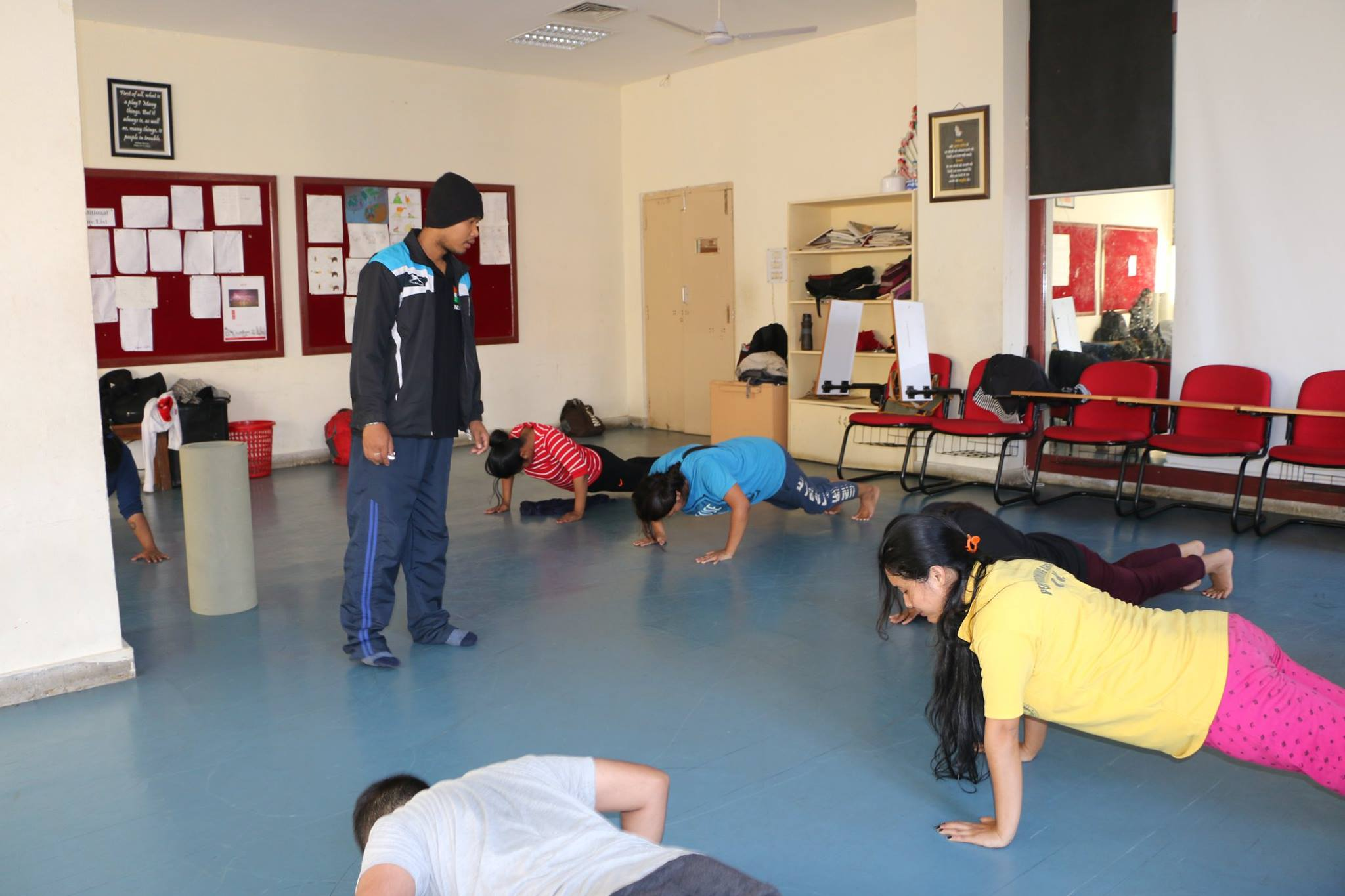
Filmmaker and film scholar Aloy Deb Barma training students at National School of Drama, Tripura

- Dr. Jyostna Tiwari, Art in Education

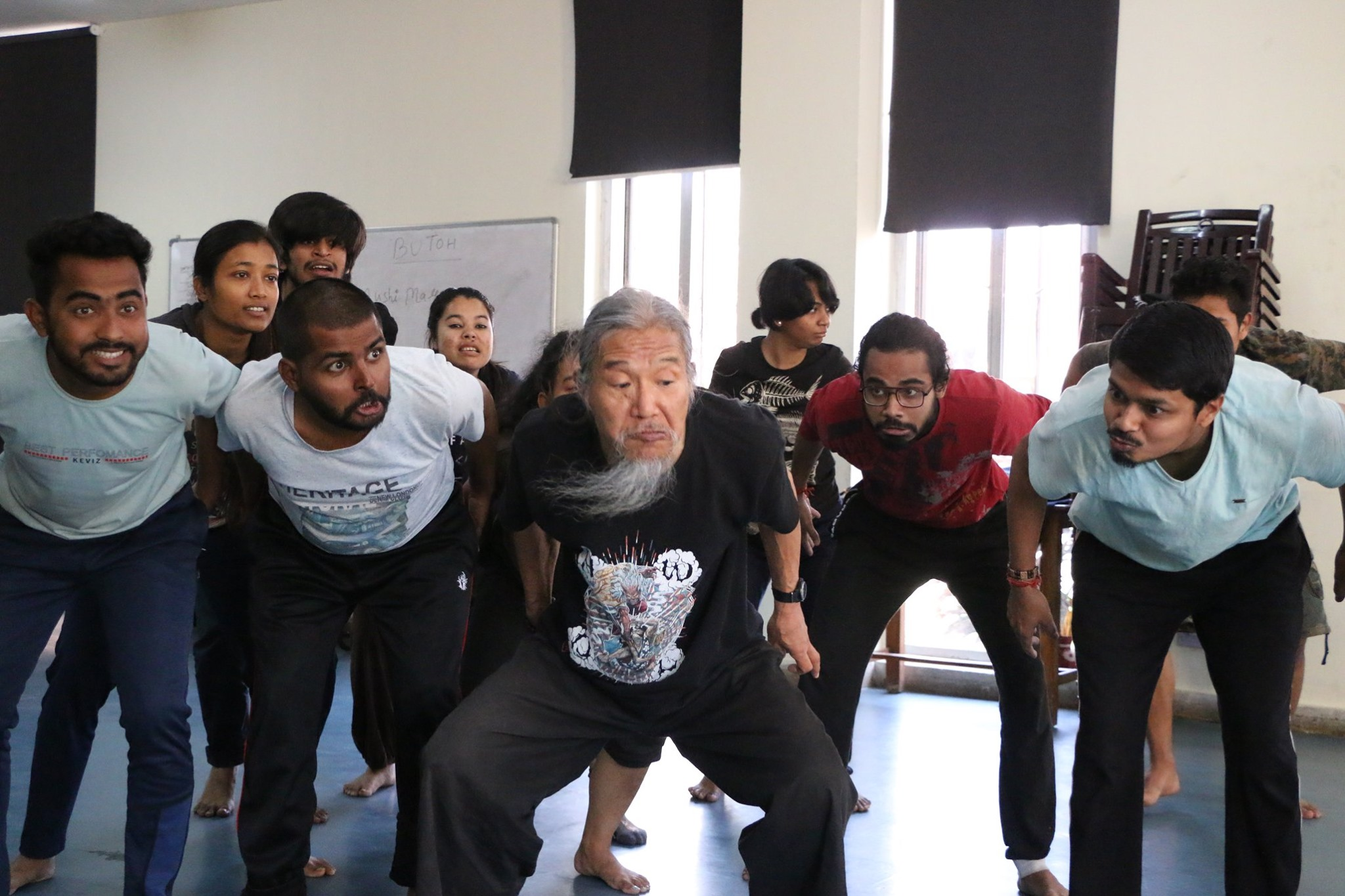
Dancer, Choreographer Mushimaru Fujieda training students at National School of Drama, Tripura

- Vijay Kumar Singh, Theatre in Education
- Radha Ramaswamy, Theatre of the oppressed
- Maya Rao (TIR), Drama in Education
- Lewis Frost (UK), Drama in Education
- Walter Peter, Drama in Education
- Moloyashree Hasmi, Drama in Education
- Suwarn Rawat, Drama in Education
- Ashwath Bhatt, Clowning
- Sukhmani Kohli, Clowning
- Hailey Jones (USA), Clowning
- Shriranga Godbole, Grips Theatre
- Jyoti Bose, Grips Theatre
- Vibhawari Deshpande, Grips Theatre
- Aloy Deb Barma, Martial Arts/Acrobatics & Film study
- Thawai Thiyam, Production Process
- Mr. Ibomcha, Production Process
- Aruna Kumar Malik, Property/Mask Making
- Shiv Prasad Gound, Property/Mask Making
- N.Jadumani Singh, Handling Materials
- Anurupa Roy, Puppet Making & Handling Dadi Pudumjee
- Carol Sterling (USA), Puppet Making & Handling Dadi Pudumjee
- Deepan Sivaraman, Scenography
- Moinul Haque, Mime
- Manoj Nayar, Mime
- Anjala Maharishi, Classical Drama & Acting
- Himanshu Joshi, Light Design
- Babita Pandey, Play reading/Scenic Design & Costume Design
- D.R.Ankur, History of World Drama
- Kriti Jain, History of Indian Drama
- S.B.Kulkarni, Yoga
- Sajjad Khan, Voice & Speech
- Vijay Acharjee, Magic
- Mushimaru Fujieda (Japan), Butoh/Dance

== Notable alumni ==
- Vinod Saroj
- Leishangthem Tonthoingambi Devi

== See also ==
- Education in India
- Education in Tripura
- Tribal Research and Cultural Institute
- National School of Drama
