= Kaboklei =

- Poster
- Directed by: Pilu Heigrujam
- Screenplay by: Narendra Ningomba
- Story by: Khaidem Pramodini
- Produced by: Bandana Maisnam
- Starring: Manda Leima; Hamom Sadananda; Huirem Seema
- Cinematography: Nanda
- Edited by: Pilu Heigurjam
- Music by: Ranbir Thouna
- Production company: Bandana Films
- Distributed by: Bandana Films
- Release date: 9 January 2009
- Running time: 148 minutes
- Country: India
- Language: Meiteilon (Manipuri)

Kaboklei (English: Cape jasmine flower) is a 2009 Manipuri film directed by Pilu Heigrujam and produced by Bandana Maisnam. It stars Manda Leima as the titular protagonist with Hamom Sadananda and Huirem Seema in the lead roles. The screenplay by Narendra Ningomba is based on Khaidem Pramodini's play Kabok Oikhrabi Kaboklei. The film was released at Hapta Kangjeibung, Imphal on 9 January 2009.

Kaboklei was part of the official selection at the 7th Manipur State Film Festival 2010 organised by Manipur Film Development Corporation (MFDC).

== Cast ==
- Manda Leima as Kaboklei
- Hamom Sadananda as Pamheiba
- Huirem Seema as Kaboklei's mother
- Mutum Lukhoi as Kaboklei's father
- Sagolsem Dhanamanjuri as Indu
- Sorri Senjam as Khagemba, Pamheiba's younger brother
- Wangkhem Lalitkumar as Minister, Pamheiba's father
- R.K. Hemabati as Minister's wife
- Narendra Ningomba as Manihar
- Heisnam Geeta as Manihar's wife
- Bhogen as Kaboklei's local brother
- Rina Yengkhom as Thagoi, Nurse
- Ratan Leitanthem

== Reception ==
Pradip Phanjoubam wrote about the film in Imphal Review of Arts and Politics.

== Accolades ==
The movie won an award at the 7th Manipur State Film Festival 2010.

Award	Category	Winner's name	Result
7th Manipur State Film Festival 2010	Best Actor in a Leading Role - Female	Manda Leima	Won

== Soundtrack ==
Ranbir Thouna composed the soundtrack for the film and Dr. S. Ibomcha and Khaidem Imo wrote the lyrics. The songs are titled Mamingtagi Hingliba Punsi and Lansonbigi Lamyaida.

No.	Title	Lyrics	Music	Singer(s)	Length
1.	"Mamingtagi Hingliba Punsini"	Khaidem Imo	Ranbir Thouna	Pushparani Huidrom	06:07
2.	"Lansonbigi Lamyaida"	Dr. S. Ibomcha	Ranbir Thouna	N/A	03:35
Total length:					9:42
