= Nongmaithem Pahari =

Nongmaithem Chittaranjan Singh, more commonly known as Nongmaithem Pahari, was a Manipuri by birth, an Indian singer, a composer, a lyricist, revolutionist and a writer. He was a Manipuri (a language in the 8th schedule of the Indian constitution) singer. He was perhaps the most prolific modern Meitei singer before his death on 18 October 2006 in Imphal, Manipur, India.

== Career ==
Nongmaithem Pahari's greatest contribution to the culture of Manipur is the way he introduced a new era of music. He was important in consolidating the popularity of modern Meitei music.

Pahari was born on 28 August 1934 in Imphal, Manipur. His father, Nongmaithem Thanil, represented the nobility of that time and was an avid theatre activist. Pahari's affinity towards music was manifested early in his childhood when he was heavily influenced by the likes of KL Saigal, Pankaj Mullick and Manna Dey.

Undying Melodies is considered to be one of Pahari's best albums. This album features a variety of his hits like "Ningsingli meraagi thabaldo", "Eigee eshei saklaroi", "Ahingda khongbee taamna", "Nangee maithong urubada" and "Nangi Napalgi".

The majority of Pahari's songs were written by B. Jayantakumar Sharma, who composed music for many feature films and many theatre dramas. He had been decorated with almost all the Awards and recognition in the state pertaining to music and culture.

Pahari wrote a book titled Eigi Diaridagi meaning "From My Dairy". It was mainly about his experiences inside the Imphal and Tripura Jail with brief but important mention of the real genesis of the political and armed revolution in Manipur.

He was one of the founding members of United National Liberation Front, a revolutionary front formed in Manipur on 24 October 1964 which is still one of the largest insurgent groups in Manipur.

Pahari retired as the Station Director of Doordarshan Kendra Imphal (television broadcasting station of Manipur) before which he served as the Station Director of All India Radio in various places including Imphal, Kohima and Gangtok. He was the President of Manipur Dramatic Union, Imphal and All Manipur Matam Ishei Kanglup. He also headed many other societies and cultural groups of the state.

== Films and albums ==
- Ngak-E-Ko Nangshe (1974) (Music Direction & Playback)
- Khonjel (1981)
- Sanakeithel (1983) (Story & Music Direction)
- Khuthang Lamjel (Music Direction & Playback)
- Yairipok Thambalnu (1984) (Music Direction & Playback)
- Sanamanbi Sanarei (1995) (Music Direction)
- Meichak Meichak (1998) (Music Direction & Playback)

== Albums ==
- Undying Melodies
- Thariktha
- Greatest Hits
- The Best of Melody King
- Golden Hits
- Dolaithakta Chatlibi
