= Phijigee Mani =

- Poster
- Directed by: Oinam Gautam Singh
- Screenplay by: Y. Kumarjit
- Story by: Takhelchangbam Ongbi Medha Sharmi
- Produced by: Takhelchangbam Ongbi Medha Sharmi
- Starring: Gurumayum Bonny; Leishangthem Tonthoingambi Devi; Abenao Elangbam
- Cinematography: Geet Gulapee
- Edited by: Oinam Gautam Singh
- Music by: Sorri Senjam
- Production company: Radha Govind Films
- Distributed by: Radha Govind Films
- Release date: November 2011 (IFFI)
- Running time: 111 minutes
- Country: India
- Language: Meiteilon (Manipuri)

Phijigee Mani (English: My Only Gem; also written as Phijigi Mani) is a 2011 Manipuri film directed by O. Gautam, co-written and produced by Takhelchangbam Ongbi Medha Sharmi, under the banner of Radha Govind Films. It stars an ensemble cast including Gurumayum Bonny, Abenao Elangbam and Leishangthem Tonthoingambi Devi. It won the National Film Award for Best Feature Film in Manipuri and Best Supporting Actress (Leishangthem Tonthoingambi Devi) awards at the 59th National Film Awards. Phijigee Mani was also selected for Indian Panorama of 42nd International Film Festival of India 2011.

Phijigee Mani was screened at Habitat Film Festival 2012, New Delhi. It was also screened in the North-East Film Festival 2014 held at Siri Fort Auditorium, New Delhi.

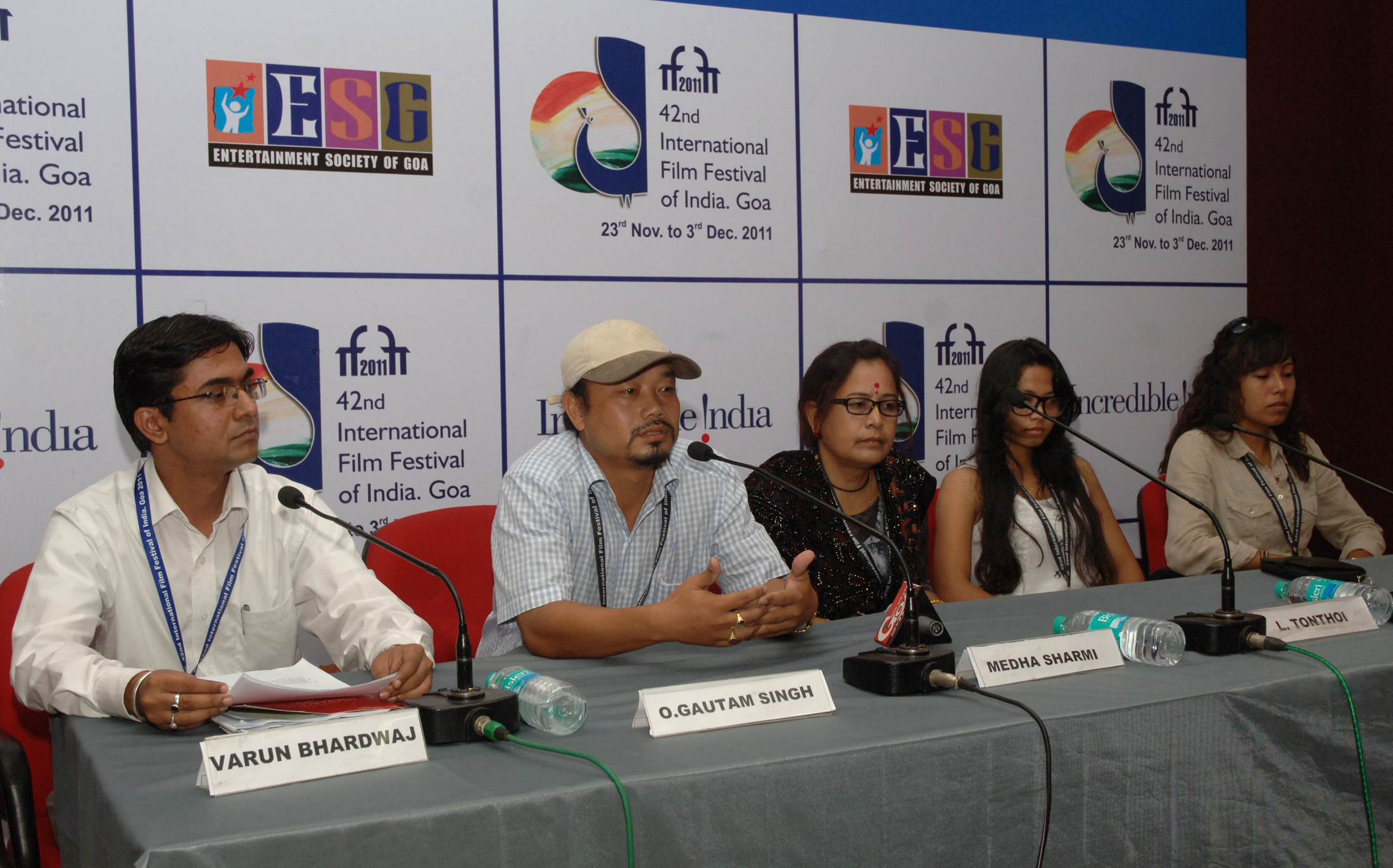
O. Gautam addressing a press conference during the 42nd IFFI 2011

== Cast ==
- Gurumayum Bonny as Sanajaoba
- Leishangthem Tonthoingambi Devi as Yaiphabee, Sanajaoba's younger sister
- Abenao Elangbam as Bicha
- Y. Kumarjit as Sanajaoba's father
- Hijam Shyamdhani as Yaiphabi's uncle
- Ayekpam Shanti as Sanajaoba's mother
- R.K. Sorojini Devi as Yaiphabi's aunty
- Venus as Yaiphabi's love interest
- Momita as Jessica, Sanajaoba's wife
- Baby Rainy as Langlen, Sanajaoba's daughter

== Accolades ==
Leishangthem Tonthoingambi Devi won the Best Supporting Actress Award at the 59th National Film Awards. The movie also won the National Film Award for Best Feature Film in Manipuri. The citation for the National Award reads, "For a sensitive depiction of the complex displacements that are occurring today in the North Eastern states. The director shows in the most graceful manner the consequences of displaced socio-political priorities which dislodge the young and disturb traditional family moorings and the even more ancient tribal societal systems".

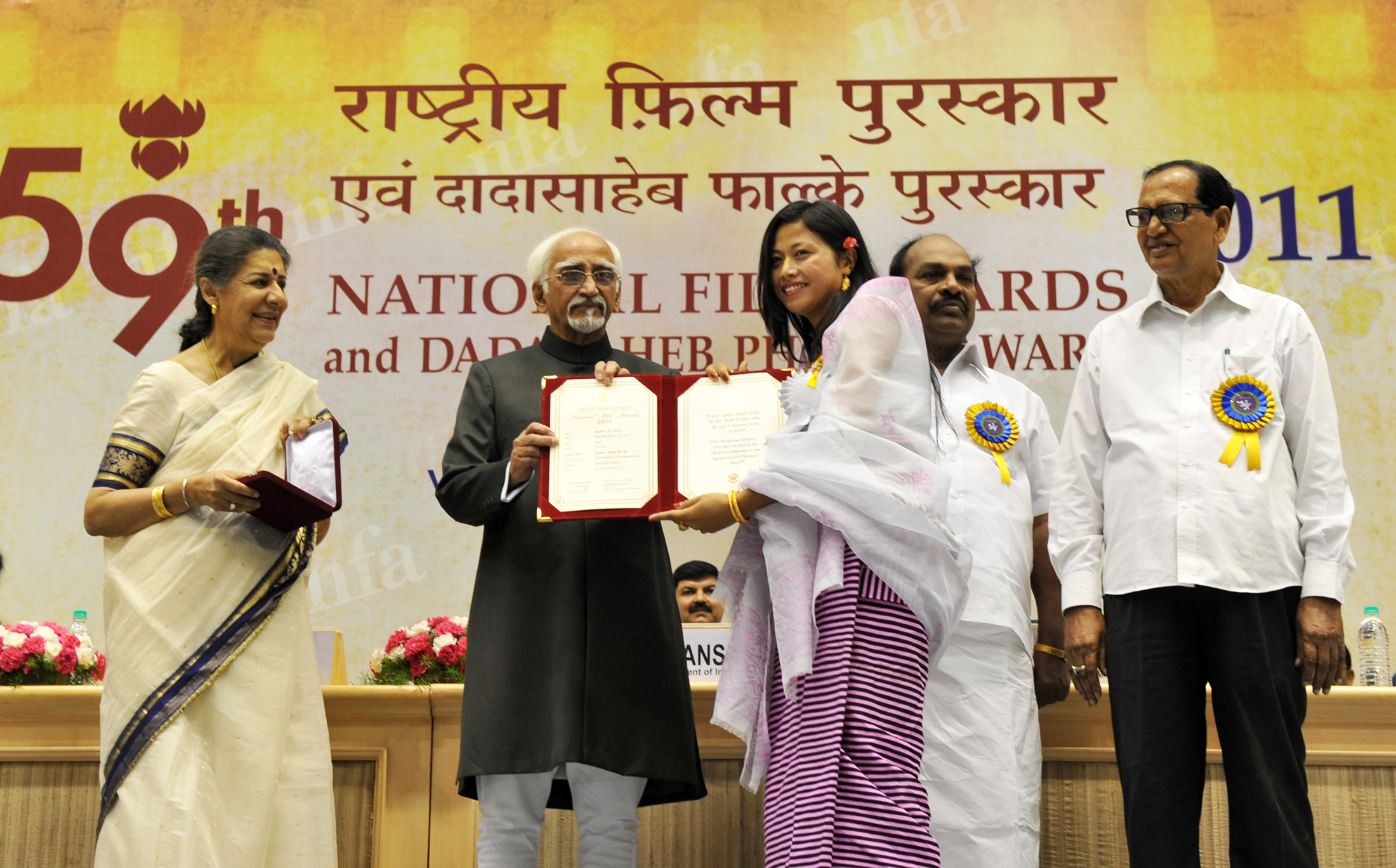
Tonthoi receiving the Best Supporting Actress Award at the 59th National Film Awards.
