= Thawanmichakna Kenkhrabada =

- Movie Poster
- Directed by: Kishorekumar
- Screenplay by: L. Dhanachandra
- Story by: Chan & Ishomani
- Produced by: Tollo, Chan & Nimai
- Starring: Amarjeet Rajkumar; Huirem Seema
- Music by: S. Tijendra
- Release date: 25 April 2002
- Country: India
- Language: Meiteilon (Manipuri)

Thawanmichakna Kenkhrabada (English: When The Star Falls) is a 2002 Manipuri film directed by Kishorekumar and produced by Tollo, Chan & Nimai. It stars Amarjeet Rajkumar and Huirem Seema in the lead roles. It is a family drama with slices of romance and tragedy. The film was released at Pratap Talkies, Imphal on 25 April 2002.

== Plot ==
The film tells the love story of Jiten and Meera. Jiten is the son of a rich businessman Biren, while Meera is a disabled singer. Jiten falls in love with Meera when he visits his home state during his vacation. They get married, but when Jiten returns to Pune to complete his studies, Meera returns to her own home, being unable to bear the ill-treatment by her in-laws, which cause the death of her one and only grandmother. Meera then survives as a music teacher. Bira and his wife only understand lately that disability is a glorious gift of God only when their daughter Sandhya met with an accident. The film's climax is achieved when Jiten found Meera and are reunited after a long separation.

== Cast ==
- Amarjeet Rajkumar as Jiten
- Huirem Seema as Meera
- Wangkhem Lalitkumar
- Meera
- Medha
- Arun
- Kishorekumar

== Soundtrack ==
Sagolsem Tijendra composed the songs for the movie and Doneshwor Konsam, Birmani Heisnam, Rajen Yengkokpam, S. Premila wrote the lyrics.

Thawanmichakna Kenkhrabada

Soundtrack album by China Doll Premila, Sharat, W. Premila, Sonali Mukherjee, R.K. Nandeshwori, Umoni, Sunita Nepram, Pahari Macha
- Released: 2002
- Genre: Feature film soundtrack
- Length: 37:32
- Producer: Tollo, Chan & Nimai

No.	Title	Lyrics	Music	Singer(s)	Length
1.	"Channabanisu"	Doneshwor Konsam	Sagolsem Tijendra	Umoni	05:35
2.	"Eigi Punshigee Esei"	Rajen Yengkokpam	Sagolsem Tijendra	Sunita Nepram	05:10
3.	"Lamhellabi"	Rajen Yengkokpam	Sagolsem Tijendra	China Doll Premila	04:12
4.	"Mahousai Ayukse"	S. Premila	Sagolsem Tijendra	Sharat & W. Premila	06:40
5.	"Nanggi Maithong"	Doneshwor Konsam	Sagolsem Tijendra	Pahari Macha	05:50
6.	"Thabalna Epom Hourakpa"	Birmani Heisnam	Sagolsem Tijendra	R.K. Nandeshwori	05:00
7.	"Unalakta"	Birmani Heisnam	Sagolsem Tijendra	Sonali Mukherjee	05:00
Total length:					37:32
