= Tillaikhombee =

- Theatrical release poster
- Directed by: Khwairakpam Bishwamittra
- Written by: Ranjit Ningthouja
- Produced by: Jiri Budha
- Starring: Raju Nong; Huirem Seema; Nillachandra; Sonia Hijam
- Cinematography: Imo Yumnam; Bisho; Aboi
- Edited by: Mohendro
- Music by: O. Geet; Background score: R.K. Jiten
- Production companies: Ningshing Mami Production, Jiribam
- Distributed by: Ningshing Mami Production, Jiribam
- Release date: 9 April 2010
- Running time: 140 minutes
- Country: India
- Language: Meiteilon (Manipuri)

Tillaikhombee (English: Caterpillar, also written as Tillaikhombi) is a 2010 Manipuri film directed by Khwairakpam Bishwamittra and produced by Jiri Budha under the banner of Ningshing Mami Production, Jiribam. It stars Raju Nong, Huirem Seema, Nillachandra and Sonia Hijam in the lead roles. The movie was premiered as a press show at Cinema Paradiso, Thangal Bazar on 9 April 2010. It was later released at Pratap Talkies, Paona Bazar and many other theatres of Manipur in 2010.

The film bagged two awards at the 1st MANIFA 2012 organised by Sahitya Seva Samiti, Kakching.

== Plot ==
The film is about love, hatred, corruption, competition for power and revenge. Yaiphaba and Lemba become victims to the trap set up by ill-minded Keirenjao. He befriends politicians, police and militants to enable him to execute illegal works successfully. In sharp contrast, Memthoi (Keirenjao's daughter) loves Nungshiba (Yaiphaba's adopted son). With the passage of time, the rule of karma plays out and Keirenjao gets killed.

== Cast ==
- Raju Nong as Yaiphaba
- Huirem Seema as Likla
- Nillachandra as Nungshiba, Yaiphaba's adopted son
- Sonia Hijam as Memthoi, Keirenjao's daughter
- Lairenjam Olen as Lemba
- Oinam Prafullochandra as Keirenjao
- Gurumayum Priyogopal as Minister
- Philem Puneshori as Keirenjao's wife
- Khoibam Homeshwori as Minister's wife
- Laishram Lalitabi as Yaiphaba's mother
- Khuraijam Lingjelthoibi as Lemba's wife
- Gitchandra Chongtham as Thoiren
- Momoko Khangembam as Tombi, Memthoi's friend
- Bimola as School Principal
- Surjit Saikhom
- Khekman Ratan
- Irom Shyamkishore

== Accolades ==
Tillaikhombee won two awards out of the 8 nominations at the 1st Sahitya Seva Samiti MANIFA held in 2012. Raju Nong and Bishwamittra won the Best Actor in a Leading Role - Male and Best Direction awards respectively.

Award	Category	Winner's name	Result
1st SSS MANIFA 2012	Best Actor in a Leading Role - Male	Raju Nong	Won
1st SSS MANIFA 2012	Best Direction	Khwairakpam Bishwamittra	Won
1st SSS MANIFA 2012	Best Feature Film	Producer: Jiri Budha; Director: Bishwamittra	Nominated
1st SSS MANIFA 2012	Best Actor in a Leading Role - Female	Sonia Hijam	Nominated
1st SSS MANIFA 2012	Best Story	Ranjit Ningthouja	Nominated
1st SSS MANIFA 2012	Best Playback Singer - Female	Mandakini Takhellambam	Nominated
1st SSS MANIFA 2012	Best Music Director	O. Geet	Nominated
1st SSS MANIFA 2012	Best Lyricist	Ranjit Ningthouja	Nominated

== Soundtrack ==
O. Geet composed the soundtrack for the film and Khaidem Imo and Ranjit Ningthouja wrote the lyrics. The songs are titled Nangsu Chatlu Nanggi Maikeida and Sajibu Kalen Inga Ingen.

No.	Title	Lyrics	Music	Singer(s)	Length
1.	"Nangsu Chatlu Nanggi Maikeida"	Khaidem Imo	O. Geet	Solendro	05:25
2.	"Sajibu Kalen Inga Ingen"	Ranjit Ningthouja	O. Geet	Mandakini Takhellambam	04:46
Total length:					10:11
