= Pallepfam =

- Theatrical release poster
- Directed by: Wanglen Khundongbam
- Written by: Dr. Moirangthem Achumba
- Produced by: Wanglen Khundongbam
- Starring: Redy Yumnam; Leishangthem Tonthoi; Apsara Anoubam
- Cinematography: BK Sharma
- Music by: Tito Yumlembam
- Production company: The Bluebird Pictures
- Distributed by: The Bluebird Pictures
- Release date: 29 December 2014
- Country: India
- Language: Meiteilon (officially called Manipuri language)

Pallepfam (English: Destiny) is a 2014 Manipuri film produced and directed by Wanglen Khundongbam. The film features Redy Yumnam, Leishangthem Tonthoi and Apsara Anoubam in the lead roles. The story of the film was written by Dr. Moirangthem Achumba. Pallepfam is Wanglen Khundongbam's debut film. The movie was selected in the 46th International Film Festival of India (IFFI) 2015 under the section New Horizon from the North East.

Pallepfam was among the 48 best feature films of Pan-Indian Cinema screened in the 10th Habitat Film Festival 2015. The film also opened at the second edition of Fragrances from the Northeast 2015, New Delhi, a three-day festival of cinema from the Northeast. It got official selection at the National Film Archive of India, Pune, 2015.

== Cast ==
- Redy Yumnam as Ulen
- Leishangthem Tonthoi as Lembi
- Apsara Anoubam as Sana
- Ayekpam Shanti as Ulen's mother
- Venus
- Mukabala (Loya)
- Sagolsem Dhanamanjuri

== Accolades ==
Award	Category	Result
Film, North East, Itanagar 2016	Special Jury Mention	Won
