= 28th Kolkata International Film Festival =

2022 Indian film festival

- Official logo
- Opening film: Abhimaan by Hrishikesh Mukherjee
- Location: Netaji Indoor Stadium, Kolkata
- Founded: 1995
- Awards: Golden Royal Bengal Tiger Award for Best Film: Upon Entry and The Golden Wings of Watercocks; Golden Royal Bengal Tiger Award for Best Director: Ernesto Ardito, Virna Molina for Hitler's Witch
- Hosted by: Information and Cultural Affairs Department, Government of West Bengal
- No. of films: 183
- Festival date: Opening: 15 December 2022; Closing: 22 December 2022
- Website: kiff.in

Kolkata International Film Festival
- 29th 27th

The 28th Kolkata International Film Festival was held from 15 to 22 December 2022 at Netaji Indoor Stadium, in Kolkata, India. The festival opened with 1973 film Abhimaan, by Hrishikesh Mukherjee. 183 films including 130 feature films and 52 short and documentary films from 42 countries were screened during 7 days of the festival. The opening ceremony was attended by West Bengal Chief Minister Mamata Banerjee, Amitabh Bachchan, Jaya Bachchan, Shah Rukh Khan, Rani Mukerji, Mahesh Bhatt and cricketer Sourav Ganguly.

The festival closed on 22 December at Rabindra Sadan hosted by Saheb Chatterjee. Spanish film Upon Entry by Alejandro Rojas, and Juan Sebastian Vasquez and Bangladeshi film The Golden Wings of Watercocks by Muhammad Quayum, jointly won the Golden Royal Bengal Tiger Award for best film, whereas Golden Royal Bengal Tiger Award for best director was won by Ernesto Ardito and Virna Molina for their film Hitler's Witch.

== Highlights of the year ==
Retrospective on Amitabh Bachchan

A retrospective on Amitabh Bachchan, celebrating his life and works, was presented by screening his films.

Paying homage through special tribute

Filmmaker Tarun Majumdar, veteran actor Pradip Mukherjee, classical musician Shivkumar Sharma and American actor Angela Lansbury, who all died in 2022, were given special tribute in the festival.

Centenary celebration

Centenary tribute was given to the French film director and screenwriter Alain Resnais, Italian filmmaker Pier Paolo Pasolini, Greek film actor and director Michael Cacoyannis, alongside Indian cinema's legendary figures Dilip Kumar, Asit Sen, Hrishikesh Mukherjee, Bharati Devi, K. Asif and Hindustani classical musician Ali Akbar Khan.

Game On, A new category

From this year a new category 'Game On' was introduced. Seven sports related films including Soumitra Chatterjee's 1984 film Kony, 2016 film M.S. Dhoni: The Untold Story, 2021 film 83 were screened to promote sports among young generation.

== Jury ==
=== International jury ===
International Competition: Innovation in Moving Images

- Iliana Zakopoulou, (Chairperson), Head of the Department of Sales and Promotion (Hellas Film) of the Greek Film Centre.
- Mano Khalil, a Kurdish-Swiss film director and producer
- Shalini Dore, an editor with Variety
- Tanvir Mokammel, current director of Bangladesh Film Institute (BFI)
- Tannishtha Chatterjee, an Indian actress and director

Competition on Indian Language's Films

- Siddiq Barmak, (Chairperson), an Afghan film director and producer
- Gulnara Abikeyeva, a Kazakh film critic and film researcher
- Viera Langerová, Slovak film critic, lecturer and scriptwriter

Asian Select (NETPAC Award)

- Latika Padgaonkar (Chairperson), a columnist, translator and editor of several books, also member of the NETPAC (India), and the FIPRESCI.
- Italo Spinelli, a director and author, the founder and artistic director of Asiatica International Film Festival, Rome
- Supriya Suri, the founding member of Cinedarbaar in India and a film curator, and runs her production company Maison Su.

Competition on Indian Short Films

- Jaya Seal Ghosh, an Indian actress, dancer and producer
- Prasun Chatterjee, an Indian filmmaker, also the founder of Kathak Talkies, a Kolkata-based film production company
- Raajhorshee De, a writer and creative director, also project head for two channels in Bengal— Colors Bangla and Zee Bangla.

Competition on Indian Documentary Films

- Anindita Choudhury, the current Vice President of Original Content for Zee5 Kolkata and Bangladesh
- Manas Mukul Pal, an Indian film director and writer
- Sani Ghose Ray, a creative entrepreneur. Currently heading Acropoliis Entertainment

== Official selection ==
=== Inaugural Film ===
Year	English title	Original title	Director(s)	Production countrie(s)
Inaugural Film
1973	Abhimaan		Hrishikesh Mukherjee	India

=== Competition categories ===
==== International Competition: Innovation in Moving Images ====
Highlighted title indicates award winner

Year	English title	Original title	Director(s)	Production countrie(s)
2021	The Golden Wings of Watercocks	Kura Pokhhir Shunye Ura	Muhammad Quayum	Bangladesh
2022	Silent Glory	Shokouhe Khamoush	Nahid Hassanzadeh	Iran
2022	The Lord of Creations	Samaresh Basur Projapoti	Subrata Sen	India
2022	The Warm Blues		Rishabh Kumar	India
2022	The Deadman's Bride	Mireasa Mortului	Cornel Gheorghita	Romania
2022	First snow	ПЕРВЫЙ СНЕГ	Nathalia Konchalovsky	Russia
2022	In Limbo	Mezhsezone	Alexander Hant	Russia
2022	The Wedding Parade	Berbu	Sevinaz Evdike	Syria
2022	The village	AUL	Serik Aprymov	Kazakh
2022	Hitler's Witch	La Bruja De Hitler	Ernesto Ardito, Virna Molina	Argentina
2022	Europe		Philip Scheffner	Germany, France
2022	Upon Entry		Alejandro Rojas, Juan Sebastian Vasquez	Spain
2022	Travels inside foreign heads		Antonio Amaral	France
2022	Dirty, Difficult, Dangerous		Wissam Charaf	France, Italy

==== Competition on Indian Language's Films ====
Highlighted title indicates award winner

Year	English title	Original title	Director(s)
2022	The Faded Footprints	Lokkhir Paa	Abhik Das
2022	Salt Of The Earth	Bhoomiyude Uppu	Sunny Joseph
2022	Colours of a Rebel Sprout	Akoman	Pranjal Saikia
2022	Sattha Soothakada Suttha	Sattha Soothakada Suttha	Therunalli D
2022	Beginning		Jagan Vijaya
2022	Tora's Husband		Rima Das
2022	The Fallen are Connected		B.S. Pradeep Varma
2022	Muthayya		Bhaskar Maurya
2022	Global Aadgaon		Anilkumar Salve
2022	Naanera		Deepankar Prakash
2022	OCD		Soukarya Ghosal
2022	If Only Trees Could Talk	Sikaisal	Bobby Sarma Baruah
2022	Sthalam		Bijukumar Damodaran
2022	The Terrace	Chhaad	Indrani Chakraborty

==== Asian Select (NETPAC Award) ====
Year	English title	Original title	Director(s)	Production countrie(s)
2022	Home for Sale	Продаётся дом	Taalaibek Kulmendeev	Kyrgyzstan
2022	The River Breathes	Ano ko no Yume wo Mizuninagashite	Shoji Toyama	Japan
2022	The Keysmith	Chabiwala	Raja Ghosh	India
2022	Fortune	DOV	Muhiddin Muzaffar	Tajikistan
2022	Incredible Coorg	Pommale Kodag	Kottukattira Prakash Kariyappa	India
2022	Doosra	Doosra	Channa Deshapriya	Sri Lanka
2022	Hijab	Munni	Ismail Moodushedde	India

==== Competition on Indian Short Films ====
English title	Original title	Director(s)
Outlaw's Gun	Bandit'S Bazooka	Divyesh Gandhi
The Cremation	Daah Sanskaar	Falguni Bhakta
The Arrival of Shurponakha	Shuruponakhar Agomon	Suchandra Vaaniya
I am, Mehmood	Mein, Mehmood	Prataya Saha
Void	Xunyota	Nabapan Deka
The Divine Touch	Haater Sporsho	Dr. Prosenjit Choudhury

==== Competition on Indian Documentary Films ====
English title	Original title	Director(s)
In Search Of Neelpawan Baruah	Neelpawan Baruak Bichari	Keshar Jyoti Das
My Country	Amar Desh	Suman Sen Gupta, Subhra Mukhopadhyay, Saswata Sarkar
Imroz - A Walkdown Memory Lane		Harjit Singh
Nybreum - The Unsettled Shade		Neha Sharma
Dream For Livelihood	Bhat Kaporer Swapno	Raktim Mondal
Mizo Soundscapes		Joshy Joseph
The Edge Of The Sunshine	Dhoop Kinaara	Shadab Farooq

=== Non-Competition Categories ===
==== Amitabh Bachchan: A Living Legend ====
Source:|

Year	English title	Original title	Director(s)
1975	Deewaar		Yash Chopra
2005	Black		Sanjay Leela Bhansali
1979	Kaala Patthar		Yash Chopra
1973	Abhimaan		Hrishikesh Mukherjee
1982	Shakti		Ramesh Sippy
1981	Silsila		Yash Chopra
1971	Anand		Hrishikesh Mukherjee
1982	Bemisal		Hrishikesh Mukherjee

==== Bengali Panorama ====
Year	English title	Original title	Director(s)
2022	Grassland	Ghasjomi	Sumantra Roy
2022	NeetiShastra	নীতিশাস্ত্র	Arunava Khasnobis
2022	Taranga - The Wave of Life	তারাঙ্গা	Palash Dey

==== Centenary tribute ====
International

Year	English title	Original title	Production countrie(s)
Alain Resnais
2006	Private Fears in Public Places	Cœurs	France
1959	Hiroshima, My Love	Hiroshima mon amour	France
Pier Paolo Pasolini
1964	The Gospel According to St. Matthew	Il vangelo secondo Matteo	Italy
1976	Salò, or the 120 Days of Sodom	Salò o le 120 giornate di Sodoma	Italy, France
1967	Oedipus Rex	Edipo re	Italy, Morocco
Michael Cacoyannis
1971	The Trojan Women		United States, United Kingdom, Greece
1977	Iphigenia		Greece
1962	Electra		Greece
1964	Zorba the Greek	Alexis Zorbas	Greece, United States

Indian

Year	English title	Original title	Director(s)
Dilip Kumar
1960	The Great Mughal	Mughal-e-Azam	K. Asif
1961	Ganga Jamuna	Gunga Jumna	Nitin Bose
1982	Power	Shakti	Ramesh Sippy
Bharati Devi
1959	The Holy Island	Sagar Sangamey	Debaki Bose
Ali Akbar Khan
1960	Hungry Stones	Khudhito Pashan	Tapan Sinha

Year	English title	Original title
Hrishikesh Mukherjee
1975	Mili	
1973	Anuradha	
1971	Anand	
1966	Anupama	
1973	Anari	
1982	Bemisal	
1969	Satyakam	
1973	Abhimaan	
Asit Sen
1956	Chalachal	
1963	Uttar Falguni	
1959	Deep Jwele Jaai	
K. Asif
1960	Mughal-e-Azam	

==== Cinema International ====
Year	English title	Original title	Director(s)	Production countrie(s)
2022	Decision to Leave	헤어질 결심	Park Chan-wook	South Korea
2022	Alcarràs	Alcarràs - L'ultimo raccolto	Carla Simón	Spain, Italy
2022	The Five Devils	Les cinq diables	Léa Mysius	France
2022	One Fine Morning	Un beau matin	Mia Hansen-Løve	France, Germany
2022	Close		Lukas Dhont	Belgium, Netherlands, France
2022	Rule 34	Regra 34	Julia Murat	Brazil, France
2022	Prison 77	Modelo 77	Alberto Rodríguez	Spain
2022	When the Waves Are Gone	Kapag Wala Nang Mga Alon	Lav Diaz	Philippines, France, Portugal, Denmark
2022	The Blue Caftan	Le Bleu du caftan	Maryam Touzani	France, Morocco, Belgium, Denmark
2022	How Is Katia?	Yak Tam Katia?	Christina Tynkevych	Ukraine
2019	Victim	Obet	Michal Blasko	Slovakia
2022	Nightsiren	Svetlonoc	Tereza Nvotová	Czech Republic, Slovakia, France
2022	Queens	Malikates	Yasmine Benkiran	France, Morocco
2022	Heartbeast		Anio Suni	Norway
2022	Alma Viva		Cristèle Alves Meira	Portugal, France, Belgium
2022	Joyland		Saim Sadiq	Pakistan
2022	Blanquita		Fernando Guzzoni	Chile
2022	Boy from Heaven		Tarik Saleh	Sweden, France, Finland
2022	I Have Electric Dreams	Tengo sueños eléctricos	Valentina Maurel	Belgium, France, Costa Rica
2022	Call Of God	Kõne taevast	Kim Ki-duk	South Korea
2022	The Whale		Darren Aronofsky	United States
2022	No Bears	خرس نیست (Khers Nist)	Jafar Panahi	Iran
2022	Triangle of Sadness		Ruben Östlund	Sweden, France, United Kingdom, Germany
2022	Broker	브로커	Hirokazu Kore-eda	South Korea
2022	The Ocean Angel	Maariya	Aruna Jayawardana	Sri Lanka
2022	Crimes of the Future		David Cronenberg	Canada, Greece
2022	My Sailor, My Love	Rakkaani Merikapteeni	Klaus Härö	Finland
2022	Rhinegold		Fatih Akin	German

==== Game On ====
Year	English title	Original title	Director(s)
2021	83		Kabir Khan
2016	M.S. Dhoni: The Untold Story		Neeraj Pandey
2007	Chak De! India		Shimit Amin
2016	Dangal		Nitesh Tiwari
2013	Bhaag Milkha Bhaag		Rakeysh Omprakash Mehra
2014	Mary Kom		Omung Kumar
1984	Kony		Saroj Dey

==== Homage ====
Four films will be showcased to pay homage to Jean-Luc Godard, the French-Swiss film director, screenwriter, and film critic.

Year	English title	Original title	Production countrie(s)
1965	Alphaville	Alphaville: une étrange aventure de Lemmy Caution	France
1961	A Woman Is a Woman	Une femme est une femme	France
1961	Contempt	Le Mépris	France, Italy
1960	Breathless	À bout de souffle	France

==== Short and Documentary Panorama ====
English title	Original title	Director(s)
Ripples Under the Skin		Farha Khatun
How do I Show the Ocean Space You Carried Inside You		Abeer Khan
The Ripple	Eewai	Khwairakpam Bishwamittra

==== Special Screening ====
Year	English title	Original title	Director(s)	Production countrie(s)
2022	Wind	Hawa	Mejbaur Rahman Sumon	Bangladesh
2020	Captive	Nazarband	Suman Mukhopadhyay	India
2022	Lakadbaggha	Lakadbaggha	Victor Mukherjee	India
2021	Neighbours		Mano Khalil	Syria

==== Special tribute ====
Year	English title	Original title	Director(s)	Production countrie(s)
Pradip Mukherjee
1976	The Middleman	Jana Aranya	Satyajit Ray	India
Shiv Kumar Sharma
1981	Continuation	Silsila	Yash Chopra	India
Angela Lansbury
1945	The Picture of Dorian Gray		Albert Lewin	United States
Tarun Majumdar
1971	The invitation	Nimantran	Tarun Majumdar	India
1978	The People	Ganadevata	Tarun Majumdar	India
1976	Child Bride	Balika Badhu	Tarun Majumdar	India

==== Unheard India: Rare Language Films ====
English title	Original title	Language	Director(s)
TUSU		Kurmali	Biswait Roy
Dhairya		Byari	Aditya R Chiranjeevi
Lotus Blooms		Maithili	Pratik Sharma
Tortoise Under The Earth	Dharti Latar Re Horo	Santhali	Shishir Jha
Mansai-Beyond River		Rajbanshi	Ashutosh Das
The Monk And The Courtesan	Bhagavadajjukam	Sanskrit	Yadu Vijayakrishnan
Darling	Nasimay	Rabha	Hiren Bora

== Winners ==
- Golden Royal Bengal Tiger Award for Best Film:
  - Upon Entry
  - The Golden Wings of Watercocks
- Golden Royal Bengal Tiger Award for Best Director: Ernesto Ardito, Virna Molina for Hitler's Witch
- Golden Royal Bengal Tiger Award for Best Short: I Am, Mehmood by Prataya Saha
- Golden Royal Bengal Tiger Award for Best Documentary: Nybreum - The Unsettled Shade by Neha Sharma
- Special Jury mention (Innovation in Moving Pictures): Silent Glory by Nahid Hassanzadeh
- Hiralal Sen Memorial Award Best Film (Indian language's films) : Muthayya by Bhaskhar Maurya
- Hiralal Sen Memorial Award Best Director (Indian language's films) : Deepankar Prakash for Naanera
- Special Jury mention (Indian language's films):
  - The Terrace by Indrani
  - If Only Trees Could Talk by Dr. Bobby Sarma Baruah
- NETPAC Award for Best Film : Fortune by Muhiddin Muzaffar
- Special Jury mention (Indian Short Films):
  - Void by Nabapan Deka
  - The Divine Touch by Dr. Prosenjit Choudhury
