= Lallasi Pal =

- Official poster
- Directed by: Mayanglangbam Raghumani (Eepu)
- Written by: Moirangthem Inao
- Produced by: Homen Rajkumar
- Starring: Lairenjam Olen; Manda Leima
- Cinematography: O. Sanou
- Edited by: Henry Salam
- Music by: Dr. H. Naba; R. K. Jiten; Subhash; Background music: Pee
- Production company: Treasure Island Films
- Distributed by: Cheeng-Tam Film
- Release date: 2002
- Country: India
- Language: Meiteilon (Manipuri)
- Budget: ₹1 lakh

Lallasi Pal (transl. Let's Outstep The Obstacle) is a 2002 Manipuri film directed by Mayanglangbam Raghumani (Eepu) and starring Lairenjam Olen and Manda Leima. The film released in Friends Talkies theatre, Imphal in 2002 and was a blockbuster.

This film was important in marking the transition from celluloid to digital films for Manipuri cinema after Lammei (2002). This film was a breakthrough for Olen and Manda.

== Cast ==
- Lairenjam Olen as Tompok
- Manda Leima as Leihao
- Tayenjam Mema
- Samjetsabam Mangoljao as Ibohal
- Benu
- Bimola as Kaboklei
- Brajalal as Brojen
- Memcha
- Nandababu
- London
- Master Bungnao
- Baby R.K. Nirupama as Bembem
- James as James
- Sophia
- Ahanjao (Guest Artiste)
- Phulka (Guest Artiste)

== Soundtrack ==
Lallasi Pal

Soundtrack album by Dr. H. Naba, R. K. Jiten and Subhash
- Released: 2002
- Genre: Feature film soundtrack

No.	Title	Music	Singer(s)	Length
1.	"Thabal Epom"	Dr. H. Naba
2.	"Nangi Maithong"	Dr. H. Naba
3.	"Ahing Khuding"	R. K. Jithen	Sarita Gazmer
4.	"Ngaikhoghaba Channaba"	Subhash

== Reception ==
Writing for Sangai Express, Akoijam opined that this was one of the films in which Olen "gave a measured and convinincing performance". The writer added that Manda "gave a life time performance in the film Lallasi Pal, a run for her money. Manda’s performance in the said film is an exemplar of how one enters under the skin of the character. Indeed, Manda is not Manda but Leihao in Lalasi Pal".

== Accolades ==
Olen won the award for Best Actor - Male at the Festival of Manipur Cinema in 2007.
