= Kura Pokkhir Shunne Ura =

2022 Bangladeshi film

The Golden Wings of Watercocks
- Poster
- Bengali: কুড়া পক্ষীর শূন্যে উড়া
- Directed by: Muhammad Quayum
- Written by: Muhammad Quayum
- Screenplay by: Muhammad Quayum
- Produced by: Muhammad Quayum
- Starring: Jayita Mahalanbish; Ujjal Kabir Himu
- Cinematography: Mazharul Raju
- Edited by: Arghyakamal Mitra
- Music by: Sukant Majumder; Satyaki Banerjee
- Distributed by: Dhrupadi Chitralok; Continental Entertainment
- Release date: 4 November 2022 (Bangladesh)
- Running time: 117 minutes
- Country: Bangladesh
- Language: Bengali

Kura Pokkhir Shunne Ura is a 2022 Bangladeshi art film produced, written, and directed by Muhammad Quayum. The film features Jayita Mahalanbish and Ujjal Kabir Himu in lead roles.

The film was invited to the 28th Kolkata International Film Festival in the 'International Competition: Innovation in Moving Images' section. It was screened on 16 December 2022, and won the Golden Royal Bengal Tiger Award for Best Film jointly with a Spanish film, Upon Entry.

== Cast ==
- Jayita Mahalanbish
- Ujjal Kabir Himu
- Samia Akhtar Bristy
- Sumi Islam
- Badal Shahid
- Mahmud Alam
- Abul Kalam Azad
- Farzina Aktar

== Production ==
Muhammad Quayum, the film's director, had planned to produce the film around the 2000s. But he did not get any producer to finance the film. That is why he has to wait for many years. Its pre-production began in 2017. The film was filmed in the Sunamganj district which is known as the largest Haor region in Bangladesh. It was filmed for 3 years from 2019. Actors who acted in the film are not professionals but work in theatres. One song each by Hemanga Biswas and Radharaman Dutta has been used in this film.

== Release ==
It premiered on 29 October 2022. However, as no movie theaters in Bangladesh were interested in showing the film, its release became uncertain. Later, on the director's request, Star Cineplex agreed to screen the film twice a day from 4 to 10 November. Later it was also screened at CineScope in Narayanganj and Sugandha movie theaters in Chittagong. It was screened at the Kolkata International Film Festival on 16 December, 2022. Continental Entertainment has decided to release the film internationally.

== Reception ==
=== Critical response ===
On October 29, film critic Bidhan Biberu wrote on Facebook, "The Golden Wings of Watercocks will be a document of the topography, climate, cultivation, myths, rituals, and people's lifestyle of the Haor region of Bangladesh. The film could have gone to another height if it had been a documentary instead of a feature film".

According to Saikat Dey of The Business Standard, the film's director did not compromise on story to convey its core artistic characteristics. The film highlights the life, traditions and culture of the Haor region people.

In a review published on the website of Channel i, Shafiq Sai praised the film's story and wrote that the lack of use of lights and colors made the scenes come alive. He felt that the actors acted so well here that it was not even felt that they were acting. But he also felt that in some cases the characters could not maintain fluency in dialogue delivery.

Bratya Raisu wrote on Facebook that the director did not portray the characters in the story from a middle-class perspective.

Monira Sharmin of The Daily Star praised the film's cinematography but felt that there was nothing new about its cinematography. According to her, its story is written against the commercial trend. She found similarities between the film and Pather Panchali.

Ahsan Kabir of Bangla Tribune wrote, "The biggest aspect of this film is the intimacy of life. It can be said that no other film in this country has done such a large canvas painting. Everything in life in Haor is there in the film, like water, seasons, storms, water mourning, dam breaking, and wedding joy. It will remain a landmark film in Bangladesh due to its depiction of poverty and the uncertainty of life".

=== Accolades ===
List of awards and nominations
Organization	Year	Category	Recipients & nominees	Result	Ref.(s)
Kolkata International Film Festival	2022	Golden Royal Bengal Tiger Award for Best Film	Muhammad Quayum	Won	

== Sequel ==
Muhammad Quayum plans to produce a sequel to the film which is scheduled to begin filming in 2023.
