= Guwahati Central Jail =

Prison centre in Assam, India

- Interactive map of Guwahati Central Jail
- Location: Guwahati, Assam; 26.108032°N 91.756340°E
- Status: Operating
- Security class: Maximum
- Capacity: 1000
- Population: 1284 (15 May 2018)
- Opened: 1881; 145 years ago
- Managed by: Assam Prisons
- Website: prisons.assam.gov.in

Guwahati Central Jail is a prison located at the center of Guwahati city in Assam, India. It is one of 31 prisons located in the state of Assam. Spread over 28 acres (0.11 km^{2}) including 11 acres (0.045 km^{2}) of the actual jail area, it was constructed with a capacity for 900 male inmates and 100 female inmates, for a total of 1000 inmates.

== History ==
The first jail in Guwahati was set up in 1881 at Fancy Bazaar with a capacity of 500 inmates. It was moved to Sarusajai on 30 April 2010 and was upgraded to the present capacity of 1000 inmates. The new jail was opened in April 2012 when 805 inmates were moved there. The district jail is located in the heart of Guwahati City.

== Hunger Strike ==
On 29 June 2020, when peasant leader Akhil Gogoi, founder of Krishak Mukti Sangram Samiti (KMSS) organisation completed a jail term of 200 days, 1200 inmates at the Central Jail declared a hunger strike, demanding the release of Gogoi and presenting COVID-19 related pleas to the authorities.

== Notable prisoners ==
1. Rajkumar Meghen, chief of Manipur-based United National Liberation Front (UNLF) was arrested by Assam the police and kept in Guwahati Central Jail. He was first reportedly kidnapped by Bangladeshi agents on 29 September 2010, and after that was arrested by the Assam police and charged by the National Investigating Agency. He was released on 9 November 2019 as his 10-year jail sentence was reduced because of his contributions to the jail, such as setting up a music school, a library for the inmates, and constructing a rock garden inside the Guwahati Central Jail premises.
2. Sharjeel Imam, an activist, arrested on 28 January 2020 by Delhi Police, whom was alleged that his speech promoted enmity among people that led riots in Jamia Millia Islamia University.
