= Lakhipurgi Lakhipyari =

- Poster
- Directed by: L. Surjakanta
- Screenplay by: Somen Moirangcha
- Story by: Ashok Nongthombam
- Produced by: Somen Moirangcha
- Starring: Lairenjam Olen; Devita Urikhinbam
- Cinematography: L. Surjakanta
- Edited by: Tommy
- Music by: Samu (Roubi)
- Production company: Ebudhou Film Creations
- Distributed by: Ebudhou Film Creations
- Release date: 2006
- Running time: 161 minutes
- Country: India
- Language: Meiteilon (Manipuri)

Lakhipurgi Lakhipyari is a 2006 Manipuri film directed by L. Surjakanta and produced by Somen Moirangcha, under the banner of Ebudhou Film Creations. The film features Lairenjam Olen and Devita Urikhinbam in the lead roles. The film is based on the eponymous novel by Ashok Khurai, who died during the shooting of the film due to heart attack in 2006.

Lakhipurgi Lakhipyari got official selection at the First Festival of Manipuri Cinema 2007, held in January 2008.

== Plot ==
A betrayed woman Thambal takes revenge by killing her husband, which separates herself and her son Amar. Amar grows up under the kind care of an old man at Lakhipur. He falls in love with a local beautiful girl Lakhipyari. As love blossoms, a letter from Imphal interludes to make Amar leaving Lakhipyari. Lakhipyari can't help but to wait for Amar's return.

== Cast ==
- Lairenjam Olen as Amar
- Devita Urikhinbam as Lakhipyari
- Huirem Seema as Thambal, Amar's mother
- Loitongbam Dorendra as Amar's grandfather
- Takhellambam Lokendra as Lakhipyari's father
- R.K. Hemabati as Lakhipyari's mother
- Laimayum Bolex as Amar (Child)
- Priyaluxmi
- Keshoram
- Purnendu
- R.K. Amarjeet (Special Appearance)

== Accolades ==
It won 11 awards at the First Festival of Manipuri Cinema 2007, including Best Feature Film and Best Director Award, won by L. Surjakanta.

- Best Feature Film (Somen Moirangcha & L. Surjakanta)
- Best Director (L. Surjakanta)
- Best Actress (Devita Urikhinbam)
- Best Supporting Actress (Huirem Seema)
- Best Screenplay (Somen Moirangcha)
- Best Story (Ashok Khurai)
- Best Child Artist (Master Bolex)

== Soundtrack ==
Samu (Roubi) composed the soundtrack for the movie and Roshan Sorokhaibam wrote the lyrics.

No.	Title	Lyrics	Music	Singer(s)	Length
1.	"Sakhenbi Nanggi"	Roshan Sorokkhaibam	Samu (Roubi)	Hamom Sadananda	04:55
2.	"Tanourabi Nanggi Naappada"	Roshan Sorokkhaibam	Samu (Roubi)	Hamom Sadananda, Maibam Roshibina	05:52
3.	"Yengjage Eina Thamoi Penna"	Roshan Sorokkhaibam	Samu (Roubi)	Huidrom Nowboy, Kabita	07:10
4.	"Naitom Paiba Cheklani"	Roshan Sorokkhaibam	Samu (Roubi)	Huidrom Nowboy	05:07
5.	"Thamoibu Kaihallaga"	Roshan Sorokkhaibam	Samu (Roubi)	Pushparani Huidrom	05:05
6.	"Nungshibi Nanggi Shaktamsibu"	Roshan Sorokkhaibam	Samu (Roubi)	Ranbir Thouna	05:40
Total length:					33:49
