= Thoicha =

- Theatrical release poster
- Directed by: Ningthoujam Prem
- Screenplay by: Jeetendra Ningomba
- Story by: Jeetendra Ningomba
- Produced by: Ningthoujam Prem
- Starring: Leishangthem Tonthoingambi Devi; Hamom Sadananda
- Cinematography: L. Rajesh
- Edited by: Rakesh Moirangthem
- Music by: Ningthoujam Prem; Jeetendra Ningomba
- Production companies: Premier Pictures; Mosbran Films
- Distributed by: Mosbran Films
- Release date: 2010
- Running time: 122 minutes
- Country: India
- Language: Meiteilon (Manipuri)

Thoicha is a 2010 dark fantasy Manipuri film produced and directed by Ningthoujam Prem. The film features Leishangthem Tonthoingambi Devi as the titular protagonist and Hamom Sadananda in the lead roles. Its second and third installments Thoicha 2 and Thoicha 3 were released in 2013 and 2017 respectively.

== Cast ==
- Leishangthem Tonthoingambi Devi as Thoicha
- Hamom Sadananda as Ibohal
- Laishram Lalitabi as Thoicha's mother
- Rina Yengkhom as Thoicha's friend
- Wangkhem Lalitkumar as Village Head
- Nganthoi
- Henary Sarangthem
- Loveboy
