= Eewai =

Eewai: The Ripple
- Poster
- Directed by: Kh. Bishwamittra
- Screenplay by: Kh. Bishwamittra
- Story by: Rebika Okram
- Produced by: Samir Thingbaijam
- Starring: Leishangthem Tonthoi
- Cinematography: Romen
- Edited by: Mohendro (KAMS)
- Music by: Michael Ngangom
- Production company: Nongdol Mamikol
- Release date: 26 June 2022
- Running time: 23 minutes
- Country: India
- Language: Meiteilon (Manipuri)

Eewai (English: The Ripple) is a 2022 Manipuri short film directed by Khwairakpam Bishwamittra. It is produced by Samir Thingbaijam under the banner of Nongdol Mamikol. The film stars Leishangthem Tonthoi in the lead role. It was premiered at Manipur State Film Development Society (MSFDS), Imphal on 26 June 2022. The film got official selections at the 4th Nepal Cultural International Film Festival 2022, Druk International Film Festival 2022 (Bhutan), Festivus Film Fest -Canada 2022, Dadashaheb Phalke International Film Festival- India 2023 and Gangtok International Film Festival 2022.

Eewai was screened at the 28th Kolkata International Film Festival 2022 in Short and Documentary Panorama section. The film was certified by Central Board of Film Certification (CBFC) in 2022.

== Synopsis ==
The film tells the agony of a mom whose little child dies premature. Within the Meitei community of Manipur, a baby who dies earlier than he attains the age of three years is taken into account a nasty omen to the household and all customary post-mortal ceremonies are deprived. However, for a mom, her child shall all the time be her little one without contemplating the age.

== Cast ==
- Leishangthem Tonthoi as Henba's mother
- Henary Sarangthem as Henba's father
- Kshetrimayum Rashi as Henba's grandmother
- Suniti
- Khoibam Homeshwori
- Chandrakala
- Nandini
- Naobi
- Baby Kelvish Salam as Henba
- Gurumayum Ananta Sharma as Doctor
- Nganthoi

== Accolades ==
The film won several awards in different categories at several international film festivals held in India and abroad.

Award	Category	Winner's Name	Ref.
11th Delhi Shorts International Film Festival 2022	Honorable Jury Mention		
International Cultural Artifact Film Festival 2022	Semi Finalist	Khwairakpam Bishwamittra	
1st Northeast India International Film Festival 2022	Best Experimental Film	Khwairakpam Bishwamittra	
Goa International Film Competition 2022	Best Actress	Leishangthem Tonthoingambi Devi	
Chennai Short Film Festival 2022	Semi-Finalist	Samir Thingbaijam	
Global Independent Film Festival of India 2022	1st Best Actor - Female	Leishangthem Tonthoingambi Devi	
Global Independent Film Festival of India 2022	3rd Best Director	Khwairakpam Bishwamittra	
3rd Jammu Film Festival 2023	Best Actress	Leishangthem Tonthoingambi Devi	
NIRI 9-2nd International Film Festival 2023	Best Actress	Leishangthem Tonthoingambi Devi	
17th Ayodhya Film Festival 2023	Best Story	Rebika Okram	
16th International Film Festivals 2023, Jaipur	3rd Best Short Fiction Film	Khwairakpam Bishwamittra	
15th Manipur State Film Awards 2023	Best Short Film	Samir Thingbaijam (Producer); Khwairakpam Bishwamittra (Director)	
15th Manipur State Film Awards 2023	Best Director (Non-Feature)	Khwairakpam Bishwamittra	
15th Manipur State Film Awards 2023	Best Music Director (Non-Feature)	Michael Ngangom	

== Official Selection in Film Festivals ==
- Nepal Cultural International Film Festival 2022
- North East India International Film Festival 2022
- International Kolkata Short Film Festival 2022
- SVCAPlex 1st International Short Film Festival 2022
- Pune Shorts International Film Festival 2022
- NEXGN International Short Film Festival 2022
- International Cultural Artifact Film Festival 2022
- Druk International Film Festival 2022
- Gangtok International Film Festival 2022
- 11th Delhi Shorts International Film Festival 2022
- Global Independent Film Festival of India 2022
- 11th Mumbai Shorts International Film Festival 2022
- Jaisalmer International Film Festival 2022
- Kollywood International Film Festival 2022
- Festivus Film Fest, Canada 2022
- 28th Kolkata International Film Festival (KIFF) 2022 Short and Documentary Panorama
- Kalakari Film Awards - Indore, Madhya Pradesh, 2023
- Patliputra International Film Festival 2023
- Chennai National Short Film Festival 2023
- 3rd Jammu Film Festival 2023
- NIRI 9-2nd International Film Festival 2023
- Global Bengaluru International Film Festival 2023
- 4th Jharkhand National Film Festival 2023
- 9th International Film Festival of Shimla 2023
- 3rd Kerala Short Film Festival 2023
- 11th Darbhanga International Film Festival 2023
- Maharashtra International Film Festival 2023
- New Jersey Indian International Film Festival 2023
- Himachal Short Film Festival 2023
- Vindhya International Film Festival 2024, Madhya Pradesh
