= Taibang Keithel =

2018 Manipuri film

- Theatrical release poster
- Directed by: Satyajit BK
- Written by: Satyajit BK
- Produced by: Miltan Langonjam
- Starring: Khwairakpam Bishwamittra
- Cinematography: Sanjoy Ch.
- Edited by: Tom Maisnam
- Music by: Tenao HD; Sound Design: Tom Maisnam; Tenao HD
- Production company: Soraren Films
- Distributed by: Soraren Films
- Release date: 9 September 2018
- Running time: 94 minutes
- Country: India
- Language: Meiteilon (Manipuri)

Taibang Keithel (English: Living Market) is a 2018 comedy Manipuri film written and directed by Satyajit BK and produced by Miltan Langonjam, under the banner of Soraren Films. It stars Khwairakpam Bishwamittra in the lead role. The movie was premiered at Manipur State Film Development Society (MSFDS), Palace Compound, on 9 September 2018.

The film was released by Amitra Video in DVD on 4 March 2020.

== Cast ==
- Khwairakpam Bishwamittra as Ahanjao
- Bobo Ningthoukhongjam as Koireng
- Gurumayum Priyogopal as Lukhoi
- Idhou as Achou
- Prem Sharma as Ningthembi
- Ibomcha as Tomei
- Ratan Lai
- Mahanta
- Nunglen Luwang
- Chandrasing
- Bonendro
- Deepak Mutum
- Rajpritam
- Barun

== Accolades ==
Khwairakpam Bishwamittra won the Best Actor in a Leading Role at the 12th Manipur State Film Awards 2019.

Award	Category	Winner's name	Result
12th Manipur State Film Awards 2019	Best Actor in a Leading Role - Male	Khwairakpam Bishwamittra	Won
12th Manipur State Film Awards 2019	Special Jury Mention	Chakpram Rameshchandra (Idhou)	Won
12th Manipur State Film Awards 2019	Best Music Director	Tenao HD	Nominated
8th SSS MANIFA 2019	Best Cinematography	Sanjoy Ch.	Nominated

== Music ==
Tenao HD composed the soundtrack for the film and Satyajit BK wrote the lyrics. The song is titled Taibang Keithel Karakpani.
