= Ngaihak Lambida =

- Poster
- Directed by: Haobam Paban Kumar
- Screenplay by: Haobam Paban Kumar
- Story by: M. K. Binodini Devi
- Produced by: Satyajit Ray Film and Television Institute
- Starring: Huirem Seema; Kangabam Tomba
- Cinematography: Shehnad Jalal
- Edited by: Sankha
- Music by: Ningthouja Lancha; Sound recordist: Prasun Sen Gupta
- Production companies: Satyajit Ray Film and Television Institute
- Release date: 2006
- Running time: 19 minutes
- Country: India
- Language: Meiteilon (Manipuri)

Ngaihak Lambida (English: Along The Way) is a 2006 non-feature Manipuri film directed by Haobam Paban Kumar. It is produced by Satyajit Ray Film and Television Institute. The film was selected in the non-feature section of the Indian Panorama at the 38th International Film Festival of India 2007.

The film participated in the competition section of Short Fiction Films in the Third Eye 6th Asian Film Festival, Mumbai, 2007.

== Cast ==
- Huirem Seema as Manileima
- Kangabam Tomba as Stranger
- Tarkovsky Haobam as Bungo
- R.K. Surchandra as Geet
