= Sanakeithel =

1983 Manipuri film

- Movie Poster
- Directed by: M. A. Singh
- Story by: Nongmaithem Pahari
- Produced by: Thoudam Doren
- Starring: A. Memi; Master Tony
- Cinematography: Sooresh Patel
- Edited by: M. A. Singh
- Music by: Nongmaithem Pahari
- Production company: ATB Films International
- Distributed by: ATB Films International
- Release date: 1983
- Running time: 120 minutes
- Country: India
- Language: Meiteilon (Manipuri)

Sanakeithel (English: Golden Market) is a 1983 Manipuri film directed by Maibam Amuthoi Singh (M. A. Singh) and produced by Thoudam Doren, under the banner of ATB Films International. The movie stars A. Memi and Master Tony in the lead roles. The film won the National Film Award for Best Feature Film in Manipuri at the 31st National Film Awards.

The film was invited to the Singapore International Film Festival, 1984 and screened in Indian Panorama of International Film Festival of India (IFFI), 1984.

== Plot ==
Nungshi, a righteous young widow rears up her only infant son Mobi. Although life is hard, she maintains her pride. On returning home long after a shopping trip, she is way laid and gang raped. The shock and trauma of being criminally assaulted by men in succession have one immediate result. She becomes completely insane and her relation with her son becomes a memory thrown down a fathomless pit. Mobi is taken in by Nungshi's brother and is thoroughly exploited by his wife as a domestic servant. Mobi later became a scape goat for their marital discords and soon fled for the Sanakeithel with a flicker of hope for survival.

At Sanakeithel, he is picked up by Ebai, a psychopathic small time mafia don who introduces him to the rest of his gang of petty thieves. Two incidents in Mobi's foray the meeting with Babu, the tramp, from whom he realizes what a mother means: the meeting with a mad woman who often looks deep into his face trying to recollect something, arouses his yearning for his mother's love. He also starts discovering the various social and economic inequalities that typify contemporary Manipur. A chance encounter in which he hears his uncle trying to talk to the mad woman makes him realises that she is his mother. He starts doubling his efforts to make her happy and win her affection. He eventually saves her from Ebai. Knowing fully well that he will get no replay, he cries out, "Why were you made, mother?"

(MSFDS, 50 Years of Manipuri Cinema, Golden Jubilee Publication)

== Cast ==
- A. Memi as Nungshi
- Master Tony as Mobi
- Somorendra
- Manaobi
- Upen
- Lalit
- Sahnawaz Khan
- Anwardi
- Holkhomang

== Accolades ==
Sanakeithel won the National Film Award for Best Feature Film in Manipuri at the 31st National Film Awards. The citation for the National Award reads, "For the sympathetic portrayal of a human relationship in the context of a social tragedy".

Award	Category	Winner's name	Result
31st National Film Awards	Best Feature Film in Manipuri	Thoudam Doren (Producer); M.A. Singh (Director)	Won
1st Manipur State Film Awards 1984	Best Director	M.A. Singh	Won
1st Manipur State Film Awards 1984	Best Editor	M.A. Singh	Won
