= Iche Tampha =

- Poster
- Directed by: Bijgupta Laishram
- Screenplay by: Bijgupta Laishram
- Story by: Bijgupta Laishram
- Produced by: Kh. Nipen
- Starring: Gokul Athokpam; Tonthoi Leishangthem; Redy Yumnam
- Cinematography: Surjit BB
- Edited by: Surjit BB
- Music by: Sorri Senjam
- Production company: Chin Films
- Distributed by: Chin Films
- Release date: 5 March 2017
- Running time: 139 minutes
- Country: India
- Language: Meiteilon (Manipuri)

Iche Tampha (English: Sister Tampha) is a 2017 Manipuri film directed by Bijgupta Laishram and produced by Kh. Nipen. It stars Tonthoi Leishangthem as the titular protagonist, with Gokul Athokpam, Bala Hijam and Redy Yumnam in the lead roles. The film was released at MSFDS, Palace Compound on 5 March 2017.

== Plot ==
The story revolves around a lady Tampha who is continuously harassed by her step-mother. Her father is totally against his step-wife's nature. Tampha is in a relationship with Leimahan's son, but Leimahan doesn't want Tampha to be her daughter-in-law. Tampha shares a very strong bond with her brother Sanathoi, her step-mother's son. Santhoi's mother send him to Delhi for further studies. Meanwhile, despite Leimahan's wishes, her son learned that Tampha is pregnant, so they decide to elope. On the same day, they meet with an accident where Leimahan's son is severely injured and is hospitalised. Leimahan comes to Tampha's place and warns Tampha's step-mother to not let Tampha try to meet his son and forget about him. During this time, Tampha's step-mother plans for Tampha's marriage to a Meitei man living in Assam, who recently got divorced from his first wife.

Tampha's step-mother also learns about Tampha's pregnancy and repeatedly asks her to abort the child before marriage, but Tampha refuses to. She tries meeting Leimahan's son but was not allowed. She writes a message to Leimahan's son informing him about what all is happening, but he happens to read the message only when he was discharged from the hospital. At that time, Tampha is already married to the guy in Assam. In no time, the guy and his sister learn of Tampha's pregnancy, and starts treating her like a servant. As soon as Tampha give birth to a baby boy, she is thrown out of the house. In Manipur, at this time, Tampha's father died. Since then, Tampha starts working in random places in Assam, joins as worker in housebuilding and stays at a place where the other female Assamese workers are staying, with her child.

One night, after coming back from work, some Assamese men try to kidnap her, to which she fights and run, finding shelter in a stranger's house. The stranger also tries to rape her, to which she runs out of the place and ends up sleeping under a tree, near some railway track. Next morning, she returns to the place where she was staying. One woman there suggests her to transform herself to look ugly, so that guys won't get attracted. She then starts taking up odd jobs, like selling burnt maizes in footpaths and collecting money from passengers by cleaning floors of trains. She finds life very hard to survive, so decides to leave Assam and go back to Manipur.

The film then shows Tampha's brother Sanathoi grown-up fully and returning from Delhi after completing his studies. He is not maintaining healthy relationship with his mother, after he learns about his sister's disappearance after she got married and also filed a case against the guy from Assam and his sister. He is also in a relationship with Thadoi at that time. He gives MPSC civil services examination, to which he successfully cleared and becomes an MCS officer. Leimahan's son doesn't get married at all, longing for Tampha and in the hope that Tampha will return and come back to him one day. Tampha is settled at this time in a village of Manipur, where she stays with his son at some old guy's house. Apparently, the old guy plans to sell his house and live at his married daughter's place since he is getting old and has no one to take care of him. So, Tampha and her son move to Imphal.

After becoming MCS officer, Sanathoi and his mother leave their home and move to the quarter given by the government. One day, they happen to face water shortage problem in the quarter. So, Sanathoi's mother decides to call the lady who supplies water through her neighbour. The lady comes to supply water, which happens to be Tampha. Tampha, as soon as she recognises that the lady ordering water is her step-mother, runs away leaving everything. Sanathoi and his mother, after realizing that the lady is Tampha, chase her and ask her to forgive for whatever Sanathoi's mother has done. She is taken to their quarter. Sanathoi calls Leimahan's son and informs about Tampha. The film ends with Leimahan's son taking Tampha and their son home.

== Cast ==
- Tonthoi Leishangthem as Tampha
- Gokul Athokpam as Leimahan's son
- Bala Hijam as Thadoi
- Redy Yumnam as Sanathoi
- Sagolsem Dhanamanjuri as Tampha's step-mother, Sanathoi's mother
- Ghanashyam as Tampha's & Sanathoi's father
- R.K. Hemabati as Leimahan
- SP Ingocha Yanglem as Thadoi's Brother
- Neera Urikhinbam as Thadoi's sister-in-law
- Samjetsabam Mangoljao as Tampha's married husband

== Accolades ==
Tonthoi Leishangthem won the Best Actress Award at the Prag Cine Awards - North East 2018 for her performance in the film. Tonthoi also won Special Jury Award at the 11th Manipuri State Film Awards 2018.

== Soundtrack ==
Sorri Senjam composed the soundtrack for the film and Thingbaijam Swarankumar wrote the lyrics. The song is titled Nungshi Sambal. It is choreographed by Menaka.

No.	Title	Lyrics	Music	Singer(s)	Length
1.	"Nungshi Sambal"	Thingbaijam Swarankumar	Sorri Senjam	Sorri Senjam & Chitra Pangambam	05:55
Total length:					5:55
