= Lanphamda Ibeni =

- Poster
- Directed by: Romi Meitei
- Screenplay by: Y. Kumarjit
- Story by: Kunjalal Yendrembam
- Produced by: Bandana Maisnam
- Starring: Manda Leima; Hamom Sadananda
- Cinematography: Radhamohon
- Edited by: Dinesh Nong & Johni
- Music by: Sorri Senjam
- Production company: Bandana Films
- Distributed by: Bandana Films
- Release date: 4 December 2011
- Running time: 139 minutes
- Country: India
- Language: Meiteilon (Manipuri)

Lanphamda Ibeni (English: Ibeni in Warfield) is a 2011 Manipuri film directed by Romi Meitei and produced by Bandana Maisnam under the banner of Bandana Films. It stars Manda Leima and Hamom Sadananda in the lead roles. The film was premiered at Bhagyachandra Open Air Theatre (BOAT) on 4 December 2011. It was theatrically released at Friends' Talkies and many other cinema halls of Manipur in 2012. Lanphamda Ibeni is based on Kunjalal Yendrembam's radio play of the same title.

The film got selection at the 8th Manipur State Film Festival 2013.

== Plot ==
The film tells the story of Ibeni, an ill-fated lady. She fights for survival but uses illegal means. She involves herself in drug business, steals gold and other precious jewelleries from various people and runs away. All the money and stuffs she stole are used for her children's education and welfare. At a time when her daughter completes the MBBS course and her son tops board exam, she gets caught by a police team during her last consignment related to drugs. This time, she does not run away but accepts her wrongdoings.

== Cast ==
- Manda Leima as Ibeni
- Hamom Sadananda as Loya, Ibeni's husband
- Raju Nong as High Court Judge
- Huirem Seema as Judge's wife
- Gurumayum Priyogopal as Modhu, Ibeni's father
- Bimola as Ibeni's mother
- Shoibam Italy as Police officer
- Heisnam Geeta
- Bala Hijam (Cameo appearance)
- Gokul Athokpam (Cameo appearance)

== Soundtrack ==
Sorri Senjam composed the soundtrack for the film. There are two songs in the movie. The songs are titled Maibemma (opening song) and Hangla Atiyada.

No.	Title	Lyrics	Music	Singer(s)	Length
1.	"Maibemma"	N/A	Sorri Senjam	N/A	04:32
2.	"Hangla Atiyada"	Romi Meitei	Sorri Senjam	Sorri Senjam, Mandakini Takhellambam	06:24
Total length:					10:56
