= Sanarik =

- Theatrical release poster
- Directed by: L. Rajesh
- Written by: Raz Zes Khuraijam
- Screenplay by: Y. Kumarjit
- Produced by: Khelen Mangang
- Starring: Baby Rekha Heigrujam
- Cinematography: L. Rajesh
- Edited by: Rakesh Moirangthem
- Music by: H. Khelen (Pee)
- Production company: Mosbran Films
- Distributed by: Mosbran Films
- Release date: 28 January 2014
- Running time: 113 minutes
- Country: India
- Language: Meiteilon (Manipuri)

Sanarik is a 2014 Manipuri horror film directed by L. Rajesh and produced by Khelen Mangang, under the banner of Mosbran Films. The film features baby Rekha Heigrujam in the title role with Lairenjam Olen, Nirmala, Idhou, Mangoljao, Merina, Thoibi and Sagolsem Dhanamanjuri in the lead roles. It is a feature film about an abnormal girl who is being harassed because of her looks and colour. The film was released at Manipur Film Development Corporation (MFDC), Palace Compound on 28 January 2014.

== Cast ==
- Baby Rekha Heigrujam as Sanarik
- Lairenjam Olen as Doren, School Principal
- Idhou as Tharosangbi's husband
- Sagolsem Dhanamanjuri as Tharosangbi
- Samjetsabam Mangoljao
- Khun Surchandra
- Merina
- Laimayum Nirmala

== Accolades ==
Baby Rekha Heigrujam got the Best Child Artist Award in 4th SSS MANIFA 2015.

== Soundtrack ==
H. Khelen (Pee) composed the soundtrack for the film and Huidrom Noren wrote the lyrics. The song is titled Nongdam Thina Poklaklabi Eini.

Sanarik

Soundtrack album by Salam Panchashini
- Genre: Feature film soundtrack
- Length: 2:15
- Label: Mosbran Films

No.	Title	Lyrics	Music	Singer(s)	Length
1.	"Nongdam Thina Poklaklabi Eini"	Huidrom Noren	H. Khelen (Pee)	Salam Panchashini	02:15
Total length:					2:15
