= Arambam Somorendra =

Founder of UNLF

Tamohal Arambam Somorendra
- Born: 12 July 1935; Sagolband Meino Leirak
- Died: 10 June 2000 (aged 64)
- Education: M.A
- Occupation: Founder of UNLF
- Organization: UNLF
- Spouse: Arambam Ongbi Memchoubi
- Father: Arambam Dorendrajit

Arambam Somorendra (12 July 1935 - 10 June 2000), also known as Arambam Samarendra, was a writer dramatist and socialist. He formed the Amateur Artist Association in 1956. He is also one of the founding member of "Pan-Manipuri Youth League" which was an active youth organization for unifying the Manipuris in Manipur, Cachar, Myanmar and Bangladesh. He along with some followers of Hijam Irabot and some tribal activist formed the United National Liberation Front in 1964. He worked as Chairman of UNLF until 1975.
