= United National Liberation Front =

Meitei insurgent group in Manipur, India

United National Liberation Front of Manipur
- Banner of the United National Liberation Front
- Abbreviation: UNLF
- Founded: 24 November 1964; 61 years ago
- Founder: Arambam Somorendra
- Type: Far-left politico-military rebel group
- Legal status: Banned by the Government of India
- Purpose: To reestablish Manipur as a sovereign socialist state
- Headquarters: Manipur
- Members: 2,000 armed cadres (2005) 10,000 Armed cadres (2023)
- Chairperson: Arambam Somorendra † (1964-2000); RK Meghen (2000-2010); Lanjingba Khundongbam (2010-2023)
- Main organ: Ningtam Meira (journal)

The United National Liberation Front (UNLF), also known as the United National Liberation Front of Manipur, is a separatist Meitei insurgent group active in the state of Manipur in Northeast India which aims to establish a sovereign and socialist Manipur.

== Background ==
The UNLF's movement manifested as a result of several similar movements of the same political agenda. The outfit was founded on 24 November 1964 with the following key personalities as its central committee members:

1. RK Meghen (Sana Yaima), Chairman
2. Kalalung Kamei, President
3. Thankhopao Singsit, Vice-President
4. Arambam Somorendra, General Secretary
5. Longjam Manimohan, Member
6. Laishram Kanhai, Member
7. Nongmeikapam Sanajaoba, Member
8. Nongmaithem Pahari, Member

== Ideology and Aim ==
UNLF have nothing to demand from the Government of India but instead it is fighting to regain the lost sovereignty [of Manipur].

— UNLF

India's National Investigation Agency (NIA) in September 2012 acknowledged that "the activities carried out by the United National Liberation Front (UNLF) are for bringing sovereignty in the state of Manipur." The UNLF has viewed the statement as "a big political victory."

The UNLF chairperson, Rajkumar Meghan (Sana Yaima) has been charged for "waging war" against India by the National Investigation Agency (NIA), but the UNLF leader has voiced that the UNLF does not view India or its army as enemies, and "the UNLF only resist the Indian armed forces stationed in Manipur and to resist those people who engaged in colonial repression."

Sana Yaima believes that Manipur is "under martial law," and has questioned the character and worthiness of the elections that had been held in Manipur. He further believes that "the most democratic means to resolve conflict is plebiscite."

== Organization ==
Manipur People's Army
- Flag of the Manipur People's Army
- Dates active: 24 November 1964 – present (armed since 1990)
- Headquarters: Manipur
- Active regions: Northeast India
- Ideology: Manipuri Nationalism; Socialism; Separatism
- Wars: Insurgency in Northeast India Insurgency in Manipur 2023-2025 Manipur violence

The UNLF is one of the oldest insurgent organizations in Northeast India. E. N. Rammohan, the former Director-General of the Border Security Force, once wrote, "Of the five major (Imphal) valley underground groups, the UNLF's ideology is by and large intact. The senior leadership is well educated and has good organizational control."

=== Manipur People's Army ===
Manipur People's Army (MPA) was formed on 9 February 1987 as an Army Wing of UNLF. In 1991, the UNLF picked up arms, and its first armed action against Indian security forces was carried out on 15 December 1991 at Lamdan on a convoy of the Central Reserve Police Force (CRPF). In 2005, the MPA's strength was estimated to be about 2,000 armed cadres. According to the UNLF, by 2005, the UNLF was engaged in a battle against about 50,000 armed personnel from the Indian Army deployed against the organisation in the forest regions of Manipur. The cadres of the group are drawn largely from the Meitei and the Pangal people.

=== Factions ===
In 2020, UNLF split into two factions, one led by R.K. Achou Singh alias "Koireng" and the other led by Khundongbam Pambei, called UNLF (Koireng) and UNLF (Pambei) respectively. The Koireng faction was said to have had 300 cadres and the Pambei faction 2000 caders.

== Strategy and Tactics ==
The UNLF is known to be heavily involved with Extortion, Arms Trading, and Income Generating Projects to finance their armed movements. They have several organized training camps within the northeast sector of India and the neighboring countries of Myanmar and Bangladesh. Ningtam Meira is the primary media outlet they use to make publications.

=== Four–point proposal to Indian government ===
The UNLF had put forward four condiciones sine quibus non before the government of India if it is willing to initiate dialogue and ink a peace accord with the organisation, which are:

1. "A plebiscite under UN supervision to elicit the people's opinion on the core issue of restoration of Manipur's independence."
2. "Deployment of a UN peacekeeping force in Manipur to ensure free and fair process."
3. "Surrender of arms by the UNLF to the UN force, matched by the withdrawal of Indian troops."
4. "Handing over of political power by the UN in accordance with the results of the plebiscite."

== Arrest of chairperson ==
On 4 December 2010, Sanayaima was produced by the NIA, who claimed to have arrested Sanayaima from Motihari in Bihar; while, Sanayaima has proclaimed that he was abducted by the Bangladeshi agencies on 29 September 2010 and "handed over" to the agencies of India. Sanayaima has been booked by the NIA for "waging war against the Indian Union under section 120 (B) IPC, 121, 121 (A), 122 IPC and 16, 17, 18, 18 (A), 18 (B) & 20 Unlawful Activities Prevention Act, 1967 as amended in 2008." After the arrest, he said that "in a multi-community region, the idea of peace cannot be achieved without considering the collateral damages of the secondary conflict that emerges out of the meaningless peace process."

The Indian government ploy in the so called peace process in 'Western South East Asia' (WESIA) [Indian northeast region] is aimed at transforming the conflict between the peoples of the region with the government of India into a conflict between the peoples on ethnic lines.

— Sanayaima, in 2012

Drawing inspiration from the "charged political atmosphere" during the "Naxalbari uprising", he had dropped out of the higher studies at the Jadavpur University in Kolkata, and "picked up a gun and vanished into the forest" about 4 decades ago; and had remained underground since then.

== Controversies ==
Civil rights activist Babloo Loitongbom, said that "there was an allegation that certain members of the UNLF had raped 20 women. We formed a multi-ethnic fact finding team to go to the place. Unfortunately, we were not allowed to go inside the camp, we were not given any medical evidence."

== Peace Talks ==
On 29 November 2023, the Pambei faction of UNLF signed a ceasefire agreement with the Government of India. The agreement was claimed as being "historic" as the UNLF is the first Meitei insurgent organization to sign such an agreement.

== See also ==
- Armed Forces (Special Powers) Act
- Insurgency in Northeast India
- Insurgency in Manipur
- 2023 Manipur violence
- List of terrorist organisations in India
