= Pranjal Saikia =

Indian actor

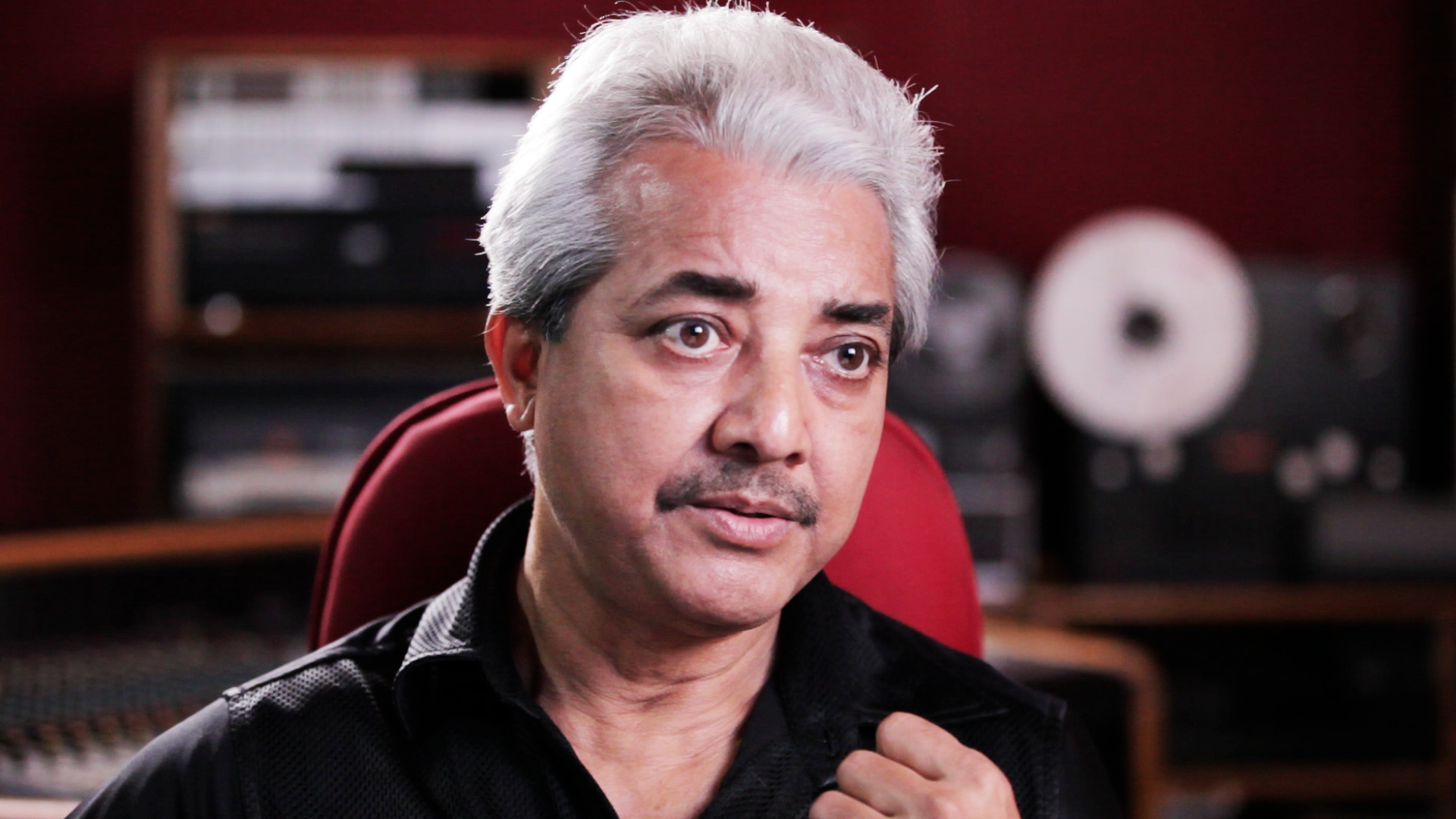
Actor Pranjal Saikia gives a behind-the-scenes interview for the Axomiya language version of the TeachAIDS animation at Auditek Digital Recording Studio in Guwahati, Assam.

Pranjal Saikia is an Indian actor. He won a Sangeet Natak Akademi award in 2019 and a Prag award in 2018.
