= Khwairakpam Bishwamittra =

Indian film director

- Born: Khwairakpam Bishwamittra; 1 February 1965; Harinath Road, Brahmapur Aribam Leikai, Imphal East, Manipur
- Occupations: Director, Actor, Script Writer
- Parent(s): Khwairakpam Chittaranjan Singh; Guruaribam Brajeshwori Devi

Khwairakpam Bishwamittra is an Indian film director, actor and script writer who works in theatre and Manipuri films. He first appeared on silver screen in the 1996 hit film Kanaga Hinghouni, where he co-directed with Chan Heisnam. Some of the famous films he directed include Kaorage, Torei and Sur Da Ngaojabee. He is also a renowned playwright of Manipuri Shumang Leelas and stage plays produced by AIR Imphal and Doordarshan DDK Imphal. As of 2022, his non-feature Eewai got official selection at the 4th Nepal Cultural International Film Festival 2022. Eewai was screened at the 28th Kolkata International Film Festival in Short and Documentary Panorama section on 19 and 21 December 2022 at Nandan-III and Sichir Mancha, Kolkata.

== Education ==
Bishwamittra enrolled at Newport University to pursue a bachelor's degree in Telecommunication Engineering. He also earned a bachelor's degree from Manipur University in Political Science (Honors). He received double diploma in Theatre from National Theatre, Studies and Rupmahal Theatre; and diploma in Music from Kharagarh University.

== Career ==
Bishwamittra became a renowned figure in the Manipuri film industry as a director and an actor with his debut film Kanaga Hinghouni (1996), where he co-directed with Chan Heisnam. Pairing with Ksh. Kishorekumar, he co-directed four movies, Iral Oirage (1997), Amambasu Anganbani (1998), Aroiba Natte (1999) and Thamoinadi Kouhouri (2001), produced by Chan Heisnam under the banner Bright Film Manipur. In 2001, he directed Shiroi Lily produced by S. Ibomcha Singh for SB Sons Film and Yaoshangi Meiri (2002) produced by Laishram Lokendra for EUM Imphal. So far, he has directed 54 Manipuri feature films, 19 short fictions and 4 documentaries. He wrote scripts and directed the ballets The Third Eye for Adult Education Department, Government of Manipur in 2007 and Wakollo for Lalit Kala Sangam Imphal in 2014. His short fictions Hang Hang, The Boiling Blood and The Skiff, where he worked as director and script writer, got official selections at the Mumbai International Film Festival (MIFF). Hang Hang was selected in the 18th International Children Film Festival 2013, Hyderabad. In 2009, he produced and directed the movie Shak Henba Bhoot.

Besides films, he is a Senior A Grade approved drama artiste of AIR Imphal and also a Senior Fellow in Dramatic Literature under Ministry of Culture, Government of India. He is an approved announcer of Doordarshan Imphal and AIR Imphal. Bishwamittra is also an empanelled producer of PPC (NE) Doordarshan Guwahati, Doordarshan Imphal and Doordarshan Itanagar. He also worked as an actor and assistant director in the Mahabharat audio drama serial of 53 Episodes produced from 1999 to 2002. He was the Vice President of Film Forum Manipur, Imphal.

Bishwamittra's performance as Ahanjao in the 2018 film Taibang Keithel was recognized by Screen Echoes Manipur as one of the Best 8 Performances in Manipuri Cinema of the Last Decade.

== Accolades ==
Bishwamittra was honoured with different titles at several film and theatre awards and festivals.

Award	Category	Work	Ref.
29th All India Mutlilingual Drama Festival Allahabad 1996	Best Script Writer & Best Actor	Kaklabasu Ahingba Makok	
3rd Manipur State Film Awards 1997	Best Feature Film	Kanaga Hinghouni	
1st SSS MANIFA 2012	Best Direction	Tillaikhombee	
8th Manipur State Film Festival 2013	Best Short Film	Hang Hang	
12th Manipur State Film Awards 2018	Best Actor in a Leading Role - Male	Taibang Keithel	
47th All Manipur Shumang Leela Festival 2018-19	Second Best Scriptwriter	Thaja Machetki Thabal	
Global Independent Film Festival of India 2022	3rd Best Director	Eewai	
15th Manipur State Film Awards 2023	Best Director (Non-Feature) & Best Short Film	Eewai	
International Film Festival of Telangana 2025	Best Screenplay	Yahouthengba Khoimu	
Manipur State Kala Akademi Award 2024	Theatre / Shumang Leela / Performing Arts	His contributions to theatre	

== Selected filmography ==
- Feature Films

Year	Film	Studio (Production House)
1996	Kanaga Hinghouni	Bright Films & Shankar Films
1997	Iral Oirage	Bright Films
1998	Amambasu Anganbani	Bright Films
1999	Aroiba Natte	Bright Films
2001	Thamoinadi Kouhouri	Bright Films
2001	Shiroi Lily	SB Sons Film
2002	Yaoshanggi Meiri	EUM Imphal
2002	Ingengi Atiya (The Sky of Autumn)	Taurus Films
2004	Lallibadi Eini	Taurus Films
2005	Sur Da Ngaojabee	Skyline Pictures
2005	Nongchuptei Thoklakpa Numit	Brajalala Film
2006	Athengbada Pharakpa Thabal	Taurus Films
2006	Kaorage	aar creations
2006	Lonna Lonna	Skyline Pictures
2007	Torei	Taurus Films
2007	Marupki Marup	Palem Panthou Films
2008	Chatlabra Waarouna?	Gabriel Movies
2008	Ningthem	DCC
2008	Nanaakta Asum Asum	Morsta Pictures
2008	Eigee Punshi Mangla Taibangla	Lakhshmi Narayan Films
2009	Paokhum	Western Media
2009	Paachaa	Sang-Gai Film Kangleipak
2009	Shak Henba Bhoot	Millennium Force Manipur
2010	Tillaikhombee	Ningshing Mami, Jiribam
2012	Taionare	Malem Ima
2015	Kum Kang Kum Kabi Chang	Prithi Theatre & Films
2019	Thawai Mirel	Bebeto Cine World

- Non-feature films

Year	Film	Studio (Production House)
2009	Boiling Blood	Millennium Force Manipur
2014	Hinao	Millennium Force Manipur
2015	Hang Hang	Millennium Force Manipur
2016	Khujinda Yotpi	Millennium Force Manipur
2022	Eewai	Nongdol Mamikol
2024	Akangba Pee	Millennium Force Manipur
