= 29th Kolkata International Film Festival =

2023 Indian film festival

- Official Logo
- Opening film: Deya Neya by Sunil Bannerjee
- Location: Netaji Indoor Stadium, Kolkata
- Founded: 1995
- Awards: Golden Royal Bengal Tiger Award for Best Film: Children of Nobody by Erez Tadmor; Golden Royal Bengal Tiger Award for Best Director: Carlos Malave for One Way
- Hosted by: Information and Cultural Affairs Department, Government of West Bengal
- No. of films: 219 films from 39 countries
- Festival date: Opening: 5 December 2023; Closing: 12 December 2023
- Website: kiff.in

Kolkata International Film Festival
- 30th 28th

The 29th Kolkata International Film Festival began on 5 December 2023 at Netaji Indoor Stadium, in Kolkata, India. A 1963 romantic comedy Bengali film Deya Neya by Sunil Bannerjee opened the festival, which screened 219 films from 39 countries. Spain and Australia were country of focus in this edition of the festival. The opening ceremony was attended by Special Chief Guest India Super Star Salman Khan West Bengal Chief Minister Mamata Banerjee, Anil Kapoor, Sonakshi Sinha, Shatrughan Sinha, Mahesh Bhatt and cricketer Sourav Ganguly among others.

The festival closed on 12 December with the announcement of the awards in the closing ceremony, attended by filmmaker Sudhir Mishra, actor-dancer Mamata Shankar and actress Aditi Rao Hydari among others. Children of Nobody by Erez Tadmor, an Israeli film on the challenges faced by inmates of a shelter for at-risk youths was awarded 'Golden Royal Bengal Tiger Award' for the best film whereas Carlos Malave of Venezuela, received the 'Golden Royal Bengal Tiger Award for Best Director' for his film One Way.

== Highlights of the year ==
KIFF's title song

The title song of the festival, written by Srijato, composed by Indraadip Dasgupta and sung Arijit Singh is highlight of this year.

Paying tribute to legends

Indian filmmaker Mrinal Sen, Indian actor Dev Anand, British feature-film, theatre and documentary director Lindsay Anderson, English actor, film director and producer Richard Attenborough, American actor Charlton Heston, Senegalese film director, producer and writer Ousmane Sembène, Indian playback singer Mukesh and Indian Hindi-Urdu Poet, lyricist and film producer Shailendra all having birth centenary this year will be given special tribute in the festival.

Exhibitions of Mrinal Sen and Dev Anand were unveiled at Nandan and Nazrul Tirtha on 7 December.

Bengali Panorama section

The section is a competitive section from this year and the winner's purse is ₹7.5 lakh.

Paying homage through special tribute

Italian actress, model, photojournalist Gina Lollobrigida; Spanish film director, photographer Carlos Saura; English film critic and historian Derek Malcolm; Indian cinematographer Soumendu Roy and Iranian filmmaker Dariush Mehrjui, who all died in 2023 will be paid homage.

PR and social media

A new category called 'PR and social media' is introduced to reach out to people interested in films across the globe.

== Jury ==
=== International jury ===
International Competition: Innovation in Moving Images

- Pavel Lungin, (Chairperson), Russian film director.
- Laurence Kardish, author of Reel Plastic Magic (1972), a textbook on American filmmaking, and has also been a playwright and filmmaker
- Tigmanshu Dhulia, Indian film dialogue writer, director, actor, screenwriter, producer and casting director.
- Ángela Molina, Spanish actress
- Manijeh Hekmat, Iranian film director

Competition on Indian language's films

- Rüdiger Suchsland, German film journalist, film critic and director
- Amal Ayouch, Moroccan actress
- Mariam Al Ferjani, Tunisian actress, scriptwriter, director, and artist

Asian Select (NETPAC Award)

- Patrick F. Campos, associate professor at the University of the Philippines Diliman and Film Institute and a member of NETPAC.
- Madhurima Sinha, Indian writer and filmmaker
- Ilgar Guliyev, Azerbaijan film director

Bengali Panorama

- P. Sheshadri, Indian film director
- Dnyanesh Zoting, Indian director and writer
- Padmapriya Janakiraman, Indian actress

Competition on Indian short films

- Amaresh Chakraborti, retired professor of Satyajit Ray Film & Television Institute, Kolkata
- Abhro Banerjee, film editor
- Paresh Kamdar, Indian director and editor

Competition on Indian documentary films

- R.V. Ramani, Indian filmmaker, cinematographer and teacher,
- Putul Mahmood, filmmaker, producer and teacher
- Malati Rao, Indian filmmaker

== Official selection ==
Sections

- Competition categories
- Non-Competition Categories
  - Best of Contemporary Australian Cinema
- Centenary tribute
- Cinema International

=== Inaugural film ===
Year	English title	Original title	Director(s)	Production countrie(s)
Inaugural Film
1963	Give and Take	Deya Neya	Sunil Bannerjee	India

=== Competition categories ===
==== International Competition: Innovation in Moving Images ====
Highlighted title indicates award winner

Year	English title	Original title	Director(s)	Production countrie(s)
2023	60 Days		Ismail Doruk	Turkey
2022	A Letter from Helga	Svar við bréfi Helgu	Ása Helga Hjörleifsdóttir	Iceland, Netherlands, Estonia
2023	Broken Borders	Soy lo que nunca fui	Rodrigo Alvarez Flores	Mexico
2022	Children of Nobody		Erez Tadmor	Israel
2023	Clara		Sabin Dorohoi	Romania, Germany
2022	Filip		Michał Kwieciński	Poland
2023	Four Seasons		Maxim Shabalin	Russia
2023	Gondola		Veit Helmer	Germany, Georgia
2023	Kaleidoscope Now	Chalchitra Ekhon	Anjan Dutt	India
2023	Land of Our Mothers	Tierra de nuestras madres	Liz Lobato	Spain
2022	One Way		Carlos Daniel Malave	Venezuela
2023	Scarlet Blue		Aurelia Mengin	France
2023	We Will Not Fade Away		Alisa Kovalenko	Ukraine, Poland, France

==== Competition on Indian Language's Films ====
Year	English title	Original title	Director(s)
2023	Avni Ki Kismat		Shonet Anthony Barretto
2023	Quiet Flows the Dead	Ozhuki Ozhuki Ozhuki	Sanjeev Sivan
2023	Blue Sunshine		Samyuktha Vijayan
2023	Kherwal		Uttam Kamati
2023	Joseph's Son	Josephki Macha	Haobam Paban Kumar
2023	The Ascension	Onkara	Unni KR
2023	Valli		Manoj Shinde
2023	Wild Swans	Gorai Phakhri	Rajni Basumatary
2023	Kandeelu The Ray Of Hope		K Yashoda Prakash
2023	Surrender	Samarpan	Arup Manna
2023	Autumn Afternoon	Hemantar Aparanha	Ashoke Viswanathan
2023	A Boy Who Dreamt of Electricity		Jigar Madanlal Nagda
2023	SUZIE Q		Chandan Roy Sanyal
2023	Whispers of Fire and Water		Lubdhak Chatterjee
2023	The Nellie Story	Nellier Kotha	Parthajit Baruah
2023	Saayavanam		Anil Kumar

==== Asian Select (NETPAC Award) ====
Year	English title	Original title	Director(s)	Production countrie(s)
2023	Gods Gift	Tenirberdi	Asel Zhuraeva	Kyrgyzstan
2023	Barren Waters	Nona Pani	Syeda Neegar Banu	Bangladesh
2023	Broken Dreams: Stories from the Myanmar Coup	ကျိုးပဲ့အိပ်မက်များ	The Ninefold Mosaic	Myanmar
2023	Walker		Joel Lamangan	Philippines
2023	Nanda School of Tradition	Nanda Master'nka Chatasali	Pranab Kumar Aich	India
2023	No Winter Holidays		Rajan Kathet, Sunir Pandey	Nepal
2023	And, Towards Happy Alleys		Sreemoyee Singh	India

==== Competition on Indian Short Films ====
English title	Original title	Director(s)
Alvida - The Last Goodbye		Dilu Maliackal
Beep		Mrinal Deka
Funeral Bier	Gahvara	Tariq Mohammad
Last Rehearsal		Kamil Saif
Letterbox		Suman Bhaduri, Suvadeep Sarkar
My Father Is Afraid Of Water	Papa Ko Pani Se Dar Lagta Hai	Prateek Rajendra Srivastava
Pardon		Sahdev Gholap

==== Competition on Indian Documentary Films ====
English title	Original title	Director(s)
Tiger Army		Sourabhkanti Dutta
Forged in Fire		Bindu Nair, Sayyam Khanna
Someday		Vishal P. Chaliha
Music of Rejuvenation	Nobo Jagoroner Gaan	Subha Das Mollick
LANGUR The Man Monkey		Haider khan
Challenge		Ramen Borah
Shrinking Of The Sturdy : Sabar Tales		Abhijit Chakraborty

==== Bengali Panorama ====
Year	English title	Original title	Director(s)
2023	Mind Flies		Rajdeep Paul, Sarmistha Maiti
2023	Autumn Flies	Bijoyar Pore	Abhijit Sri Das
2023	Widows of the wild	Bonbibi	Rajdeep Ghosh
2023	Asampurno		Amartya Sinha
2023	Invisible Chord	Matripaksha	Rajesh Roy
2023	We shall come back	Abar Ashibo Firey	Debapratim Dasgupta
2023	Awnath		Anisul

=== Non-Competition Categories ===
==== Best of Contemporary Australian Cinema ====
Year	English title	Director(s)
2023	Shayda	Noora Niasari
2021	The Dry	Robert Connolly
2021	My Name Is Gulpilil	Molly Reynolds
2023	Limbo	Ivan Sen
2023	Sweet As	Jub Clerc
2023	The Survival of Kindness	Rolf de Heer

==== Centenary tribute ====
International

Year	English title	Director	Production countrie(s)
Charlton Heston
1958	Touch of Evil	Orson Welles	United States
1959	Ben-Hur	William Wyler	United States
Charlton Heston

Year	English title	Original title	Production countrie(s)
Richard Attenborough
1982	Gandhi		United Kingdom, India
Lindsay Anderson
1968	If....		United Kingdom
Ousmane Sembene
1963	Borom Sarret	Charretier	Senegal

Indian

Year	English title	Original title	Language
Mrinal Sen
1972	Calcutta 71		Bengali
1980	Akaler Shandhaney	আকালের সন্ধানে	Bengali
1983	The Case is Closed	Kharij	Bengali
1977	The Marginal Ones	Oka Oori Katha	Telugu
1969	Bhuvan Shome		Hindi
1971	Interview		Bengali

Year	English title	Original title	Director
Dev Anand
1951	Sazaa		Fali Mistry
1970	Johny Mera Naam		Vijay Anand
1967	Jewel Thief		Vijay Anand
1949	Jeet		Mohan Sinha
1965	Guide		Vijay Anand
1956	C.I.D.		Raj Khosla
1951	Baazi		Guru Dutt
Mukesh (singer) and Shailendra (lyricist)
1966	Teesri Kasam		Basu Bhattacharya

==== Cinema International ====
English title	Original title	Director(s)	Production countrie(s)
Sweet Dreams		Ena Sendijarević	Netherlands, Sweden
Anatomy of a Fall	Anatomie d'une chute	Justine Triet	France
How to Have Sex		Molly Manning Walker	United Kingdom
Concrete Utopia	콘크리트 유토피아	Um Tae-hwa	South Korea
The Zone of Interest		Jonathan Glazer	United States, United Kingdom, Poland
Monster	怪物	Hirokazu Koreeda	Japan
About Dry Grasses	Kuru Otlar Üstüne	Nuri Bilge Ceylan	Turkey, France, Germany
Cobweb	거미집	Kim Jee-woon	South Korea
Sleep	잠	Jason Yu	South Korea
Perfect Days		Wim Wenders	Japan, Germany
Fallen Leaves (film)	Kuolleet lehdet	Aki Kaurismäki	Finland, Germany
Ingeborg Bachmann – Journey into the Desert		Margarethe von Trotta	Switzerland, Austria, Germany, Luxembourg
Lost in the Night	Perdidos en la noche	Amat Escalante	Mexico, Germany
Kidnapped	Rapito	Marco Bellocchio	Italy, France, Germany
Club Zero		Jessica Hausner	Austria, Denmark, France, Germany, United Kingdom
A Brighter Tomorrow	Il sol dell'avvenire	Nanni Moretti	Italy, France
Last Summer	L'Été dernier	Catherine Breillat	France
The Old Oak		Ken Loach	United Kingdom, France, Belgium
Critical Zone	Mantagheye bohrani	Ali Ahmadzadeh	Iran, Germany
Behind the Mountains	Oura el jbel	Mohamed Ben Attia	Tunisia, Belgium, France, Italy, Saudi Arabia, Qatar
Explanation for Everything	Magyarázat mindenre	Gábor Reisz	Hungary, Slovakia
Essential Truths of the Lake		Lav Diaz	Philippines, France, Singapore, Portugal, Italy, Switzerland, United Kingdom
Do Not Expect Too Much from the End of the World	Nu aștepta prea mult de la sfârșitul lumii	Radu Jude	Romania, Luxembourg, France, Croatia
The Promised Land	Bastarden	Nikolaj Arcel	Denmark, Germany, Sweden
The Beast	La Bête	Bertrand Bonello	France
The Monk and the Gun		Pawo Choyning Dorji	Bhutan, France, United States, Taiwan
Green Border	Zielona granica	Agnieszka Holland	Poland, France, Czech Republic, Belgium
Io capitano		Matteo Garrone	Italy, Belgium
Daaaaaalí!		Quentin Dupieux	France
The Palace		Roman Polanski	Italy, Switzerland, Poland, France
For Night Will Come	En attendant la nuit	Celine Rouzet	France, Belgium
Red Island	L'Île rouge	Robin Campillo	France, Belgium
Homecoming		Catherine Corsini	France
Through the Night	Quitter la nuit	Delphine Girard	Belgium
MMXX		Cristi Puiu	Romania
Inside the Yellow Cocoon Shell	Bên trong vỏ kén vàng	Phạm Thiên Ân	Vietnam, Singapore, France, Spain
Moro		Brillante Mendoza	Philippines
Mira	Мира	Dmitry Kiselyov	Russian

==== Films on Environment ====
English title	Original title	Director(s)	Production countrie(s)
Antarctica Calling	Voyage au pôle Sud	Luc Jacquet	France
All That Breathes		Shaunak Sen	India, United Kingdom, United States

==== Focus Country: Spain ====
English title	Original title	Director(s)
Matria		Álvaro Gago
Strange Way of Life	Extraña forma de vida	Pedro Almodóvar
20,000 Species of Bees	20.000 especies de abejas	Estibaliz Urresola Solaguren

==== Focus on Australian Horror ====
As spotlight is on Australia, being Special Feature Country, a selection of Australian outback horror films were presented. The festival also launched the 'Kolkata Tram of Horror', to embark on a spine-chilling tram ride through the world of Australian horror films.

English title	Original title	Director(s)
100 Bloody Acres		Cameron Cairnes, Colin Cairnes
Picnic at Hanging Rock		Peter Weir
Wolf Creek		Greg McLean

==== Game On ====
Year	English title	Original title	Director(s)
2022	Shabaash Mithu		Srijit Mukherji
2023	Ghoomer		R. Balki
2022	Jersey		Gowtam Tinnanuri

==== Homage ====
English title	Original title	Director(s)	Production countrie(s)
Gina Lollobrigida
A Dog's Life	Vita da cani	Mario Monicelli, Steno	Italy
Stornellata Romana		Pietro Francisci	Italy
O Sole Mio		Pietro Francisci	Italy
Na sera e maggio		Pietro Francisci	Italy
Soumendu Roy (cinematographer)
Distant Thunder	অশনি সংকেত	Satyajit Ray	India

Year	English title	Original title	Production countrie(s)
Carlos Saura
1990	¡Ay Carmela!		Spain
	J Beyond Flamenco		Spain
Dariush Mehrjui
2020	A Minor	La minor	Iran

==== Kurdish Cinema: In Search of Identity ====
Seven films by the directors of the Kurdish origin will be presented at the festival in a package.

Year	English title	Original title	Director	Production countrie(s)
2016	The Swallow	Die Schwalbe	Mano Khalil	Switzerland
2017	Zagros		Sahim Omar Kalifa	Belgium

==== Pavel Lungin ====
Pavel Lungin is a Russian film director.

Year	English title	Original title	Production countrie(s)
2009	Tsar!	Царь	Russia
1990	Taxi Blues	Такси-блюз	Soviet Union
2006	The Island	Остров	Russia
2012	The Conductor	Дирижёр	Russia
2016	The Queen of Spades	Дама пик	Russia
2019	Leaving Afghanistan	Братство	Russia
2005	Poor Relatives	Бедные родственники	Russia

==== Restored classics ====
Year	English title	Original title	Director	Production countrie(s)
1973	Enter The Dragon		Robert Clouse	Hong Kong, United States
1973	The Exorcist		William Friedkin	United States

==== Retrospective: Bruce Beresford ====
The festival presented a retrospective of six films by the Australian director Bruce Beresford including the 1989 oscar-winning film Driving Miss Daisy.

Year	English title	Original title	Production countrie(s)
1980	Breaker Morant		Australia
1989	Driving Miss Daisy		United States
1991	Black Robe		Canada, Australia
1990	Mister Johnson		United States
1999	Double Jeopardy		United States
2016	Mr. Church		United States

==== Short & Documentary Panorama ====
English title	Original title	Director	Production countrie(s)
Padma Shri Wareppa Naba: Rituals to Mainstream		Bobby Wahengbam	India
The Saga Of A Couplet	Jugoleshu	Palash Das	India

==== Special screening ====
Year	English title	Original title	Director(s)	Production countrie(s)
2023	Junks & Dolls	ASHGHAL HA VA AROUSAK HA	Manijeh Hekmat	India

==== Unheard India: Rare Language Films ====
English title	Original title	Language	Director(s)
Bird Thief	Peta Dochcho		Sounak Kar

== Winners ==
- Golden Royal Bengal Tiger Award for Best Film:
  - Children Of Nobody by Erez Tadmor
- Golden Royal Bengal Tiger Award for Best Director: Carlos Daniel Malave for One Way
- Golden Royal Bengal Tiger Award for Best Short: Last Rehearsal by Kamil Saif
- Golden Royal Bengal Tiger Award for Best Documentary: Challenge by Ramen Borah, Sibanu Borah
- Special Jury mention (Innovation in Moving Pictures): Kaleidoscope Now by Anjan Dutt
- Hiralal Sen Memorial Award Best Film (Indian language's films) : Wild Swans by Rajni Basumatary
- Hiralal Sen Memorial Award Best Director (Indian language's films) : Shonet Anthony Barretto for Avni Ki Kismat
- Bengali Panorama Best Film : Mind Flies by Rajdeep Paul, Sarmistha Maiti
- Special Jury mention (Indian language's films):
  - Joseph's Son by Haobam Paban Kumar
- NETPAC Award for Best Film : Broken Dreams: Stories from the Myanmar Coup by the Ninefold Mosaic
