= 2nd Eikhoigi Imphal International Film Festival =

2025 Indian film festival

- Opening film: Ishanou by Aribam Syam Sharma
- Closing film: Boong by Lakshmipriya Devi
- Location: Imphal, Manipur, India
- Founded: 2022
- Hosted by: Manipur State Film Development Society; Manipur State Film & Television Institute
- No. of films: 53
- Festival date: Opening: 6 February 2025; Closing: 9 February 2025
- Website: eiiff.org

Eikhoigi Imphal International Film Festival
- 1st

The 2nd Eikhoigi Imphal International Film Festival took place from 6 to 9 February 2025 at Imphal, Manipur. The festival had screened 53 films from India and abroad, spread across four venues in Imphal (Manipur State Film Development Society, Chandrakriti Auditorium, Tanthapolis Cinema and Kumecs Cinema). The opening and closing ceremonies were held at City Convention Centre, Palace Compound.

== Events ==
- Master classes
  - Prof. Shyamal Sengupta on 7 February 2025 (The Fundamentals of Direction)
  - Sean McAllister on 7 February 2025 (Filming Intimate Documentary)
  - Shiladitya Bora on 9 February 2025 (Marketing, Distribution and Monetisation of Independent Films)
  - Umesh Vinayak Kulkarni on 9 February 2025 (Exploring Storytelling in Shorts)
- Panel Discussions:
  - Challenges Faced by Manipuri Cine Exhibitors on 6 February 2025

Panelists
Laishram Sanatomba, Haobijam Shantiprabha and Laimayum Surjakanta, moderated by Wahengbam Lalpal

- Cinemagi Honglakliba Saklon Amadi Manipuri Cine Actors on 6 February 2025

Panelists
Amar Mayanglambam, Soma Laishram and Bala Hijam, moderated by Sonia Sorengsangbam

- Stories From The Fringe on 7 February 2025

Panelists
Kivini Shohe, Pradip Kurbah and Borun Thokchom, moderated by Moji Riba

- Manipuri Cinema Amadi Ari-Anougi Langdai on 9 February 2025

Panelists
Kangabam Tomba, R.K. Hemabati and Thongam Thoithoi, moderated by Kharibam Yaiphaba

- Cine Talks
  - Vikramjit Roy on 6 February 2025 (Harnessing Film Production to Boost State's Revenue)
  - Sukamal Deb on 6 February 2025 (Ham Radio and Communication)
  - Subimal Bhattacharjee on 7 February 2025 (Digital Transformation and Film Consumption)
  - Jenica Kalra on 8 February 2025 (Japan-India Content Collaboration: Anime, IPs, and Beyond)
- Eikhoigi Pitch
  - Documentary Pitch on 8 February 2025
  - Fiction Pitch on 8 February 2025
- Cultural & Traditional Showcase
  - Opening Ceremony on 6 February: Moibung, Phisarol, Tribal Dance, Rosy Heisnam, SAM PAA
  - Eikhoigi Legacy on 7 February: Thang-Ta, Dhol Cholom, Thang Leiteng, Guru Rewben Mashangva, Lourembam Bedabati Devi, Sorri Senjam
  - Eikhoigi Impulse on 8 February: Pumpkin Crew & Imphal Breakers, Featherheads, Ereimang
  - Closing Ceremony on 9 February: Laihui Ensemble, Pung Cholom, Basanta Raas

== Jury ==
=== International Competition: Fiction Jury ===
- Susant Misra (Chairman of Jury): Film director
- Ritu Sarin: Film director, producer and artist
- Romi Meitei: Film director

=== International Competition: Non-Fiction Jury ===
- Supriyo Sen (Chairman of Jury): Indian filmmaker
- Tangella Madhavi: Documentary filmmaker
- Oinam Doren: Documentary filmmaker

=== Eikhoigi Pitch: Fiction Jury ===
- Nabin Subba: Nepalese film director
- Fowzia Fathima: Indian cinematographer, producer, academic and director
- Oken Amakcham: Indian actor, director and music composer

=== Eikhoigi Pitch: Non-Fiction Jury ===
- Kivine Shohe: Indian filmmaker
- Uma Vangal: Indian filmmaker
- Sudharak Olwe: Indian documentary photographer

== Official selections ==
The following films have been selected in different categories. All That Breathes and Yairipok Thambalnu made to the official selections and screening schedules were notified, but were not screened at the festival.

=== International Competition: Fiction ===
Highlighted title indicates award winner

| Original title | English title | Director(s) | Production countrie(s) |
|---|---|---|---|
| Village Rockstars 2 | | Rima Das | India |
| Boong | | Lakshmipriya Devi | India |
| မ | MA - Cry of Silence | The Maw Naing | Myanmar |
| Cu Li Không Bao Giờ Khóc | Cu Li Never Cries | Phạm Ngọc Lân | Vietnam, Singapore, France, Philippines, Norway |
| Ullozhukku | Undercurrent | Christo Tomy | India |
| Hangman | | Vihaan | India |
| Nelum Kuluna | Tentigo | Ilango Ram | Sri Lanka |
| Айқай | Scream | Kenzhebek Shaikakov | Kazakhstan |
| Yakshanba | Sunday | Shokir Kholikov | Uzbekistan |
| Buelwa | An Offering | Charmi Chheda | Bhutan |
| गाउँ आएको बाटो | A Road to a Village | Nabin Subba | Nepal |

=== International Competition: Non-Fiction ===
Highlighted title indicates award winner

| Original title | English title | Director(s) | Production countrie(s) |
|---|---|---|---|
| ढोरपाटन | No Winter Holidays | Rajan Kathet & Sunir Pandey | Nepal, South Korea, Romania |
| Where We Used to Sleep | | Matthäus Wörle | Germany |
| তৃতীয় ভুবন | Beyond Boundaries | Sankhajit Biswas & Biswajit Mitra | Australia, India |
| And, Towards Happy Alleys | | Sreemoyee Singh | India |
| Andro Dreams | | Meena Longjam | India |
| Agent of Happiness | | Arun Bhattarai & Dorottya Zurbó | Bhutan, Hungary |
| Bhangaar | Obsolete | Sumira Roy | India |
| Against the Tide | | Sarvnik Kaur | India, France |
| Turtle Walker | | Taira Malaney | India, United States |
| Ukjent Landskap | A New Kind of Wilderness | Silje Evensmo Jacobsen | Norway |

=== North-East Currents ===
| Original title | English title | Director(s) | Production North East Indian State |
|---|---|---|---|
| Ka Chithi | The Letters | Simi Khongtiang | Meghalaya |
| Puinau Puidaa | Stepmother | Kachangthai Gonmei | Manipur |
| Tara: The Lost Star | | Samten Bhutia | Sikkim |
| Bibo Binanao | My Three Sisters | Kenny Deori Basumatary | Assam |
| Indian Women Atlas | | Sunil Dhankher | Manipur |
| Ade (On a Sunday) | | Theja Rio | Nagaland |
| Karken | | Nending Loder | Arunachal Pradesh |
| Chanchisoa | Expectation | Elvachisa Ch. Sangma & Dipankar Das | Meghalaya |
| An Unknown Summer | | Bhaskar Jyoti Das | Assam |
| Delusional Decays | | Tushar Nongthombam | Manipur |
| Aaini Onnai | Mother's Affection | Bishal Swargiary | Assam |

=== World Lenses ===
| Original title | English title | Director(s) | Production countrie(s) |
|---|---|---|---|
| Father's Footsteps | | Mohamad W. Ali | Syria, India |
| Sunflowers Were the First Ones to Know... | | Chidananda S. Naik | India |
| Putulnama | Dolls Don’t Die | Ranajit Ray | India |
| Čovjek koji nije mogao šutjeti | The Man Who Could Not Remain Silent | Nebojša Slijepčević | France, Croatia, Slovenia, Bulgaria |

=== Remastered: The Light of Manipuri Cinema ===
| Original title | English title | Director(s) | Genre |
|---|---|---|---|
| Ishanou | The Chosen One | Aribam Syam Sharma | Fiction |
| Sanakeithel | Golden Market | M.A. Singh | Fiction |
| Chatledo Eidi | Gone With A Heavy Heart | Makhonmani Mongsaba | Fiction |

=== Eikhoigi Montage ===
| Original title | English title | Director(s) | Genre |
|---|---|---|---|
| Swaha | In the Name of Fire | Abhilash Sharma | Fiction |
| Kherwal | | Uttam Kamati | Fiction |
| Appuram | The Other Side | Indu Lakshmi | Fiction |
| Adim | Primitive | Amitabha Chaterji | Fiction |
| The Secrets of Radha | | Subarna Thapa | Fiction |
| Manikbabur Megh | The Cloud and the Man | Abhinandan Banerjee | Fiction |
| In God We Trust | | Uma Vangal | Non Fiction |
| Teere Bendho Na.. | Unanchored.. | Niranjan Kumar Kujur | Fiction |
| Path | | Pradip Kurbah | Shorts |

=== Manipur Matinée ===
| Original title | English title | Director(s) | Genre |
|---|---|---|---|
| Oneness | | Priyakanta Laishram | Fiction |
| Sunita | | Ajit Yumnam | Fiction |
| Laangoi | Enclosure | Manoranjan Longjam | Fiction |
| Langdai Ama | The Juncture | Binoranjan Oinam | Fiction |
| Una Una | As It Sees | Irel Luwang | Fiction |

== Awards and Winners ==
| Award | Film | Director(s) |
|---|---|---|
| Best Fiction: International Competition | MA - Cry of Silence | The Maw Naing |
| Best Non-Fiction: International Competition | Agent of Happiness | Arun Bhattarai & Dorottya Zurbó |
| FIPRESCI Award | Where We Used to Sleep | Matthäus Wörle |
| Special Jury Award | Yakshanba | Shokir Kholikov |

=== Eikhoigi Pitch Awards ===
| Award | Film | Director(s) |
|---|---|---|
| Best Pitch - Fiction | The Scent of the Ripening Field | Alexander Leo Pou |
| Best Pitch - Non-Fiction | Bedabati's Songs | Borun Thokchom |
| Most Promising Project - Fiction or Non-Fiction | The Scent of Mother | Pramoda Nandeibam |
| Emerging Talent - Non-Fiction | Eche Tombi - The Brewer of Andro | Andy Tourangbam & Thokchom Nelson |
| Emerging Talent - Fiction | Khei-Hea (Night & Day) | Ashok Veilou |
