= Nanda Prusty =

Indian teacher (1919–2021)

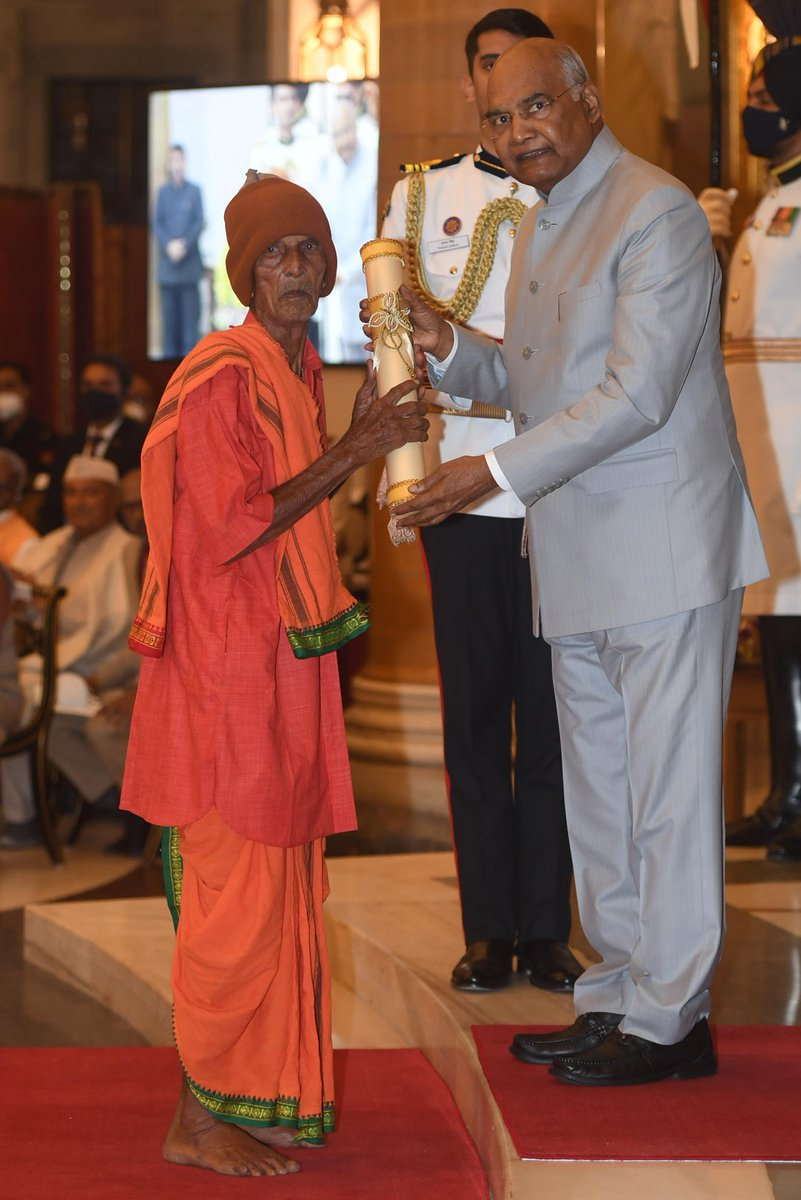
- Prusty getting Padma Shri from President Ram Nath Kovind.
- Born: Nanda Kishore Prusty; 1919; Kantira, Jaipur district, Bihar and Orissa Province, British India
- Died: 7 December 2021 (aged 102); Bhubaneswar, Odisha, India
- Occupation: Teacher
- Spouse: Rukmini
- Children: Ganeshwar, Niranjan, Satyabhama, Gamini
- Parent(s): Nav Prusty, Chandramani Prusty
- Awards: Padma Shri

Nanda Kishore Prusty (1919 – 7 December 2021) was an Indian teacher from Kantira, Odisha. In 2021, he was awarded the Padma Shri for his contribution to education. A Documentary drama film, Nanda Master'nka Chatasali directed by Pranab Aich has been released on his life, struggle and achievements on 12 December 2025 in Odisha.

Prusty died of COVID-19 on 7 December 2021, aged 102.
