= Rajni Basumatary =

Indian filmmaker and actress

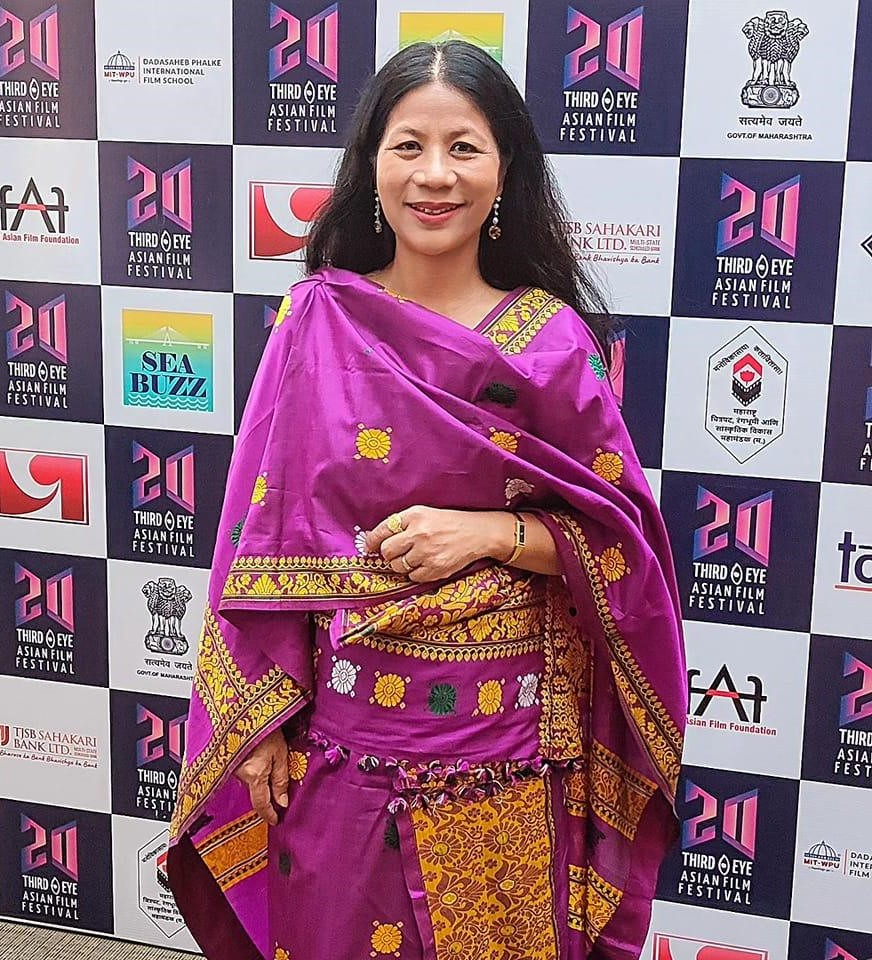
- Rajni Basumatary at the Third Eye Asian Film Festival 2024
- Born: Rajni Basumatary; Rangapara, Assam, India
- Education: Handique Girls College
- Occupations: Film director; film producer; screenwriter; actor
- Years active: 2004—present
- Website: www.rajnibasumatary.com

Rajni Basumatary is an Indian filmmaker, screenwriter, producer and actor from Assam, India. She debuted as a director in 2014 with the Assamese language drama film Raag. The 2019 Boro language film, Jwlwi: The Seed was written, directed and produced by her. It won several awards including the Assam State Film awards for Best Actor (Female) and Best Film in Other Language category, the Jury’s Special Award at Bengaluru International Film Festival 2020, the Jury’s Special Mention at Guwahati International Film Festival 2019, Prag Cine Awards for Best Film in other than Assamese language and Sailadhar Baruah Film Awards for Best Screenplay. Her third directorial film Gorai Phakhri premiered at the Vancouver International Film Festival in 2023. It won Best Film at the 29th Kolkata International Film Festival under the Indian Language Films category. She was awarded Best Director at the 6th Sailadhar Baruah Awards. The film won the Gautama Buddha Award for Best Narrative Feature Film at the Nepal International Film Festival. She was awarded the Director's Vision Award at the 21st Indian Film Festival Stuttgart. Basumatary was honoured with the Bharat Ratna Dr. Bhupen Hazarika National Award 2025.

Basumatary has acted in a few highly successful and acclaimed films, including Mary Kom (2014), The Shaukeens (2014), III Smoking Barrels (2017), Goodbye (2022) and Netflix crime-drama series Rana Naidu (2023).

== Early life and education ==
Basumatary was born in a Boro family and hails from the town of Rangapara, Assam in northeast India. She has recounted her experience of growing up in politically violent times during state insurgency and during the rise of separatist groups and how they impacted her family, childhood and later film career. The film Jwlwi: The Seed, is loosely inspired by her experiences.

Basumatary received her undergraduate degree in Assamese literature from Handique Girls College, Guwahati University.

== Career ==
In 1995, Basumatary moved to Delhi and began directing corporate films. In 2004, she produced and wrote the screenplay for Anuraag, an Assamese-language romantic drama film. Directed by Bidyut Chakraborty, this film also sees Basumatary in a supporting acting role. Anurag was critically acclaimed at its time of release, winning several Assam State Film Awards such as Best Director.

Since the 2000s, she has been a part of print and TV campaigns including Axis Bank and has played minor roles in Bollywood films such as Mary Kom and The Shaukeens as well as in independent films such as Shuttlecock Boys and III Smoking Barrels. She is also the brand Ambassador of Systematic Voters' Education and Electoral Participation (SVEEP).

In 2014, she had her big break when she played Indian boxer Mary Kom's mother in the biopic Mary Kom. Starring Priyanka Chopra in the lead role, the film received critical and commercial acclaim. In the same year, Basumatary released the Assamese feature film Raag, which was her directorial debut. Starring Adil Hussain, Zerifa Wahid and Kenny Basumatary, it was produced by Assam State Film in association with Basumatary's banner Manna Films. It was released all over Assam and in selected cities such as Delhi, Bangalore, Chennai, Hyderabad, Kolkata and Mumbai. Raag was nominated for the Prag Cine Awards in 14 categories including Best Director and Best Screenplay for Basumatary, Best Actor Female for Wahid, Best Actor Male for Adil Hussain, and Best Supporting Actor Male for Kenny Basumatary. It finally won Best Actor Male for Hussain.

In 2019, Basumatary directed her second feature film Jwlwi - The Seed, which was co-produced by artist and philanthropist Jani Viswanath and partially crowdfunded through Wishberry. An independent Bodo-language film, Jwlwi was screened in various international film festivals in India in late 2019 and early 2020 including Bengaluru International Film Festival, Chennai International Film Festival, Guwahati International Film Festival, Kolkata International Film Festival and Pune International Film Festival. Basumatary received the Special Jury Award for directing in Guwahati and a Special Jury Mention in Bangalore for the film. She also received the Best Screen Writer award at the 4th Sailadhar Baruah Memorial Film Awards. Jwlwi: The Seed has garnered over a million views on YouTube.

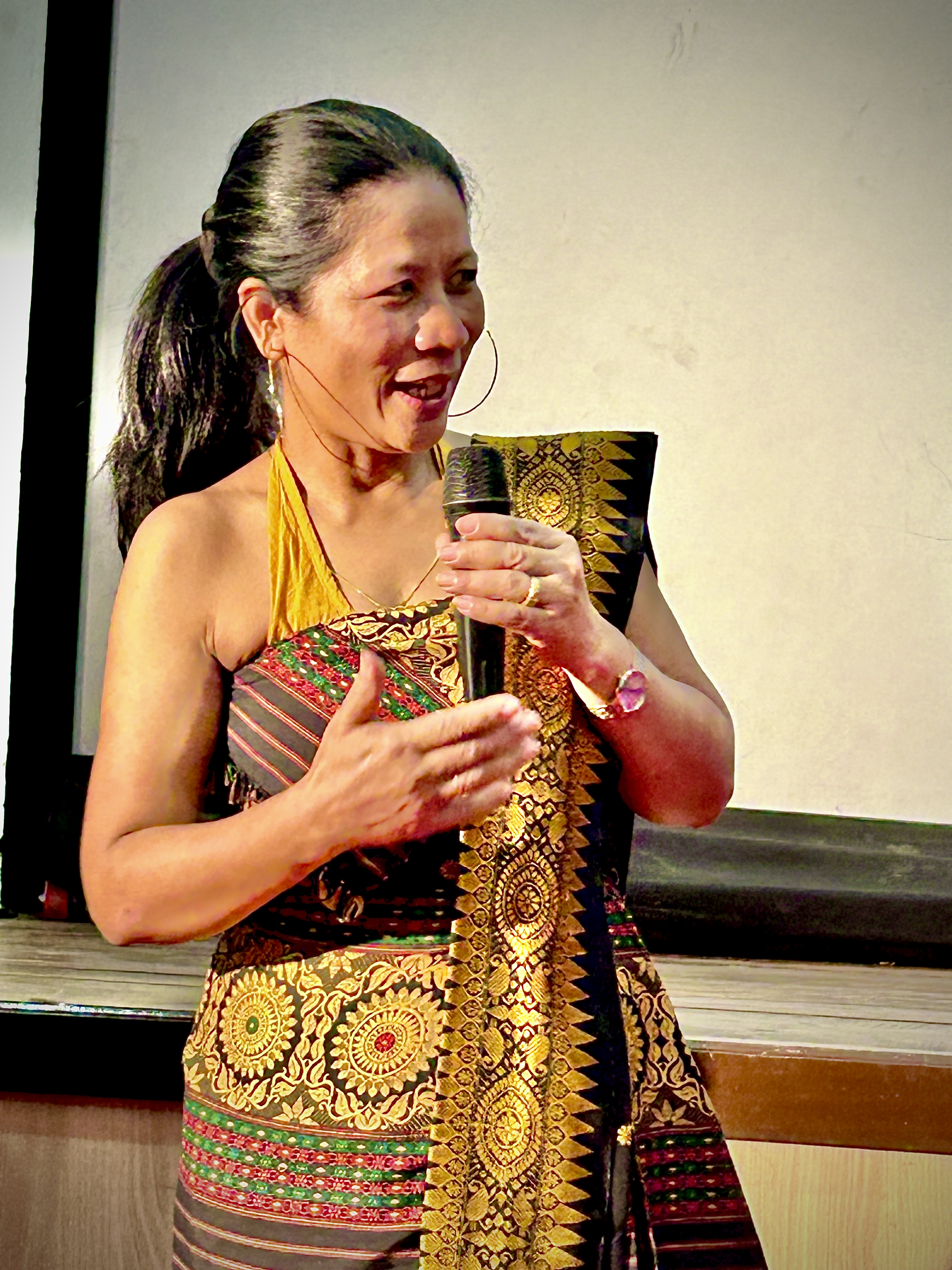
Basumatary at a private screening for her movie, Wild Swans (Gorai Phakhri), in Guwahati. July 2023.

Basumatary has noted Satyajit Ray, David Lean and Vishal Bhardwaj to be her favourite film directors.

== Filmography ==
| Year | Film | Director | Actor | Screenplay | Producer | Notes | Ref. |
|---|---|---|---|---|---|---|---|
| 2004 | Anurag | | Yes | Yes | Yes | | |
| 2011 | Shuttlecock Boys | | Yes | | | | |
| 2014 | Raag | Yes | Yes | Yes | | Cameo role Nominated for Prag Cine Awards 2014 - Best Director; Nominated for Prag Cine Awards 2014 - Best Screenplay | |
| 2014 | Mary Kom | | Yes | | | | |
| 2014 | The Shaukeens | | Yes | | | | |
| 2017 | III Smoking Barrels | | Yes | | | | |
| 2019 | Jwlwi - The Seed | Yes | Yes | Yes | Yes | Winner of Prag Cine Awards - Best Film (Other Than Assamese) Winner of Sailadhar Baruah Memorial Film Awards - Best Screen Writer; Winner of Guwahati International Film Festival - Special Jury Award; Winner of Bengaluru International Film Festival - Special Jury Mention | |
| 2022 | Goodbye | | Yes | | | Directed by Vikas Bahl and starring Amitabh Bachchan | |
| 2023 | Rana Naidu | | Yes | | | Netflix web series | |
| 2023 | Gorai Phakhri | Yes | Yes | Yes | Yes | Winner of Kolkata International Film Festival - Best Film in Indian Language’s Films category Winner of Sailadhar Baruah Awards - Best Director and Best Art Director Winner of Nepal International Film Festival - Best Film Winner of North East India Film Festival - Best Sound Winner of Indian Film Festival Stuttgart - Director's Vision Award | |
