= And, Towards Happy Alleys =

Indian documentary film

- And, Towards Happy Alleys film poster
- Directed by: Sreemoyee Singh
- Written by: Sreemoyee Singh
- Starring: Jafar Panahi; Aida Mohammadkhani; Mina Mohammadkhani; Mohammad Shirvani; Nasrin Sotoudeh
- Narrated by: Sreemoyee Singh
- Edited by: Joydip Das
- Production company: Happy Alleys Films
- Release dates: 21 February 2023 (Berlin); 24 September 2024 (India)
- Running time: 75 minutes
- Country: India
- Languages: English; Persian

And, Towards Happy Alleys is a 2023 Indian documentary film by Sreemoyee Singh. Shot in the form of a travel diary, it contains conversations with Iranian filmmakers, actors, scholars, and activists. The film premiered at 73rd Berlin International Film Festival. It also got selected at the 2nd Eikhoigi Imphal International Film Festival 2025 under the International Competition: Non-Fiction section.

The documentary was shot over a course of seven years. It features Iranian director Jafar Panahi as well as two sisters; Aida Mohammadkhani and Mina Mohammadkhani, who appeared as child actors in Panahi's films The White Balloon (1995) and The Mirror (1997), respectively. Other personalities featured in the film include Iranian filmmaker Mohammad Shirvani as well as human rights activist Nasrin Sotoudeh.

== Production ==
The documentary was filmed by Singh during several trips to Tehran between 2015 and 2019.

== Release ==
And, Towards Happy Alleys had its world premiere at the 73rd Berlin International Film Festival on 21 February 2023. It was released on Mubi on 27 September 2024 in India.

== Reception ==
Santanu Das of Hindustan Times wrote, "Singh's documentation is as much a love letter to Iranian Cinema as it is a reminder of the importance of activism, culminating into a profound denouement with Farrokhzad's verses. It gently illuminates the mind." Saibal Chatterjee of NDTV wrote, "Its strength stems from the way it sees and recognises light in - and at the end of - a tunnel of darkness."
