= Jwlwi: The Seed =

2019 Indian film

Jwlwi - The Seed
- Directed by: Rajni Basumatary
- Screenplay by: Rajni Basumatary
- Produced by: Rajni Basumatary; Jani Viswanath
- Starring: Rajni Basumatary; Shimang Chainary; Raja Narzary; Kanyakorn Kiratichotiyangkoon
- Cinematography: Suruj Deka
- Edited by: Hemanti Sarkar
- Music by: Avinash Baghel
- Production company: Manna Films
- Release date: 2019
- Running time: 90 minutes
- Country: India
- Language: Bodo

Jwlwi - The Seed is a 2019 Bodo-language Indian film directed by Rajni Basumatary. Set in Assam's insurgency ridden 90s, Jwlwi- The Seed is "a story of hope lost and found through resolute perseverance even in the face of seemingly insurmountable odds."

== Cast ==
- Rajni Basumatary as Alaari
- Shimang Chainary as Erak
- Jayanta Narzary as Nizwm
- Kanyakorn Kiratichotiyangkoon as Boonsri
- Queen Hazarika as Mira
- Jeffrey Daimary as Jeffrey
- Pansy Brahma as Ansumwi
- Raj Agnihotri as Major Singh

== Production ==
Jwlwi was produced by Rajni Basumatary under her banner Manna Films and co-produced by artist and philanthropist Jani Viswanath. The filming of the latter part of the movie was completed with crowd funding through Wishberry. Principal photography began in 2018 and was shot entirely in Assam, India and Chiang Mai, Thailand.

Post-production for the film took place in Mumbai, India. The film is edited by Hemanti Sarkar who has previously edited renowned Bollywood films such as Stree, Secret Superstar, Airlift, English Vinglish and Peepli Live.

== Music ==
The background score was composed by Avinash Baghel.

There are three songs in the film –

1. Jeraokhi Thaya Manw (Lyrics – Delvis Basumatary, Music – Delvis Basumatary)
2. Kharson Kharson (Lyrics – Chatrajit Narzary, Music – Gwmwthao Basumatary)
3. Jwngni Nanghthapnai (Lyrics – Swrangcha Sengra Basumatary and Delvis Basumatary, Music – Delvis Basumatary)

== Screening ==
Jwlwi has been screened in international film festivals such as Bengaluru International Film Festival, Chennai International Film Festival, Guwahati International Film Festival, Kolkata International Film Festival and Pune International Film Festival. Jwlwi was privately screened on 27 May 2019 in Chiang Mai, Thailand at SFX Cinema, Maya Lifestyle Mall, followed by a Q&A session. The screening was organized by the Consulate of India, Chiang Mai in association with Indian Studies Center Chiang Mai University (ISCCMU). It was attended by various Consuls General and Honorary Consuls of India, China, Germany, Ireland, Italy, Japan, Myanmar, Portugal and Switzerland. The first trailer and poster for Jwlwi were released at the screening. The film had its official Thai premiere in Bangkok, Thailand at the Foreign Correspondent Club.

Jwlwi earned Basumatary the Special Jury Mention for directing at the Guwahati International Film Festival and a Special Jury Mention at the Bengaluru International Film Festival. The film also received awards for Best Screen Writer (for Basumatary) and Best Film Editor (for Hemanti Sarkar) at the 4th Sailadhar Baruah Memorial Film Awards.

== Release ==
The trailer for Jwlwi was released on YouTube on 26 May 2019 through Basumatary's channel. The second trailer and music videos from the film were released in the next couple of months. Jwlwi was screened in villages of the Bodoland Territorial Area Districts (BTAD) in rural Assam through mobile theatres in late 2019.

Jwlwi had a limited theatrical release in lower Assam on 15 November 2019. It ran houseful consecutively for two weeks in Gold Cinema, Kokrajhar and one housefull week in Jollymax Cinema, Bongaigaon.

Jwlwi is yet to be commercially released in screens outside of Assam. The film is now streaming on the streaming site Moviesaints.

== Accolades ==
- Kalaguru Bishnu Rabha Award for Special Jury Award: Outstanding Performance (Rajni Basumatary) - 8th Assam State Film Awards (2023)
- Phunu Barua Award for Best Film in Other Language in Assam - 8th Assam State Film Awards (2023)
- Best Film (Other Than Assamese) - 11th Prag Cine Awards (2021)
- Best Screenplay (Rajni Basumatary) - 4th Sailadhar Baruah Memorial Film Awards (2020)
- Best Editor (Hemanti Sarkar) - 4th Sailadhar Baruah Memorial Film Awards (2020)
- Special Jury Mention - Bengaluru International Film Festival (2020)
- Official Selection - Chennai International Film Festival (2020)
- Official Selection - Indian Film Festival of Melbourne (2020)
- Official Selection - Pune International Film Festival (2020)
- Official Selection - Tehran International Cine Fest (2020)
- Official Selection - Kolkata International Film Festival (2019)
- Special Jury Mention for Direction - Guwahati International Film Festival (2019)

== See also ==
- Lists of Indian films
- List of Bodo-language films
- List of Assamese films
