= Nanda Master'nka Chatasali =

Nanda Master’nka Chatasali
- Theatrical release poster
- Directed by: Pranab Kumar Aich
- Written by: Pranab Kumar Aich
- Produced by: Abhaya Pati
- Starring: Nanda Prusty
- Cinematography: Pranab Kumar Aich
- Edited by: Pranab Kumar Aich
- Music by: Bibhuti Bhusan Gadnayak
- Production companies: Abhismita Films; Studiowaala Films
- Release dates: 7 December 2023 (Film Festival); 12 December 2025 (Theatrical)
- Running time: 92 minutes
- Country: India
- Languages: Odia; Hindi

Nanda Master’nka Chatasali (English: Nanda School of Tradition) is a hybrid documentary film directed by Pranab Kumar Aich. It is produced by Abhaya Pati under the banner of Abhismita films. The film narrates the journey of Indian centenarian free educationist Nanda Prusty's unwavering commitment and selflessness towards the people of his village. The film premiered at the 29th Kolkata International Film Festival on 7 December 2023, where it competed in the Asian Select (NETPAC Award) category. The film was theatrically released in India on 12th December 2025. Official trailer and poster of the film was launched at Bharat Pavilion at the 77th Cannes Film Festival, 2024.

== Cast ==
- Nanda Prusty
- Khageswar Prusty
- Saisresth Das
- Nityasha Pattnaik
- Shivangi Tripathy
- Rabindra Rout

== Synopsis ==
A coming-of-age journey of an inherent minimalist, who struggles to preserve one of India's last traditional open-air schools called Chatasali. This documentary delves into the life of a mystic teacher, centenarian Nanda Prusty, an ordinary Indian villager who gave free education to the poor for more than 70 years. Transforming from an actor to a teacher, Prusty's narrative extends across three generations, marked by his unwavering commitment to selflessly serve his village on a profound spiritual path. Just before his unexpected death, at the age of 103, he eventually came to limelight after receiving Padma Shri, India's prominent civilian award.

== Production ==
This hybrid documentary follows centenarian Nanda Prusty who ran a roofless school (called Chatasali) for over 70 years in Kantira village in Jajpur, Odisha. Pranab Kumar Aich when offered the chance to make the biography said, “When Nanda Sir’s story came to me, who was I on the earth to reject it. I instantly agreed to do it.”

== Release ==
The film world premiered at the 29th Kolkata International Film Festival on 7 December 2023 and competed in Asian Select (NETPAC Award) in the festival. On 11 May 2024, it was screened in 16th Habitat Film Festival, 2024, in Delhi.The film was theatrically released on 12th December 2025 in India.

== Reception ==
Ganesh Aaglave, writing in Firstpost, praised it as an "emotional experience, and inspiration and above all a symbol of truthfulness, which teaches the true essence of life".

== Awards and recognitions ==
Nanda Master’nka Chatasali also known as Nanda School Of Tradition was nominated in the Asian Select (NETPAC Award) category of 29th KIFF 2023.The film was presented in DOK Leipzig Market Exclusives in DOK Leipzig 2024.

Film Festivals
| Festival Name | Category | Status | ref. |
|---|---|---|---|
| 67th DOK Leipzig, Germany | Market Exclusives | | |
| 34th St. Louis International Film Festival, USA | | Official selection | |
| 29th Kolkata International Film Festival, India | Asian NETPAC AWARD | Nominated | |
| 19th Kanazawa Film Festival, Japan | Choice of Kanazawa | Official selection | |
| 1st Celebrating India Film Festival, India | Best Documentary Award | Nominated | |
| 15th Dada Saheb Film Festival, India | Best Documentary Award | Winner | |
| 3rd Tamilnadu Film Festival, India | | Official selection | |
| 16th Habitat Film Festival, India | | Official selection | |
