= A. J. K. Mass Communication Research Centre =

College of mass communication in Delhi, India

Coordinates: 28.635308°N 77.22496°E

- Type: Research centre
- Established: 1982
- Affiliations: Jamia Millia Islamia
- Location: New Delhi, India
- Website: jmi.ac.in/aboutjamia/centres/mcrc/introduction

A. J. K. Mass Communication Research Centre (AJK MCRC) is a mass communication research centre located in New Delhi, India and a constituent institute of the Jamia Millia Islamia. The full form for AJK MCRC is Anwar Jamal Kidwai Mass Communication Research Centre named after its founder Anwar Jamal Kidwai in 1982.

A. J. Kidwai established the MCRC in collaboration with York University, Toronto and the Canadian International Development Agency. The CIDA provided the MCRC with a range of sophisticated production equipment while York University sent the first generation of teachers. The team from York was led by distinguished documentary filmmaker James Beveridge, a close associate of documentary pioneer John Grierson, founder of the National Film Board of Canada.

== Academics ==
The centre offers courses including PhD in Mass Communication, Master of Arts courses in Mass Communication, Convergent Journalism, Development Communication, Visual Effect and Animation, postgraduate diploma programmes in Acting, Broadcast Technology, and Still Photography and Visual Communication.

In 2019, the centre launched Master of Science program in Mathematics Education in partnership with Cluster Innovation Centre, University of Delhi.

== Facilities ==
=== Production facilities ===
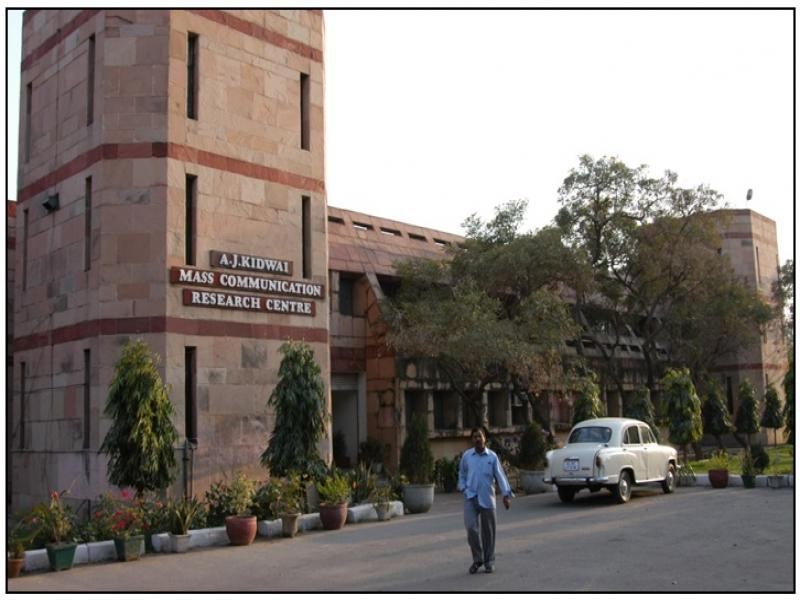
A view of A.J.K. Mass Communication Research Centre

The AJK MCRC has analogue and digital systems for programme production. There are three television studios for multi-camera productions and DV and HDV cameras (PD-150, PD-170, HVR Z-1, DSR 570 and Panasonic DVX 100) with accessories for single camera shoots. Other production equipment includes final cut pro non-linear editing machines of the G5 series, with dual processors for film & video, Avid Adrenaline Media Composers, Arriflex 16 SR III film cameras, Steinbeck film editing machines, digital audio work stations, sound studio, multimedia lab with software for print journalism, and still photography units. Recent additions to the production equipment include the Magnum Dolly system and the PICCOLO crane.

BBC programmes Hard Talk India and Face To Face which were presented by Karan Thapar were shot inside the television studio at AJK MCRC. Programmes were produced with the assistance of AJK MCRC's staff and featured some of the biggest names in Indian public life.

=== Media library ===
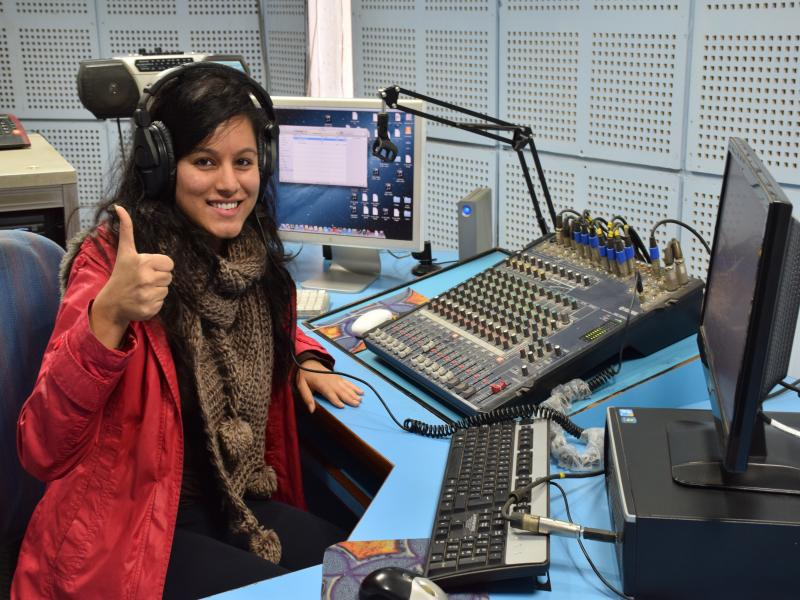
A presenter on Audio Console at A.J.K. Mass Communication Research Centre

The media library has books, journals, films, video cassettes, audio cassettes, stock shots, and press clippings for the use of students. Students can use the Zakir Hussian Library of the university.

=== Community radio ===
The AJK MCRC as a part of its social commitment and responsibility towards the community within which it is situated, runs a community radio station on 90.4 FM. Addressing itself to the residents of the Jamia area, RADIO JAMIA broadcasts educational, enrichment and a wide range of rich socio-cultural programmes. These programmes can be heard around a radius of 10 kilometres on the Jamia campus. Currently, the radio programmes are produced by the students and the faculty of the AJK MCRC in collaboration with different groups and organisation in Delhi.

As per The Hindu, "Radio Jamia, which started in 2005, broadcasts shows from 2-5 p.m. and replays the previous day’s broadcast from 10 a.m. to 1 p.m. The programme broadcast include an hour-long ghazal segment and a 20-minute dedicated show for regional songs covering diverse linguistic communities residing in its service area, apart from shows on education, health, sports and social issues."

=== Media Resource Center ===
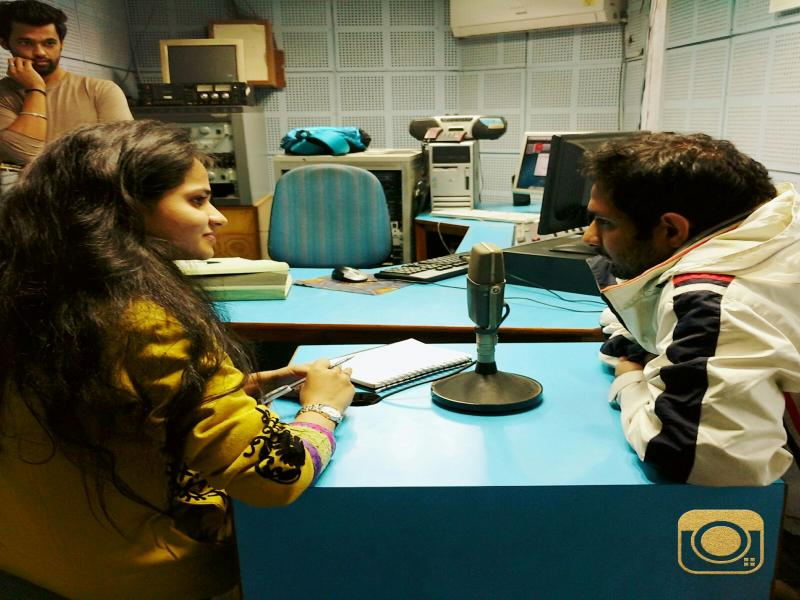
An Interview with Para Cyclist Aditya Mehta By Jyotika Cheema

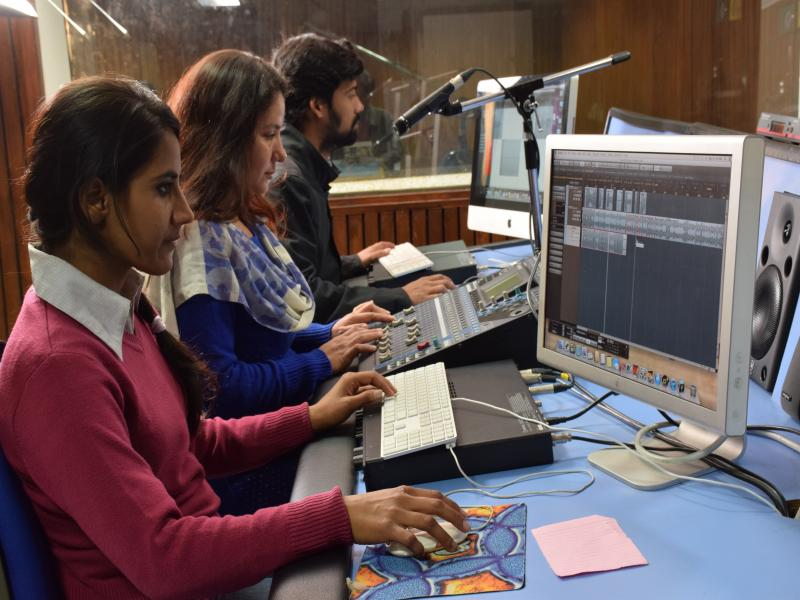
A Scene of Radio Production at A.J.K. Mass Communication Research Centre

The Media Resource Centre at the AJK MCRC is an archive and theory centre devoted to documentary, film and contemporary media practices. It has been set up through a grant from Sir Ratan Tata Trust.

== Student achievements ==
Under the guidance of Professor Farhat Basir Khan, MCRC students Neal Kartik and Pranab Kumar Aich won the prestigious 'Student Focus Competition' at Sony World Photography Awards 2009, Cannes. Jamia's team achieved the feat by defeating 60 of the world's best universities across continents and bagged a cash prize of 50,000 Euros.

In 2020 three alumni of the centre, Nishtha Jain, Shirley Abraham and Amit Mahadesiya, were invited to judge the Oscars by the Academy of Motion Picture Arts & Sciences.

== Ranking ==
In 2021, it was ranked as India's 2nd best Mass Communication College by India Today's. AJK MCRC was ranked #1 in Outlook India's "Top Mass Comm Colleges In 2017".

It has been consistently rated as amongst the top mass-communication colleges in Asia.

== Notable alumni ==
- Roshan Abbas; TV Anchor & RJ
- Harsh Chhaya; Film Actor
- Barkha Dutt; Television journalist & Padma Shri recipient.
- Meenu Gaur; Screenwriter & Director
- Ritu Kapur; Media entrepreneur & Founder, Network18
- Habib Faisal; Screenwriter & Director
- Shazia Ilmi; News Anchor & Politician
- Nishtha Jain; Noted Documentary Film-maker
- Sharat Katariya; Film Director
- Kabir Khan; Celebrated Film Director
- Shahrukh Khan; Noted Film Actor
- Sushmit Ghosh; Academy Award nominated filmmaker
- Rintu Thomas; Academy Award nominated filmmaker
- Pranab Kumar Aich; Documentary Filmmaker and Photographer
- Hardik Mehta; Filmmaker
- Kiran Rao; Film director and Producer
- Alankrita Shrivastava; Film Actor
- Danish Siddiqui; Photojournalist
- Loveleen Tandan; Film Director
- Danish Aslam; Film Director
- Neha Dixit; Indian Journalist
- Saba Dewan; Documentary Film-maker
- Gayathri Prabhu, Indian novelist and academic
