= The Game of Votes =

Book by Farhat Basir Khan

- Author: Farhat Basir Khan
- Language: English
- Subject: Indian Politics
- Publisher: SAGE Publishing
- Publication date: 5 August 2019
- Publication place: India
- Pages: 264
- ISBN: 978-93-5328-692-7

The Game of Votes: Visual Media Politics and Elections in the Digital Era is a 2019 non-fiction book by Indian photographer Farhat Basir Khan, and faculty member at the AJK Mass Communication and Research Centre, Jamia Millia Islamia.

The book has a foreword by former President of India Pranab Mukherjee, which The Times of India called "incisive".

The Game of Votes is centred on the changing trends in elections and examines what Khan sees as the paradigm shift in political campaigning most evident in the campaigns of Barack Obama, Donald Trump and Narendra Modi.

The book was published by SAGE in August 2019.
