= Wild Swans (2023 film) =

- Directed by: Rajni Basumatary
- Written by: Rajni Basumatary
- Produced by: Jani Viswanath; Rajni Basumatary
- Starring: Helina Daimary; Sangeena Brahma; Mithinga Narzary; Anjali Daimari
- Cinematography: Chida Bora
- Edited by: Tinni Mitra
- Music by: Avinash Baghel
- Release dates: 29 September 2023 (VIFF); 10 December 2023 (KIFF)
- Running time: 95 minutes
- Country: India
- Language: Boro

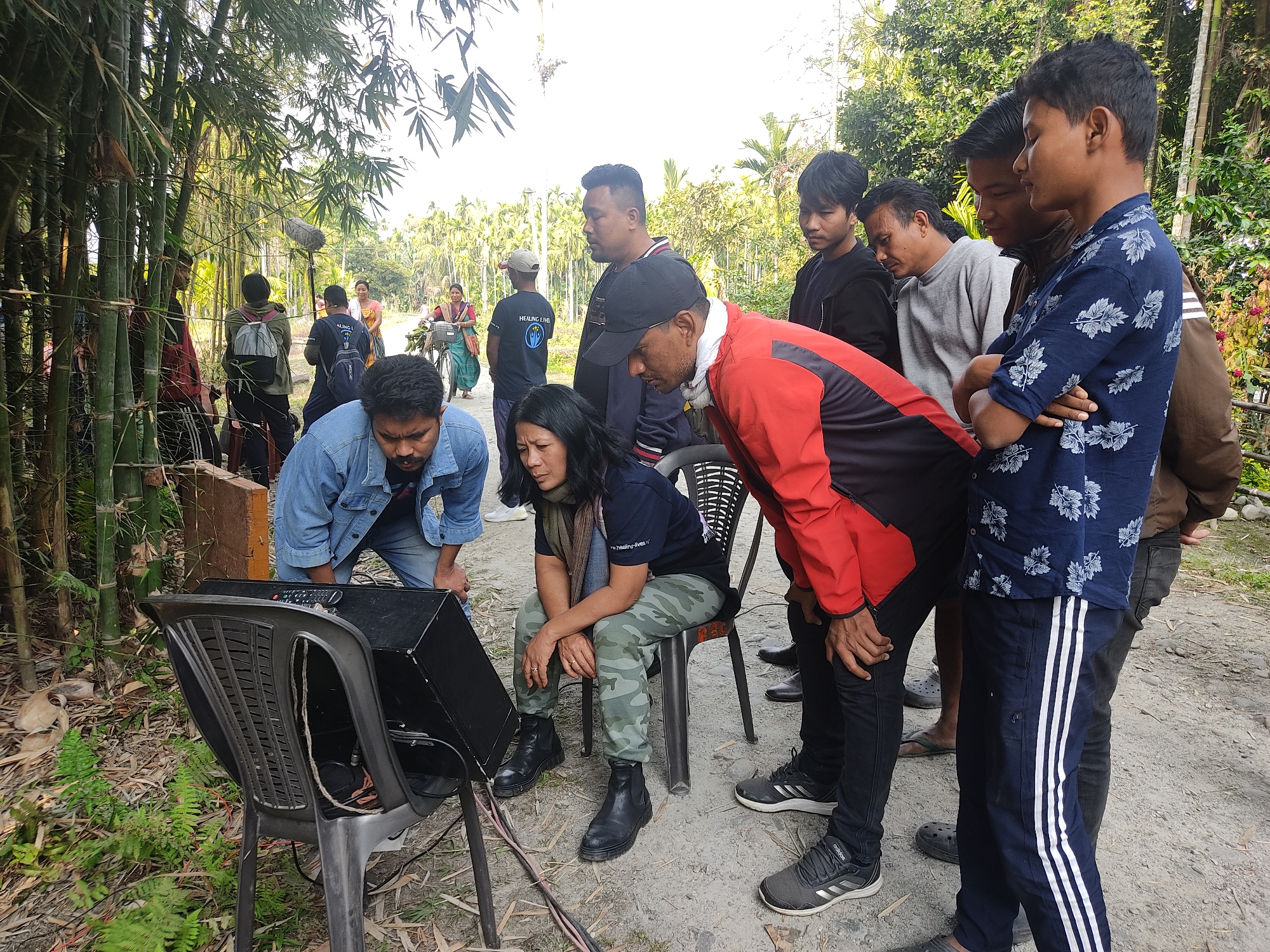
Rajni Basumatary during the shoot of Wild Swans in Assam, India in 2022.

Gorai Phakhri, also known as Wild Swans, is a 2023 Indian Boro-language drama film written and directed by Rajni Basumatary and produced by Jani Viswanath. The film has an all-female cast. It stars Helina Daimary, Sangeena Brahma, Mithinga Narzary and Anjali Daimari. The film premiered at the Vancouver International Film Festival 2023 on 29 September 2023.

The film won the Best Film award at the 29th Kolkata International Film Festival under the Indian Language Films category. The film was awarded the Director's Vision Award at the 21st Indian Film Festival Stuttgart 2024.

== Plot ==
Set in the foothills of Bodoland in Northeast India, the story explores the lives of women in a patriarchal society recovering from decades of armed conflict between the State and separatist groups. Their experiences of repression and fighting back are interwoven.

Preeti, a doctoral student from the city comes to the village for her fieldwork. Her romantic ideas of rural life are crushed after witnessing the effects that militarization and patriarchy have on the everyday lives of these women.

Mainao and Gaodaang raise their teenage children as single mothers. Mainao's husband, a rebel, was killed by security personnel. Gaodaang's husband is a soldier in the Indian army posted along the country's border. Once inseparable friends, they are now struggling with the bitter legacies left behind by their husbands. Middle-aged Malothi is gang raped by an armed patrol one night. Her husband abandons her labeling her "unclean".

But winds of change are about to blow.

== Cast ==
- Helina Daimary as Preeti
- Sangeena Brahma as Gaodaang
- Mithinga Narzary as Mainao
- Anjali Daimari as Malothi
- Dwijiri B. Basumatary as Sonathi
- Milina Daimari as Daisy
- Queen Hazarika as Anondi
- Ramileswari Brahma Boro as Sikhiri
- Dolly Kikon as herself
- Mwnabili Brahma as Renu Boro
- Rajni Basumatary as Bimuli

== Production ==
The film is set in the foothills of Bodoland in Northeast India. The film has an all-female cast and most crew members are women. The film was shot in February 2022 in Guwahati and Udalguri in the Northeast Indian state of Assam. The post-production was completed in August 2023. The film is produced by Jani Viswanath and co-produced by Rajni Basumatary.

This is Rajni Basumatary's third directorial film. The film tells interwoven stories about village women ganging up against patriarchy in the milieu of armed conflict prevalent in India's Northeast region.The film hopes to take forward the dialogue on the subject. The film is inspired by stories part of Basumatary's own upbringing.

== Release ==
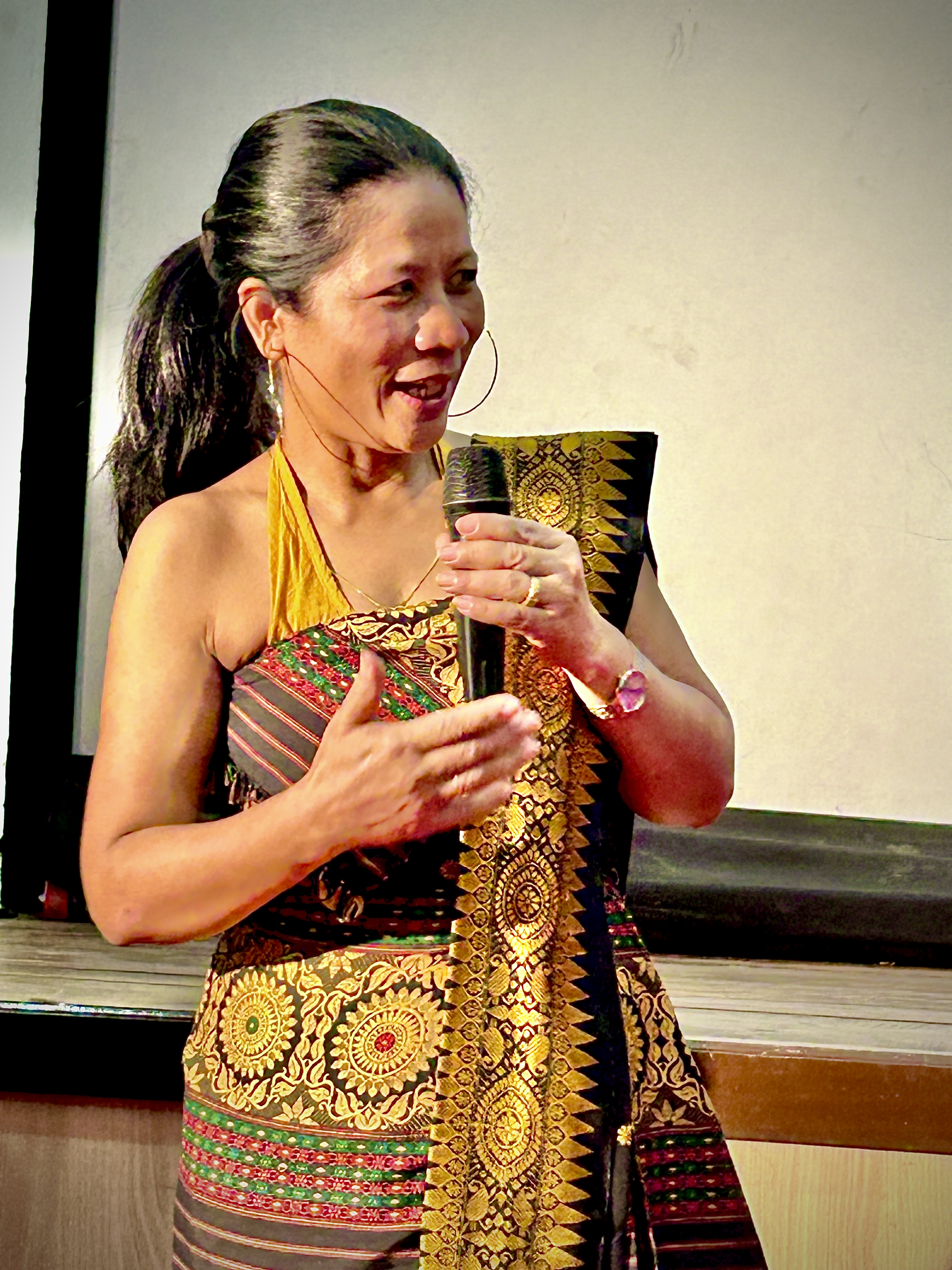
Basumatary at a private screening for the movie in Guwahati. July 2023.

The film premiered at the Vancouver International Film Festival on 29 September 2023. It was the first Boro-language film that was selected for this section of the festival. It was the only Indian Indian feature film at the festival.

The film had its Indian premiere at the 29th Kolkata International Film Festival in December 2023. It was also screened at the 1st North East India Film Festival, Manipur 2024.

== Awards ==
The film won the Best Film award at the 29th Kolkata International Film Festival under the Indian Language Films category. It won the Best Director at the 6th Sailadhar Baruah Awards. It won the Best Art Director at the 6th Sailadhar Baruah Awards. It won the Gautama Buddha Award for Best Narrative Feature Film at the Nepal International Film Festival. It won the Director's Vision Award at the 21st Indian Film Festival Stuttgart.

== See also ==
- Vancouver International Film Festival
- Kolkata International Film Festival
- Nepal International Film Festival
- Indian Film Festival, Stuttgart
