= Farhat Basir Khan =

Indian photographer (born 1957)

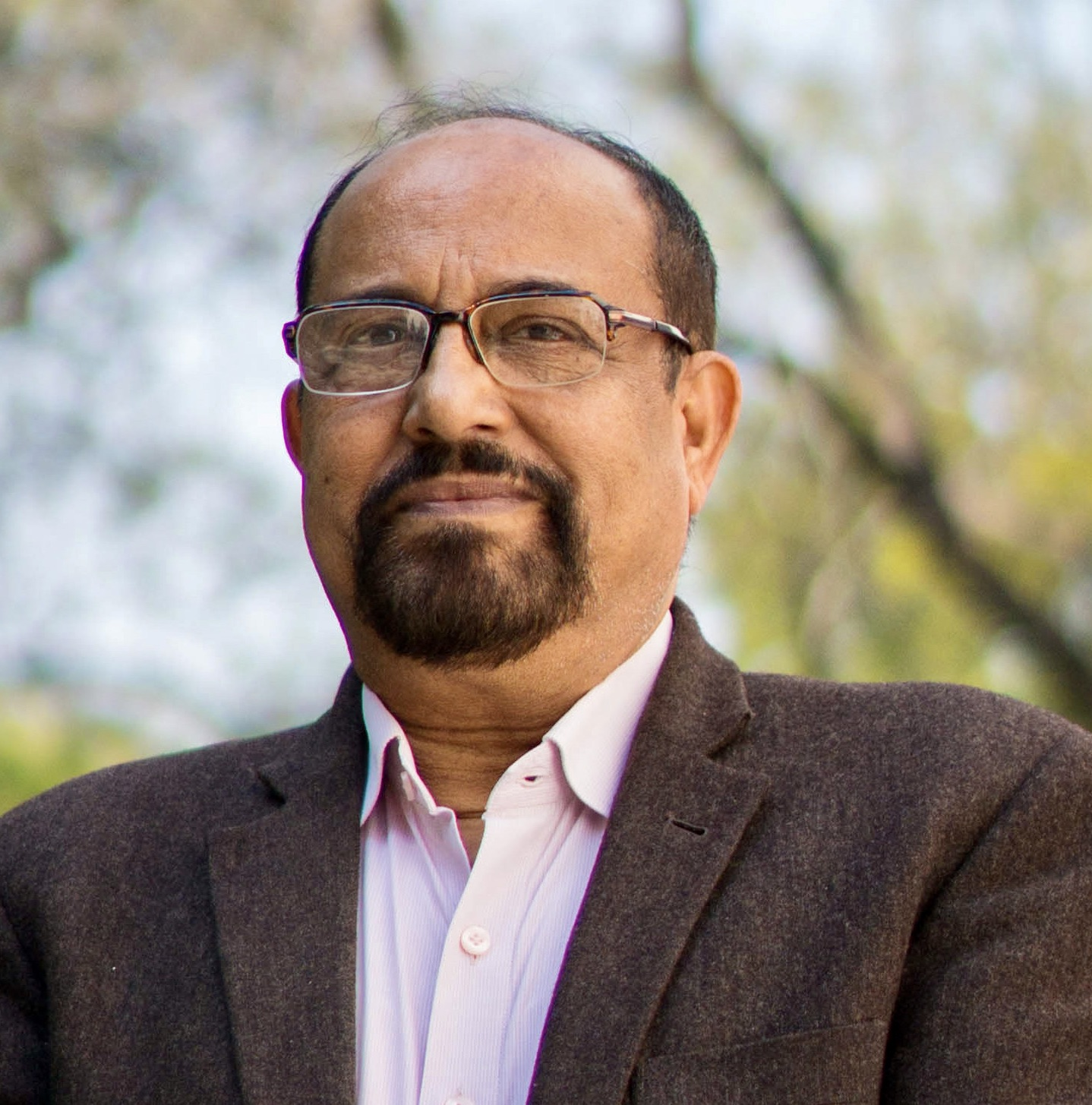
- Khan in 2022
- Born: Gorakhpur, Uttar Pradesh, India
- Other name: F. B. Khan
- Occupations: Academic, photographer
- Years active: 1975–present

Farhat Basir Khan is an Indian photographer. He has made contributions to photography and media studies in India, both as an academic as well as an industry professional.

Khan has also served as the Professor of Media & Communication at the AJK Mass Communication and Research Centre where he officiates as the director of the centre in absence of the director

He uses media formats like walk in multimedia installation for symposium.

He has served as a member of many previous juries such as International CMS Vatavaran Film Festival, Delhi; Fuji Film Super Six, Film Photography and Animation Festivals at IIT Kanpur and Delhi; and for the last several years at the International Broadcast Convention for Content Creation, Management & Delivery in Netherlands, Amsterdam.

Khan produced the fifty-year commemorative audio-visual for UNICEF India as well as WHO SEAR. and contributes regularly to several electronic, print and web media.

== Academic career ==
Khan joined the AJK, Mass Communication Research Centre, where he heads the Photography, Multimedia & Audiovisual sections and holds the Maulana Abdul Kalam Azad Chair.

== Contribution to Cinema, Media and Academics ==
During his career as an academic he has taught Shah Rukh Khan, Roshan Abbas, Barkha Dutt, Kabir Khan, Loveleen Tandan, Aseem Mishra and Saurabh Narang.

=== Commercial Work ===
He has contributed to various international projects such as the One World programme for UNICEF delegates on Unspooling the Documentary Process and for institutes such as MIT, Russian Film School and Harvard Business School. Khan was chosen to make an Audio Visual for Commemoration of 50 years for both UNICEF and WHO from amongst all the Professional Photographers around the world.

==== Sony World Photography Awards, Cannes ====
He brought to India the World Photography Award – Student Focus at the Palais des Festival in Cannes, defeating finalists from all the other continents. It was won by the team he was leading, consisting of two of his students at AJK Mass Communication Research Centre, Jamia in 2009. In 2010, the team led by him were the Asia finalists. The award brought the focus of World Photography on India and AJK Mass Communication and Research Centre.

==== Research on the Female Gaze ====
Based on his study of curated work of various female photographers, Khan attributes the female gaze to anything that has been photographed by a woman which according to him is actually breaking the stereotypical view created by "male-constructed" photographs that have shown women in a certain light throughout the history of visual arts.

=== Campaign for Soldiers "Chitthi Aayi Hai" ===
In an attempt to encourage and inculcate letter-writing habit among youngsters, Khan conceived and curated a multimedia project #ChitthiAayiHai, where people photographed themselves and got it printed on a postcard, which they posted with a personalised message to their loved ones and soldiers.

=== Documenting Reality: Metaphors of Life ===
Khan delivered a lecture in Lucknow at the Lalit Kala Academy, talking about the importance of sound effects, the direction of light, and relation with characters to take a good picture. He used the examples from works of Vincent van Gogh, Andrey Tarkovsky and Alfred Hitchcock to explain the importance of image and its perception in relation with other mediums.

== Bibliography ==
- The Game of Votes. India: SAGE India. 2019. ISBN 9789353286927.
