= Pranab Kumar Aich =

Indian filmmaker and photographer

- Born: 15 April 1986; Jajpur, Odisha, India
- Education: A.J.K. Mass Communication Research Centre
- Occupations: Filmmaker, Photographer
- Years active: 2008-Present
- Notable work: Nanda Master'nka Chatasali
- Website: www.pranabkaich.com

Pranab Kumar Aich is an Indian filmmaker and photographer from Odisha, India. He is the winner of the Sony World Photography Award in 2009 held in Cannes for his work on the environment. He is known for his multiple award-winning short documentary City's Step Child, Manayun My Wonderland, and Torch. His debut Odia feature film Nanda Master’nka Chatasali was nominated in Asian Select (NETPAC Award) in 29th Kolkata International Film Festival, 2023 and also presented in DOK Market Exclusives of 67th DOK Leipzig.

== Education ==
Pranab studied Post Graduate Diploma in Photography and Visual Communication from A.J.K. Mass Communication Research Centre, Jamia Millia Islamia, New Delhi.

== Career ==
He started his career in New Delhi working as a volunteer for NGOs like Goonj, American India Foundation and Manzil to gain an in-depth understanding of humanitarian issues. Later, he produced audio visual content on international developmental issues for NGOs. He enrolled for Post Graduate Diploma in Photography and Visual Communication from A.J.K. Mass Communication Research Centre, Jamia Millia Islamia. In 2009, while studying in AJKMCRC, he became the first Indian Student to win Sony World Photography Award held in Cannes where he was trained by legends in documentary photography like Mary Allen Mark, Susan Welchman, Adrian Evens. He was recently invited to Busan International Film Festival, 2024 to participate in Platform Busan, a sidebar of the festival, which hosts emerging talented filmmakers from around the world.

His short documentary films, Manayun: My Wonderland and Torch won the prestigious 34th Odisha State Film Awards, 2022 in Best Documentary Film and Special Jury Award respectively. His first Odia feature film Nanda Master’nka Chatasali was selected in DOK Market Exclusives of 67th DOK Leipzig, 2024 which made it the one and only Odia language film to feature in the prestigious film festival.

In 2025, his documentary project "DEVI" (Goddess) was one of the five documentary films selected in Waves Film Bazaar (Market section of IFFI, Goa) in Co-production Market in documentary category.

== Filmography and Awards ==
Film	Year	Type	Worked as	Awards and Nominations	Ref
City’s Step Child	2014	Short	Writer/ Director/ Editor	Selected in the best 30 micro-documentaries of "Innovators around the World" Micro-Documentary Salon in the 6th Beijing International Film Festival, China and Won Main Prize in Category G - Short films at International Festival of Sustainable Development Films, Bratislava, Slovakia	
I have a Colored Dream	2015	Short	Writer/ Director/ Editor		
Manayun My Wonderland	2022	Short	Writer/ Director/ Editor	Nominated for Durban International Film Festival Audience Award, Best Documentary Award - 34th Odisha State Film Awards, 2022	
Torch	2022	Short	Writer/ Director/ Editor	Nominated for Durban International Film Festival Audience Award, Special Jury Award - 34th Odisha State Film Awards, 2022	
Nanda Master’nka Chatasali	2023	Feature	Writer/ Director/ Editor	Nominated in Asian Select (NETPAC Award) in 29th Kolkata International Film Festival, 2023 and presented in DOK Market Exclusives of 67th DOK Leipzig.	
