= Joseph's Son =

2023 Indian film

- Promotional poster
- Josephki Macha
- Directed by: Haobam Paban Kumar
- Screenplay by: Sudhir Naoroibam; Haobam Paban Kumar
- Story by: Sudhir Naoroibam
- Produced by: National Film Development Corporation Limited; Prithul Kumar
- Starring: Rewben Mashangva
- Cinematography: Joydeep Bose
- Edited by: Sankha
- Music by: Rewben Mashangva; Sound designer: Sukanta Majumdar
- Production companies: National Film Development Corporation; Oli Pictures
- Release date: 2023
- Running time: 83 minutes
- Country: India
- Language: Manipuri

Joseph's Son (Meiteilon: Joseph ki Macha) is a Manipuri film released in 2023. It is based on a true story and features Rewben Mashangva. The film was directed by Haobam Paban Kumar and produced by the National Film Development Corporation Limited, with Oli Pictures as a co-producer. The screenplay was written by Sudhir Naoroibam, a Sahitya Akademi Award winner, alongside Haobam. The film premiered at the 25th Shanghai International Film Festival in June 2023, where it was the only Indian film among 11 which competed for the Golden Goblet Award.

The film was listed by Firstpost as one of five Manipuri films to watch in 2026.

== Synopsis ==
Joseph's Son follows the story of Joseph, a highlander caught in the midst of ethnic clashes as he searches for his missing son. The film portrays Joseph's escalating fear and anxiety as he grapples with the turmoil of ongoing conflict and his personal concerns. David, Joseph's son, is a dedicated footballer who has not returned home. His absence prompts his mother to persuade Joseph to undertake the search for him. After exhausting all avenues with David's friends and finding no leads, Joseph turns to the police for assistance. They inform him that a body in the Imphal morgue may belong to David, and that he needs to verify the identity of the body in person. Despite his reservations and the daunting nature of the journey, Joseph reluctantly embarks on the long and arduous trip to Imphal. The film delves into Joseph's emotional and physical challenges as he confronts the possibility of a tragic outcome while navigating the chaos surrounding him.

== Screening ==
In November 2023, Joseph's Son was selected for screening at the 29th Kolkata International Film Festival (KIFF), which took place on 5 December 2023.

It was also featured at the 28th International Film Festival of Kerala 2023 in Thiruvananthapuram.

Additionally, the film was one of the 14 nominees for the Alternativa Film Awards 2023 in Kazakhstan.

== Accolades ==
Award	Category	Winner's name(s)	Ref.
1st North East India Film Festival, Manipur 2024	Best Direction	Haobam Paban Kumar	
1st North East India Film Festival, Manipur 2024	Jury Award for Outstanding Performance	Rewben Mashangva	
29th Kolkata International Film Festival	Special Jury Award	Haobam Paban Kumar	
20th Kazan International Film Festival, Russia	Special Jury Mention	Haobam Paban Kumar	
1st Guwahati Asian Film Festival 2025	Best Film	Haobam Paban Kumar	
1st Guwahati Asian Film Festival 2025	Best Music	Rewben Mashangva	
16th Manipur State Film Awards	Best Direction	Haobam Paban Kumar	
16th Manipur State Film Awards	Best Cinematography	Joydeep Bose	
16th Manipur State Film Awards	Best Editing	Sankha	
16th Manipur State Film Awards	Best Audiography (Location sound recording)	Sabyasachi Pal	
16th Manipur State Film Awards	Best Lyricist	Rewben Mashangva	
16th Manipur State Film Awards	Best Screenplay	Sudhir Naoroibam & Haobam Paban Kumar	
