= Haider Khan (photographer) =

Indian photographer

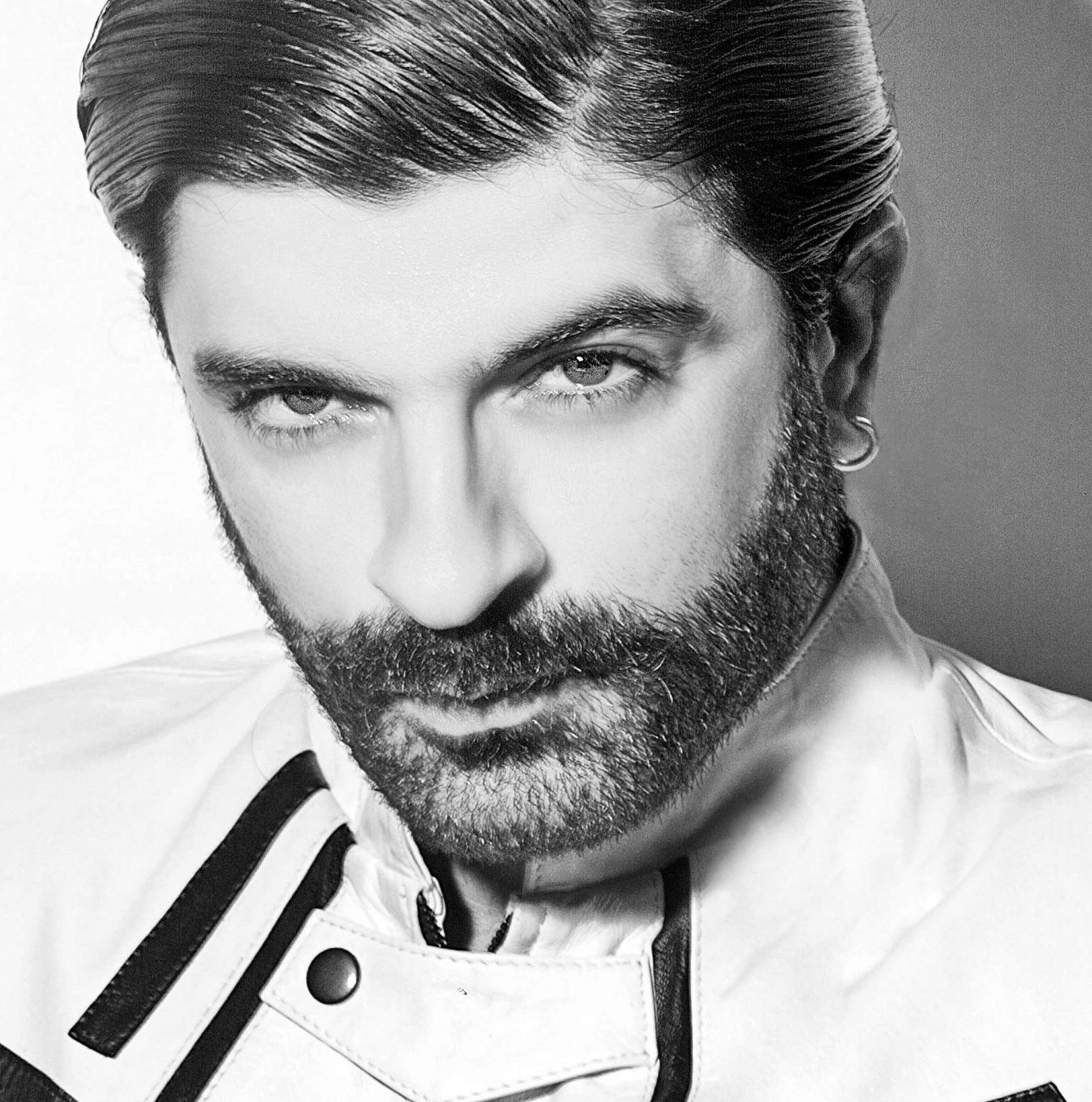
Photographer and director Haider Khan

Haider Khan is a photographer and a Filmfare award winning director in the Indian film industry. Khan’s directorial projects span feature films, short films, and documentaries. His film Langur has won the Best Non-Fiction Film at the Filmfare OTT Awards 2025, marking a notable achievement in his filmmaking career. Khan was also the winner of the National Award, India, in the 2022 Sony World Photography Awards. In 2024, he placed second in the wildlife & nature category at the Sony World Photography Awards. His work was found notable and he was the only Indian to speak at the World Photography Organisation event PHOTO IS:RAEL in Israel. He is also the official photographer with EARTH.ORG

== Film ==
His directorial debut feature film Rohingya - People from Nowhere was released on 15 November 2021 and has won International Awards.

== Documentaries ==
Manjunath to Manjamma: Chronicles of a Transgender. The screening was part of the short documentary competition at the 17th International Documentary and Short Film Festival of Kerala (IDSFFK), organized by the Kerala State Chalachitra Academy.

His documentary film, "LANGUR The Man Monkey," has won Filmfare OTT Awards 2025 and earlier it has been selected to compete as an Indian documentary film at the 29th Kolkata International Film Festival.

The documentary on "Black India", also got selected as short documentary / film at the several international film festivals.

== Photography ==
As a photographer he shot the launch campaign of Being Human and Being Strong and has shot cover photographs for magazines including GQ, Filmfare, Stardust, and People, and was the official photographer for events like Femina Miss India, Grasim Mr.India, and Gladrags Megamodel.

== Awards and recognition ==
- 2024 Honourable Mentioned at International Centre of Martial Arts for Youth Development and Engagement, Busan South Korea under the auspices of UNESCO
- Winner of 2022 Sony World Photography Awards
- Winner/Gold at PX3 2021 Prix de la Photographie de Paris

== Trivia ==
- He was once sketched by famous Bollywood actor Salman Khan
