= Rewben Mashangva =

Indian folk musician (born 1961)

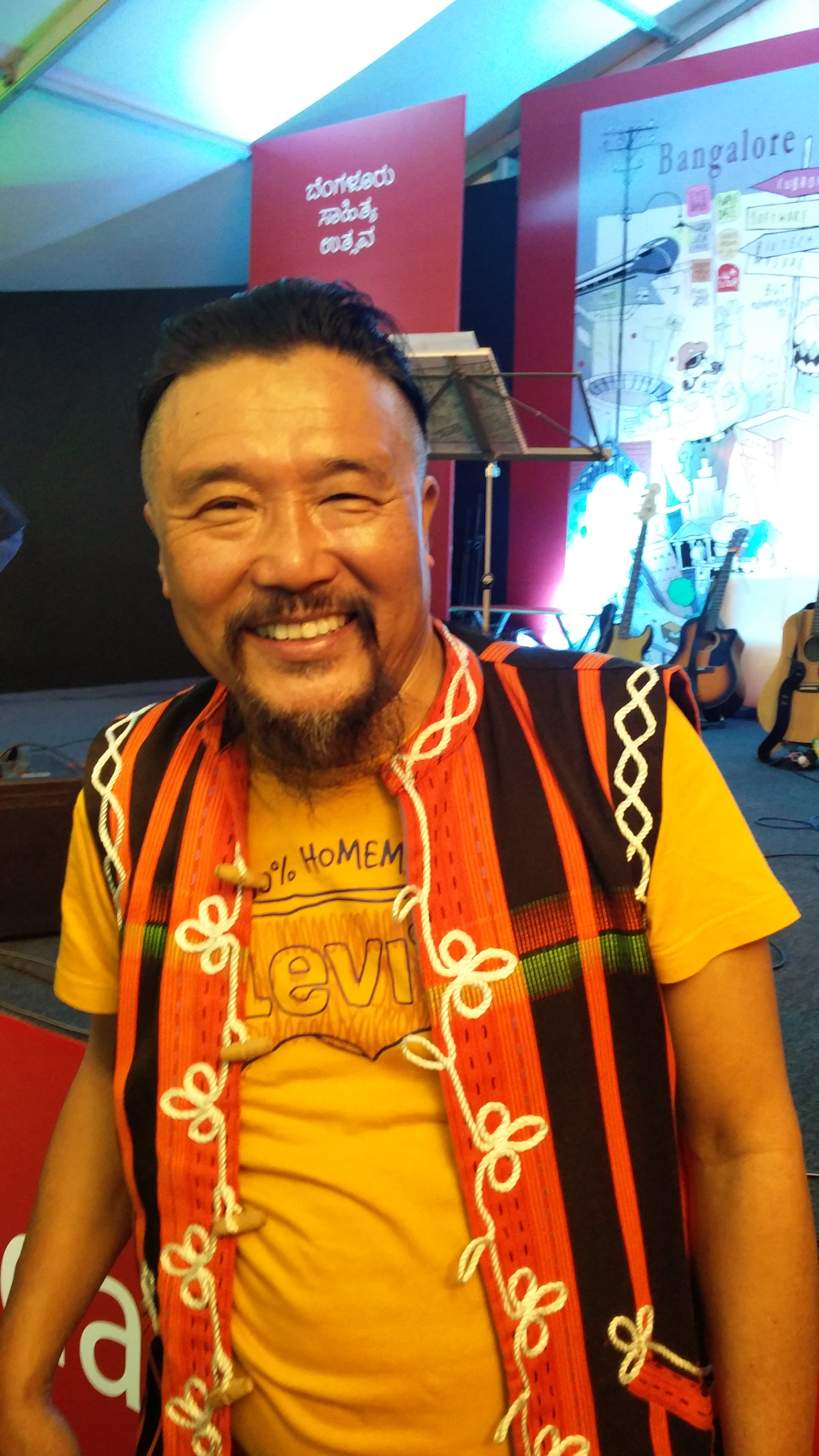
- Closeup of Rewben Mashangva at Bangalore Literature Festival, 2016

Background information
- Born: 21 June 1961 (age 65); Ukhrul, Manipur, India
- Genres: Folk
- Occupation: Hao music exponent
- Instruments: Guitar, flute, folk fiddle, harmonica
- Years active: 1985–present
- Website: rewben.com

Rewben Mashangva, also Guru Rewben Mashangva (born 21 June 1961), is a folk musician and singer from Manipur, India. He is known for reviving musical tradition of the Tangkhul Naga of Manipur, and use of traditional musical instruments in his songs. Influenced by musicians such as Bob Dylan and Bob Marley, Rewben Mashangva has created many Naga tribal folk songs based on blues and ballad rhythms. He is known by different names including, 'Bob Dylan of the Nagas' and 'King of Naga folk blues', plus 'Father of Naga folk blues'. He received the National Tribal Award 2011–12, for his contribution to the development of tribal music from the Ministry of Tribal Affairs, Government of India. The Government of India honoured him in 2021, with the award of Padma Shri, the fourth highest Indian civilian award for his rich contribution to art.

Mashangva was featured in the first season of The Dewarists, along with The Raghu Dixit Project.

== Acting ==
In 2023, Rewben made his acting debut in the Manipuri film Joseph’s Son, which had its world premiere at the Shanghai International Film Festival. He received the Jury Award for his portrayal of Joseph in the film at the 1st North East India Film Festival, Manipur. He also won the Best Music award for the film at the 1st Guwahati Asian Film Festival 2025. At the 16th Manipur State Film Awards, he was honored with the Best Lyrics award.

Rewben's performance as Joseph in film was recognized by Screen Echoes Manipur as one of the Best Eight Performances in Manipuri Cinema of the Last Decade.

== Discography ==
- Tantivy (1999)
- Creation (2006)
- Our Story (2012)
