= Swaha: In the Name of Fire =

2024 Indian Magahi-language horror drama film

- Directed by: Abhilash Sharma
- Written by: Abhilash Sharma, Shilpee Bhardwaj
- Produced by: Vikash Sharma
- Starring: Sonalli Sharmisstha, Satya Ranjan, Chandra Shekhar Dutta
- Cinematography: Devendra Golatkar
- Edited by: Suresh Pai, Abhilash Sharma
- Production company: Prajna Films
- Release date: 2024
- Country: India
- Language: Magahi

Swaha: In the Name of Fire is a 2024 Indian Magahi-language horror drama film written and directed by Abhilash Sharma. Produced under the banner of Prajna Films by Vikash Sharma, the independent feature stars Sonalli Sharmisstha, Satya Ranjan, and Chandra Shekhar Dutta.

The film secured its world premiere at the 26th Shanghai International Film Festival within the Asian New Talent Competition segment, where Abhilash Sharma won the Golden Goblet Award for Best Director and Satya Ranjan received the Best Actor accolade. It subsequently made its domestic debut at the 29th International Film Festival of Kerala (IFFK) under the Indian Cinema Now section.

== Plot ==
Set against a bleak rural backdrop in Bihar, the narrative centers on Rukhiya, an impoverished mother left to fend for herself after being abandoned by her husband, Phekan. Lacking basic resources, her immediate struggle revolves around keeping her newborn son alive in an environment heavily impacted by systemic caste discrimination, hunger, and deep-seated social hostility. Her path repeatedly intersects with Nehura, a local crematory worker. The film explores these themes of societal marginalization, culminating in a sequence centered on fire—a motif tying back to the Sanskrit ritual term used in traditional offerings.

== Cast ==
- Sonalli Sharmisstha
- Satya Ranjan
- Chandra Shekhar Dutta
- Buloo Kumar
- Kunal Kumar
- Ravi Kumar
- Sarbind Kumar
- Sriparna Chakraborty

== Production ==
The film's screenplay was a collaborative effort between Abhilash Sharma and Shilpee Bhardwaj. Devendra Golatkar functioned as the director of photography, while the editing duties were shared between veteran editor Suresh Pai and director Abhilash Sharma.

Shot entirely in a stark monochrome format, the director noted in an interview with Vague Visages that the choice of black-and-white cinematography was intentional, serving as a visual extension of the characters' profound emotional and social isolation. The dialogue is delivered entirely in Magahi, a regional language natively spoken across central Bihar and select areas of eastern India.

== Accolades ==
Year	Festival	Category	Recipient	Result
2024	Shanghai International Film Festival (Asian New Talent)	Best Director	Abhilash Sharma	Won
2024	Shanghai International Film Festival (Asian New Talent)	Best Actor	Satya Ranjan	Won
2025	Bengaluru International Film Festival (Chitrabharati – Indian Cinema Competition)	Third Best Indian Film	Swaha: In the Name of Fire	Won
2025	Dhaka International Film Festival (Spiritual Film Section)	Special Mention Award	Swaha: In the Name of Fire	Won
2025	SR Socially Relevant Film Festival New York	Best Narrative Feature	Swaha: In the Name of Fire	Won
2025	SR Socially Relevant Film Festival New York	Best Actress	Sonalli Sharmisstha	Won
2025	ImagineIndia International Film Festival	Life Award (first place)	Swaha: In the Name of Fire	Won
2025	ImagineIndia International Film Festival	Best DOP (second place, ex aequo)	Devendra Golatkar	Won
2025	ImagineIndia International Film Festival	Best Film Poster (third place)	Kevin Ilango	Won
2025	Religion Today Film Festival	Best Feature Film	Swaha: In the Name of Fire	Won
2025	South of Brazil International Film Festival	Best Cinematography – Feature Film	Devendra Golatkar	Won
2025	South of Brazil International Film Festival	Best Soundtrack – Feature Film (Honorable Mention)	Devarshi Varma	Won

== Reception ==
The film garnered analytical coverage across several major media outlets during its festival run. Writing for Scroll.in, critic Nandini Ramnath described the feature as a "visually striking exploration of rural blight," highlighting how the production effectively integrated traditional folk tracks derived from Bihari oral histories to anchor its atmosphere.

A review from Moneycontrol published during IFFK 2024 characterized the narrative framework as an "arresting spiritual take on the tyranny of fate," drawing specific attention to its depiction of conditions surrounding Bihar's marginalized Musahar community. Sweta Kaushal, reviewing the title for Forbes, framed it fundamentally as a haunting, localized exploration of motherhood isolated by absolute systemic poverty. Additionally, an assessment by Asian Movie Pulse noted its challenging, distinct social and anthropological merit, while observing that its rigid structural choices might require extra context for audiences unfamiliar with the regional subtext.
