= Shuttlecock Boys =

- Directed by: Hemant Gaba
- Screenplay by: Hemant Gaba
- Produced by: Hemant Gaba; Thakur Dass; Pankaj Johar
- Starring: Aakar Kaushik; Manish Nawani; Vijay Prateek; Alok Kumar
- Cinematography: Shanti Bhushan
- Edited by: James Joseph Valiakulathil
- Music by: Avinash Baghel
- Production company: Penny Wise Films Private Limited
- Release dates: 2 October 2011 (Chicago South Asian Film Festival); 3 August 2012 (India)
- Running time: 76 minutes
- Country: India
- Language: Hindi
- Budget: ₹ 3,500,000 (70,000 USD$)

Shuttlecock Boys is an independent film directed by Hemant Gaba & produced by Pankaj Johar and Hemant Gaba. It's a film made by all first timers in the cast and crew. Most cast are non-actors and didn't have any formal training. The film was shot handheld on 16 mm with sync sound using real locations in Delhi, Noida & Gurgaon.

== Plot ==
Shuttlecock Boys revolves around the lives, successes and failures of four friends who hail from lower-middle-class backgrounds in Delhi. Protagonists Gaurav, Manav, Pankaj and Loveleen seek answers to questions like "should we accept what life offers to us on a platter or should we try to chase our dreams, taking the path less taken?" They decide to embark upon an eventful journey that will change the course of their lives and careers forever. The one thing that unites these four friends is their common love for badminton. Every evening they meet for a couple of games in their neighbourhood, joking about their lives and pulling each other's legs. This part of the day is the most pleasant part of their otherwise dreary lives. While playing badminton one such night, they decide to do something on their own. This very attempt becomes their lifeline putting them on a litmus test of determination, courage, luck and spirit of friendship.

== Production ==
The film was shot in 18 locations over a period of 22 days in Delhi, Gurgaon and Noida. There were no formal permissions to shoot on the roads, markets and highway, so everything was done in a Guerilla Style. The interiors were all real locations mostly office locations and houses.

Not having money to light exteriors in the night, a 5 row grid was created of Chinese Lanterns (having 5 of them in each row) by DOP Shanti Bhushan & Associate Cameraman Nuthan Nagraj to shoot badminton scenes in the night. There were not enough funds to hire professionals in key areas like Production Design, Costume & Line Production. Bhavya Palia who had never even seen a film set joined stepped in as Line Producer in the very last moments just before the shoot and eventually managed the production along with Producer / Executive Producer Pankaj Johar. Prachi Singh who was initially hired just as an Assistant Director ended up donning multiple hats and handled costumes and production design. Catering was managed by Pushpa Gaba from Director/Producers' homes.

== Music ==
There are four songs in the film –

1. Ruk Naa Tu Ab Kahin (Lyrics – Prachi Singh)
2. Zindagi Hai Ek Shuttle (Lyrics – Manas Mishra)
3. Dilli Ke Chaar Ladke (Lyrics – Gaurav Solanki)
4. Zindagi Hai Ek Shuttle (Slow Version)

All four songs are composed & sung by Avinash Baghel. The songs have been used as background score.

== Reviews ==
Shuttlecock Boys had a limited release in theaters in select cities on 3 August 2012.

- "Shuttlecock Boys Movie Review {3.5/5}: Critic Review of Shuttlecock Boys by Times of India". The Times of India. 3 August 2012.
