= Tangella Madhavi =

Indian documentary filmmaker

Tangella Madhavi is an Indian documentary filmmaker based in Mumbai. An alumna of SRFTI, she holds a post-graduate diploma in Social Communications Media from Sophia Polytechnic, Mumbai and a Masters in English from Mumbai University. She was also selected for the prestigious Asian Film Academy and is a recipient of the SARAI Fellowship. She is currently a faculty at the Direction and Screenplay Writing at Satyajit Ray Film and Television Institute, Kolkata.

== Filmography ==
- The Last Act, 2008 : Maya recounts an incident from her childhood and finally in the 'last act' gathers courage to tell her father that he was wrong. The short film made at SRFTI was screened at Tehran International Short Film Festival, Twilight Film Festival, New Delhi (Awarded Best Screenplay), IndieLisboa`08 (Portugal), Stuttgart`s Bollywood and Beyond festival, Short Film Festival, Montecatini, Italy. CUT IN (TISS), Mumbai. Awarded the best screenplay and second best film.
- Penchalamma, 2009: Set against the backdrop of an upcoming SEZ, the film unravels an old woman’s struggle to retain her plot of land.
- Listen Little Man, 2007: While few lost their life, others put up a fight with self and the world around. The documentary film presents the varied experiences of students who have been ragged and their modes of protest. The film was produced by PSBT.
- Dhaga Mil Gaya (I Found A Thread), 2009: The film presents the world of Malti, a Gandhian living in sewagram. The narrative takes interesting turns as the director’s lifestyle come face to face and stands in contrast to Malti’s. Overcoming doubts, the director goes ahead and indulges into another pair of expensive shoes but things will never be the same for her. The NHK, Japan production was awarded Silver Conch at Mumbai International Film Festival, Mumbai, 2010.
- Anna Sound Please!, 2010: Produced by Majlis, The film explores the culture of slum cinema in Mumbai which screen Telugu film for migrants who primarily work as construction labourers.
- Chasing Tails, 2015: Produced by Films Division.
