= The White Balloon =

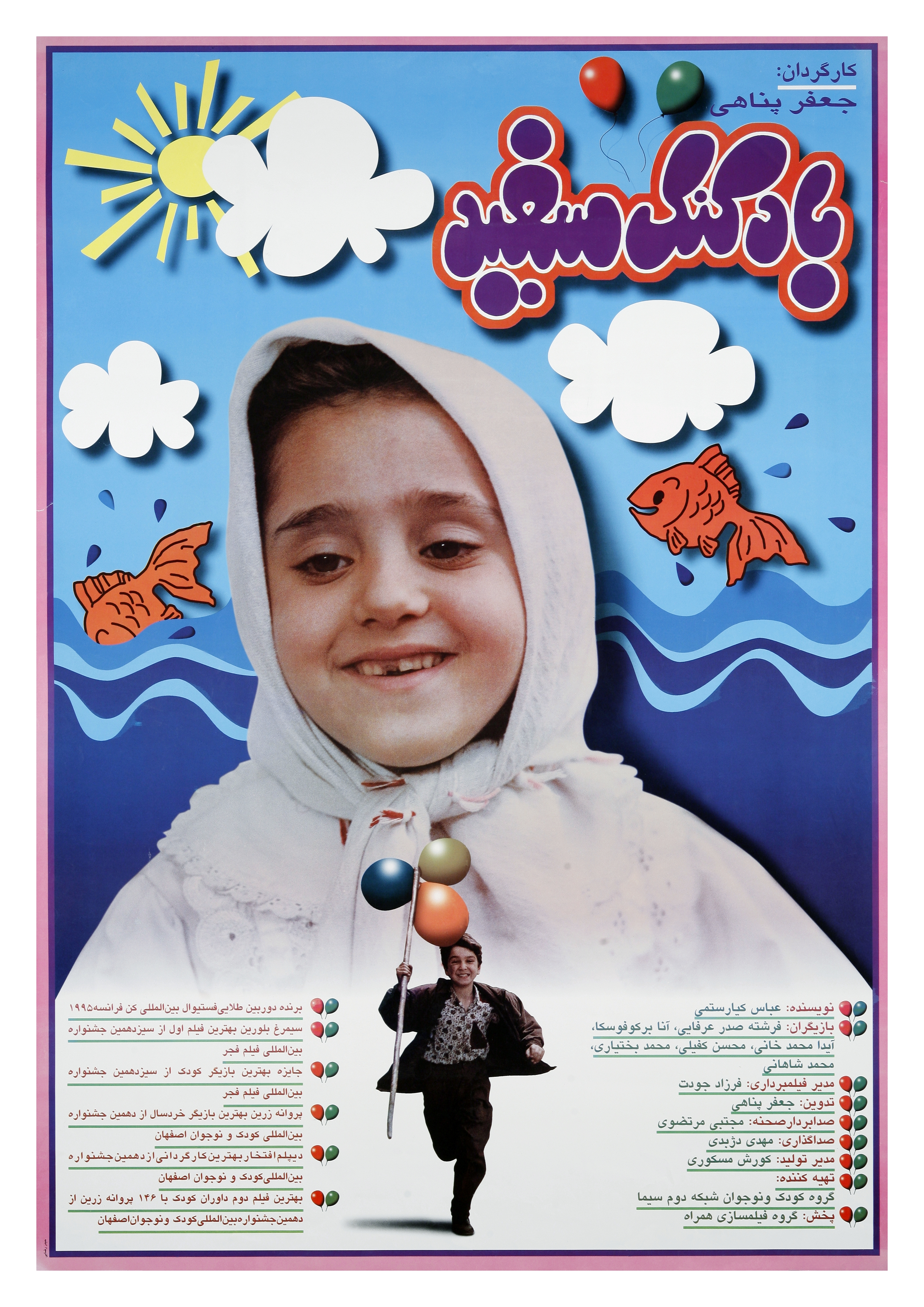
- Theatrical release poster
- Directed by: Jafar Panahi
- Written by: Abbas Kiarostami
- Produced by: Kurosh Mazkouri
- Starring: Aida Mohammadkhani; Mohsen Kafili; Fereshteh Sadre Orafaee
- Cinematography: Farzad Jadat
- Edited by: Jafar Panahi
- Distributed by: October Films
- Release date: 1995
- Running time: 85 minutes
- Country: Iran
- Language: Persian

The White Balloon (Persian: بادکنک سفيد, Badkonake sefid) is a 1995 Iranian drama film directed by Jafar Panahi, in his feature film directorial debut, with a screenplay by Abbas Kiarostami. The film received many strong critical reviews and won numerous awards in the international film fairs around the world including the Prix de la Camera d'Or at the 1995 Cannes Film Festival. The Guardian has listed this film as one of the 50 best family films of all time. The film is on the BFI list of the 50 films you should see by the age of 14.

The film was selected as the Iranian entry for the Best Foreign Language Film at the 68th Academy Awards, but was not accepted as a nominee. Iran unsuccessfully tried to withdraw the film from contention but the academy refused to accept the withdrawal.

== Plot ==
It is the eve of the Iranian New Year. The film opens in a Tehran market where seven-year-old Razieh (Aida Mohammadkhani) and her mother are shopping. Razieh sees a goldfish in a shop and begins to nag her hurrying mother to buy it for the festivities instead of the skinny ones in her family's pond at home. Almost all of the film's major characters are briefly seen in this market scene, though they are not introduced to the viewer until later. On their way home, mother and daughter pass a courtyard where a crowd of men has gathered to watch two snake charmers. Razieh wants to see what is happening but her mother pulls her daughter away, telling her that it is not good for her to watch these things.

Back home, Razieh is upset about her mother's refusal to let her buy a new goldfish, and continues to nag her mother. Her older brother Ali (Mohsen Kalfili) returns from a shopping errand for their father. He complains that he asked Ali to buy shampoo, not soap, then throws the soap at him. Ali sets off to buy the shampoo and when he returns Razieh asks him to help in changing her mother's mind about the goldfish, bribing him with a balloon. Ali thinks that the 100 tomans cost for the goldfish is a waste of money but helps Razieh in petitioning their mother nonetheless. Her mother gives her the family's last 500-toman banknote and asks her to bring back the change. Razieh sets off with an empty glass jar to the fish shop a few blocks away.

Between their home and the fish store, Razieh manages to lose the money twice, first in an encounter with the snake charmer, and then when she drops the money through the grate at the entrance to a store which has been closed for the New Year celebration.

Razieh and Ali make several attempts to retrieve the money and while doing so encounter many people, including a kind older woman at the fish shop, the owners of a nearby shop, and an Iranian soldier. The money, however, is always just out of reach. Finally, the siblings receive help from a young Afghan street vendor selling balloons. He carries all of his balloons on a wooden stick, which has three balloons left. Razieh, Ali, and the Afghan boy are unable to retrieve the note with only the stick, so Ali comes up with the idea of sticking gum to the bottom of the stick to retrieve the bill. Ali leaves to buy gum, but returns without any, and finds that the Afghan boy has left Razieh at the grate. However, the Afghan boy soon returns with his stick, now with only one white balloon, and a pack of chewing gum he bought for the group. The group attaches a piece of gum to one end of the balloon stick, and with it they reach down through the grate and pull the money out.

The film ends, not with Ali and Razieh, but on a still shot of the young Afghan boy, as he sits at the grate watching Ali and Razieh leave for the shop and soon afterwards return home from buying the goldfish. The Afghan boy sits alone with his stick and white balloon for a while, as the Iranian year 1374 begins, then he gets up to walk away.

== Reception ==
The White Balloon has an approval rating of 83% on review aggregator website Rotten Tomatoes, based on 24 reviews, and an average rating of 6.9/10. The website's critical consensus states: "The White Balloon tells a simple yet powerfully effective story through a child's eyes, inviting audiences to see familiar surroundings from a different perspective."

John Simon of The National Review wrote "Few films are pure delight, but White Balloon is one of these" .

== Accolades ==
- Prix de la Camera d'Or, 1995 Cannes Film Festival
- Gold Award, Tokyo International Film Festival, 1995
- Best International Film, Sudbury Cinéfest, 1995
- International Jury Award, São Paulo International Film Festival, 1995

== See also ==
- List of submissions to the 68th Academy Awards for Best Foreign Language Film
- List of Iranian submissions for the Academy Award for Best Foreign Language Film
