= No Winter Holidays =

Nepali documentary film

No Winter Holidays: ढोरपाटन
- Directed by: Rajan Kathet; Sunir Pandey
- Written by: Rajan Kathet; Sunir Pandey
- Produced by: Rajan Kathet; Sunir Pandey; Gary Kam Byung-Seok; Cristina Hanes; Isabella Rinaldi
- Starring: Ratima Bishwokarma; Kalima Bishwokarma
- Cinematography: Babin Dulal
- Edited by: Kiran Shrestha; Colorist: Rajendra Moktan
- Music by: Rajan Shrestha (background music); Kishore Acharya (sound design & mixing); Dikesh Khadgi Shahi & Cyrus Tang (sound design)
- Production companies: Salpa Films; Mirror & Story; NoCut Film Collective; 129 Film Company
- Release date: 17 June 2023 (United Kingdom)
- Running time: 79 minutes
- Countries: Nepal; South Korea; Romania
- Language: Nepali

No Winter Holidays: ढोरपाटन is a 2023 Nepalese documentary feature directed by Rajan Kathet and Sunir Pandey. The film is a co-production between Nepal, South Korea and Romania, and completed with the financial support from DMZ Docs Industry and HKIFF (HAF-WIP) Industry. The film had its premiere at the Sheffield DocFest 2023, DMZ Docs 2023, Dharamshala International Film Festival 2023, Taiwan International Documentary Festival 2024, Mumbai International Film Festival 2024, Golden Apricot Yerevan International Film Festival 2024, along with over two dozen other festivals.

== Production ==
No Winter Holidays was filmed in Dhorpatan, Nepal from 2019 to 2020.

== Release ==
The film had its world premiere at the Sheffield DocFest, United Kingdom on 17 June 2023. The Asian premiere of the film was held at DMZ International Documentary Film Festival 2023, South Korea. It was also screened at the Yerevan International Film Festival, Armenia on 11 and 12 July 2024. It was screened on 7 February 2025 at the 2nd Eikhoigi Imphal International Film Festival in the International Competition: Non-Fiction strand.

== Reception ==
The film was reviewed by Priyanka Dasgupta of Times of India, Monika Thapa of The Spotlight, Santanu Das of Hindustan Times, and Prasun Sangroula of Online Khabar.

== Accolades ==
Festival	Award	Result	Ref.
Alternativa Film Awards 2023	NATIVA Award	Won	
Mumbai International Film Festival 2024	Best Cinematography (Winner: Babin Dulal)	Won	
11th Nepal Human Rights International Film Festival 2023	Best Feature Film	Won	
Lima Alterna International Film Festival 2023	Honorable Mention	Won	
Nepal America International Film Festival 2024	Best Feature Documentary	Won	
DokuBaku International Documentary Film Festival 2024	Special Mention	Won	
OKO International Ethnographic Film Festival 2024	Jury Grand Prize	Nominated	
Sheffield DocFest 2023	Grand Jury Award	Nominated	
DMZ International Documentary Film Festival 2023	White Goose Award	Nominated	
22nd Golden Apricot Yerevan International Film Festival 2024	Golden Apricot Award	Nominated	
Taiwan International Documentary Festival 2024	Grand Prize (Asian Vision Competition)	Nominated	
