= Gayathri Prabhu =

Indian writer

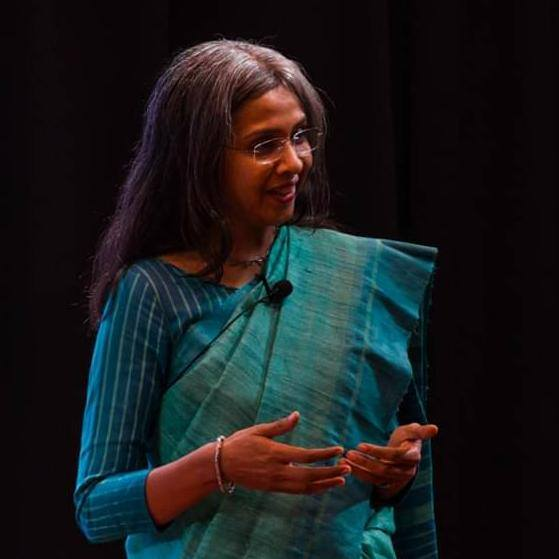
- Prabhu's talk at TedX Manipal on 24 Feb, 2019
- Born: 1974 (age 51–52)
- Writing career
- Years active: 2003 – present
- Genres: Novel, Memoir
- Subject: Fiction
- Website: gayathriprabhu.com

Gayathri Prabhu (born 1974) is an Indian novelist and scholar who currently lives in Manipal, Karnataka. Her recent fictional work consists of the novella Love in Seven Easy Steps (2021), preceded by Vetaal and Vikram: Riddles of the Undead, published by HarperCollins in 2019. Prabhu's recent academic work is a monograph titled A Genre of Her Own (2025).

== Education and academic career ==
Prabhu holds an MA degree in Mass Communication from Mass Communication Research Centre, Jamia Millia Islamia, New Delhi, an MPhil in Creative Writing from Swansea University in the United Kingdom and a PhD in English from the University of Nebraska–Lincoln in the United States. She has published on literary studies and presently teaches at the Manipal Centre for Humanities, Manipal Academy of Higher Education (MAHE).

Prabhu was the Dr TMA Pai Chair in Indian Literature at the Manipal Academy of Higher Education for 2017–2019.

Prabhu is engaged in mental health advocacy work at her university and is the Coordinator of the Student Support Centre (SSC), a pioneering psychotherapy venture designed exclusively for students. The SSC, featured in The Hindu, is the first-of-its kind in India for university students at MAHE, aimed at creating a safe space with confidentiality and free psychotherapeutic supports.

== Fiction ==
Gayathri Prabhu is the author of four novels Vetaal and Vikram: Riddles of the Undead (HarperCollins, 2019), The Untitled (Fourth Estate, HarperCollins, 2016), Birdswim Fishfly (Rupa Publications, 2006), and Maya (Indialog Publications, 2003). Her latest novella titled Love in Seven Easy Steps was released on February 18, 2021. It is a promising work of prose poetry "that celebrates the ways in which love charms, defies and lingers in us." Love in Seven Easy Steps is the first book to be released by an independent publishing house, Magic Mongrel Publishers, which specializes in unconventional narratives in literary fiction. Prabhu's articles in Scroll magazine reflect on how typing out ideas on her phone changed the form of this novella, thinking about the process of writing, and on what it means to write of love in a time of global and national turbulence.

A playful retelling of India's most celebrated cycle of stories, Vetaal and Vikram was published by HarperCollins India in October 2019. The narrative of King Vikram and the Vetaal is originally found in the Kathasaritsagara, an eleventh-century Sanskrit text. The Vetaal is neither alive nor dead, but a consummate storyteller who enthralls his listener, King Vikram. King Vikram can neither speak nor remain silent, according to the conditions set by Vetaal in this narrative cycle. In 1870, eleven of the Vetaal's stories were adapted to English by the famed scholar-explorer Richard Francis Burton. Prabhu's Vetaal and Vikram is a contemporary, inventive work that plays with form while including Burton within its storytelling folds. It challenges the narrative possibilities of a retelling, implicating the reader within the text. Widely read and reviewed, Vetaal and Vikram balances the nostalgic with the present, promising something new and challenging for every reader.

The Untitled, published in 2016 by Fourth Estate, HarperCollins India, was researched and written over a decade and across three continents. It is a novel about the coming together of Indian and Western painting traditions, against the background of the dramatic war of 1799, when the British defeated Tipu Sultan, and finally established unchallenged supremacy in the Indian sub-continent. The Wire described The Untitled as an imaginative break from the themes that have animated historical fiction in India for over a century now, namely "the temptation to be intimate with the monumental." The Huffington Post review called the prose "supple and sublime" and termed the novel as "an allegory of how art and politics cannot remain insulated from one another." The Times Lit Fest in December, 2016 had a session devoted to the novel. The Untitled has also been featured in The Times of India, The Hindu, The Telegraph, The Tribune, Sakal Times, and the Deccan Herald.

The whimsical and inventive novel Birdswim Fishfly (published in 2006) was an exploration of adolescence, family secrets, and the quickening of the artistic temperament. Prabhu's first novel, Maya, published in 2003, was set in the Konkan region and drew from local and family lore as they emerged in the consciousness of a young, questioning girl. The novel was described by the Deccan Herald as “a grippingly haunting tale.”

== Memoir ==
Prabhu's lyrical memoir If I Had to Tell It Again, published by HarperCollins, was released in November 2017. It is written in the aftermath of a father's death, and published in the WHO's international year-long campaign on depression. The book opens the silence in Indian families around chronic sadness and addiction, and seeks to move the discourse beyond blame, guilt, and the rhetoric of family honour.

If I Had to Tell It Again received several positive reviews in the months following its publication. Writer, editor, and columnist, Krupa Ge writes in First Post: “Gayathri’s sparkling prose is light, as it meanders artfully conveying memories heavy, laden with emotions”. Poet Arundhathi Subramaniam praises If I Had to Tell it Again “for its mix of candour, poise and urgency in a fiercely loving portrait of a parent” while choosing it among her best reads of the year. Professor of English at Ashoka University, Madhavi Menon describes the memoir as a “daring and brave challenge to our preconceptions both about writing and about depression” in her review titled “Real Fathers in All Their Frailty”, featured in The Wire. Urvashi Bahuguna in The Scroll calls it “a book unlike any other we have seen in India.” The memoir has also been reviewed in The Shrinking Couch, the Indian Journal of Medical Ethics, The Indian Express, The News Minute, Research and Humanities in Medical Education, apart from reviews by independent bloggers, and responses from artists in the form of illustrations. Interviews with Gayathri Prabhu about her memoir, the motivations and the journey of writing, were featured in The Scroll, as well as in the Deccan Chronicle and Asian Age in January 2018.

Prabhu, who has regularly taught a course in Medical Humanities in the Manipal Centre for Humanities, has moved the conversation about mental health, stigma, and silence beyond the classroom, in a piece co-written as a dialogue with a student, Michael Varghese. Published in Scroll in July 2018, the collaborative conversational writing project is about the evening that Michael attempted to end his life, and revisits the transforming experience that followed through conversations with his teacher, Gayathri. Prabhu's recent piece in the Indian Journal of Medical Ethics reflects on “the power of narratives to simultaneously navigate advocacy, teaching, learning, writing and scholarship”, in an article that draws from Prabhu's experience of designing and teaching a medical humanities course in an Indian classroom of literature students. A reflective piece about the reception of the memoir was written by Prabhu and published in The Economic and Political Weekly in Sep 2018, about the challenges of the memoir genre in India, the experience of disclosing sexual abuse in/ to the family, and the author's take on why a public telling matters. In November 2025, Prabhu became a member of the editorial board of BMJ's journal Medical Humanities.

== Scholarly works ==
In 2025, Gayathri Prabhu published A Genre of Her Own: Life Narratives and Feminist Literary Beginnings in Modern India, a pivotal work that explores the forms and aesthetics of early instances of women's writing, revealing a constellation of writings that are central to understanding modern India's early literary landscape. Prabhu examines the intentional and introspective elements of a variety of genres in which women writers were experimenting with the first-person voice, such as pamphlets, letters, travelogues, essays, autobiographies, and novels. The title pays homage to Virginia Woolf's essay, A Room of One's Own (1929), as a way of honouring the many intonations of narrative form that Prabhu explores in her work. The texts examined in A Genre include: "Savitribai Phule's Kavya Phule (1854), Tarabai Shinde's Stri-Purush Tulana (1882), Anandibai Joshee's letters (1883 - 1884), Rukhmabai's "Reply" (1887), Krupabai Satthianadhan's Saguna (1888), Rashsundari Debi's Amar Jiban (1897), Swarnakumari Debi Ghosal's Kahake (1898), Dosebai Cowasjee Jessawalla's The Story of My Life (1911), Binodini Dasi's Amar Katha (1912), and Atiya Fyzee's Zamana-i-Tahsil (1921)." An excerpt in The Scroll sheds light on the alternative history that Prabhu reveals in her work: "For the first time, both personae – I am a writer and I am a woman – were being claimed in the Indian public sphere in a manner that was desirable and exciting, in that it had almost no precedence." Other excerpts have been featured in The Wire. A Genre of Her Own illuminates a variety of narrative motifs that "encompass marriage and motherhood, domestic labour and caretaking, romance and sexuality, public service and intellectual prowess, religious quests and scrambles for livelihood, illness and aging." Uncovering a history and an aesthetics of ingenuity that has been unstudied so far, A Genre of Her Own is a defining contribution to the study of women's writing and the imagination of India's literary history.

In 2020, scholars Gayathri Prabhu and Nikhil Govind co-published Shadow Craft: Visual Aesthetics of Black and White Hindi Cinema through Bloomsbury India. With seventy five rare and curated images from the archives, Shadow Craft offers for the first time a consolidated and intimate journey through the pioneering black and white cinema aesthetic of Hindi mainstream cinema from the years between Indian independence (1947) and the dominance of colour cinema (early 1960s), at its most expressive and climactic moment. Bloomsbury Publishing describes the work as an "ardent and immersive study of cinematic craftings that emblematize the oeuvres of Kamal Amrohi, Raj Kapoor, Nutan, Bimal Roy, Guru Dutt, and Abrar Alvi. Films such as Aag (1948), Mahal (1949), Seema (1955), Pyaasa (1957), Sujata (1959), Kagaz Ke Phool (1959), Sahib Bibi Aur Ghulam (1962), Bandini (1963) remain formative to the visual psyche of generations of South Asian viewers." A review of Shadow Craft comments on the evocative images in the text from the archives, stating that the text takes on the challenge of verbalizing the visual to pull readers back into the frame of the films. The visual language studied in Shadow Craft demonstrates a minutely attuned and sympathetic camera, evocative pools of shadow, affect-rich atmospheric composition, and the visual autonomy of performance.

== Awards and recognition ==
Prabhu won the Vreeland Award at the University of Nebraska–Lincoln for best creative manuscript in 2011. Less than a year after the publication of 'If I Had to Tell it Again', the memoir was longlisted under the category of Best Non Fiction (English) in the Atta Galatta Bangalore Literature Festival in September 2018. Prabhu was shortlisted as one of the five authors for the Sushila Devi Literature Award For 'The Best Book Of Fiction Written By A Woman Author', in English and published in 2016 or 2017.

For her work in the literary field, Prabhu won the R.K. Narayan Award for Best Writer in English in 2019 from the Booksellers and Publishers Association of South India (BAPASI) at the inauguration of the 2019 Chennai Book Fair, handed by the CM of Tamil Nadu.

Prabhu is a winner of the prestigious Charles Wallace Writer's Fellowship (2020), which she held at the University of Stirling. She published a reflection piece on writing in the pandemic in quarantine titled "The writer and her windows", upon her return to India after the fellowship.
