= Aida Mohammadkhani =

Iranian actress (born 1987)

- آیدا محمدخانی
- Born: June 2, 1987 (age 38); Tehran, Iran
- Occupation(s): Actress, neuroscientist
- Years active: 1994 - 1998 / 2012 - present

Aida Mohammadkhani (Persian: آیدا محمدخانی, born June 2, 1987) is an Iranian actress and neuroscientist working in Persian film. She is best known for her portrayal of an innocent child who lost her money on the way to buy goldfish from the market, in the film The White Balloon (1995) directed by Jafar Panahi.

== Early life ==
Mohammadkhani was born in Tehran. She is the second oldest of four siblings.

== Film and television career ==
In 1995 Mohammadkhani made her acting debut in the award-winning film The White Balloon, playing the child protagonist Razieh, a film by Jafar Panahi at the age of seven years. She then acted in Raaz Mina (1996), directed by Abbas Rafei, and another Ebrahim (1998) directed by Hamidreza Mohseni.

Mohammadkhani also worked in the Iranian television serial (Persian: سرزمين سبز) and "Street Rain" (Persian: کوچه های باران).

== Personal life ==
Mohammadkhani received her master's degree in clinical psychology from Alzahra University. She received her PhD in 2018 in Cognitive Neurosciences in the school of cognitive sciences at the Institute for Research in Fundamental Sciences (IPM). Her research focused on the orexin system in opioid addiction. From 2015 to 2017 she was a visiting scholar at Rutgers University in the laboratory of Dr. Gary Aston-Jones. Currently, she is a post-doctoral fellow in the laboratory of Dr. Stephanie Borgland at the Hotchkiss Brain Institute of the University of Calgary.

== Awards and honours ==
- "The Golden Butterfly" award for Best Actress at Isfahan International Festival, Cinema of Iran.
- Judge at Isfahan International Festival - (2002) with Baran Kosari, Reza Davood Nejad, Shahed Ahmadloo, Mehdi Bagherbeigi
- Judge at International Fair Festival Iran - (2009) The White Balloon
- Caméra d'or - 1995 at Cannes Film Festival
- Gold Award - 1995 at Tokyo International Film Festival
- Best International Film - 1995 at Sudbury Cinéfest
- International Jury Award - 1995 at São Paulo International Film Festival
