= Nepal International Film Festival =

Annual film festival in Nepal

- Location: Kathmandu, Nepal
- Festival date: April
- Website: niff.org.np

Nepal International Film Festival (NIFF) is an annual film festival in Nepal. The festival was started in 2018. The most recent iteration was held between 02 April 2026 to 06 April 2026, it was the 9th iteration of NIFF.

== Awards ==
| Awards | 2018 | 2020 | 2021 |
|---|---|---|---|
| Gautam Buddha Award for Best Feature Film | | Trap (Turkey) | Dictionary |
| Mt. Everest Award for Best Documentary Film | | Co-Husband (Nepal) | Return to the Lost Eden |
| Jury's Choice Award for the Best International Feature Film | | The Other Half (Sri Lanka) | |
| IFFS Don Quixote Award | | | In My Dream |
| Award for The Best Film in the Pandemic Film Exhibit | | | Civil Soldiers |
| Manjushree Award for the Best Animated Short Film | | Spirit of the Drowning Girls (China) | Überfrog |
| Bagmati Award for the Best Live Action Short Film | | Nooreh (India) | God's Daughter Dances’ |
| National Award for the Best Feature Film | | Bulbul (Nepal) | Ama Khando |
| Jury's Choice Award for the Best National Feature Film | | Gopi (Nepal) | |
| National Award for the Best Short Film | | Kalam (Nepal) | A Scarecrow |
