= Kantira =

- village
- Location in Odisha, India Kantira (India)
- Coordinates: 20.8693°N 85.9126°E
- Country: India
- State: Odisha
- District: Jajpur

Area
  - Total: 2.150 km^{2} (0.830 sq mi)

Population (2011)
  - Total: 1,448
- Time zone: UTC+5:30 (IST)
- literacy rate: 70.29
- Sex ratio: 1.15

Kantira is a village in Jajpur district of Odisha, India.

== Demographics ==
According to the 2011 Census of India, Kantira had a population of 1,448, of which 750 were males and 698 were females. Population within the age group of 0 to 6 years was 196. The total number of literates in Kantira was 880, which constituted 70.29% of the population with male literacy of 80.50% and female literacy of 59.57%. The Scheduled Castes and Scheduled Tribes population under India's system of positive discrimination was 1,311 and 0 respectively. Kantira had 283 households in 2011.
