= Kolkata International Film Festival =

Indian annual film festival held in Kolkata, West Bengal

Coordinates: 22°34′11″N 88°22′11″E

- Official logo of the KIFF
- Location: Kolkata, India
- Founded: 1995
- Most recent: 2025
- Awards: Golden Royal Bengal Tiger, Silver Royal Bengal Tiger
- Hosted by: Information and Cultural Affairs Department, Government of West Bengal
- Festival date: November/December
- Language: International
- Website: kiff.in

Current: 31st
- 32nd 30th

The Kolkata International Film Festival (KIFF) is an annual film festival held in Kolkata, India. Founded in 1995, it is the third oldest international film festival in India. The festival is organized by the West Bengal Film Centre under the West Bengal Government. In 2019, it was held from 8 November to 15 November. In 2024 the inaugural ceremony of the Kolkata International Film Festival will take place on 4 December and will continue up to 11 December 2024.The 30th Kolkata International Film Festival began on 4 December 2024 at Dhanadhanya Auditorium, in Kolkata, India. A 1966 Bengali film Galpo Holeo Satti by Tapan Sinha opened the festival

Duration will be not less than 60 minutes for featured films. The length of short films must be not more than 30 minutes, and for documentaries not more than 60 minutes. Productions may not be older than two years and must be an Indian premiere.

== Awards ==
1. Innovation in Moving Images (IMI) - Golden Royal Bengal Tiger Award for Best Film, Best Director, Special Jury Mention
2. FIPRESCI Award in Innovation in Moving Images (IMI)
3. Competition on Indian Language's Films - Best Film, Best Director, Special Jury
4. Bengali Panorama - Best Film
5. Asian Select (NETPAC Award) - Best Film
6. Competition on Indian Short Films - Best Film, Special Jury
7. Competition on Indian Documentary Films - Best Film, Special Jury

== Awards ceremonies ==
The following is a listing of all Kolkata International Film Awards ceremonies since 1995.

Ceremony	IMI : Golden Royal Bengal Tiger Award for Best Film	IMI : Best Director	IMI : Special Jury Mention	IMI : FIPRESCI Award for International Competition	Competition on Indian Language’s Films : Hiralal Sen Memorial Award for Best Film	Competition on Indian Language’s Films : Best Director	Competition on Indian Language’s Films : Special Jury Mention	Asian Select - NETPAC award : Best Film	Bengali Panorama : Best Film	Sources
23rd Kolkata International Film Festival (2017)	Los Perros by Marcela Said	Ása Hjörleifsdóttir for The Swan	Kupal by Kazem Mollaie & Birds Are Singing in Kigali by Joanna Kos-Krauze, Krzysztof Krauze		To Let by Chezhian Ra	Dr. Bijukumar Damodaran for Sound of Silence	Pathumma by Panchakshari	Goodbye Katmandu		
24th Kolkata International Film Festival (2018)	The Third Wife by Ash Mayfair	Abu Bakr Shawky for Yomeddine	Tarikh by Churni Ganguly		Widow of Silence by Praveen Morchhale	Arijit Biswas for Sun Goes Around the Earth	Kedara			
25th Kolkata International Film Festival (2019)	La llorona by Jayro Bustamante	Václav Marhoul for The Painted Bird	Aga's House by Lendita Zeqiraj		Mai Ghat: Crime No 103/2005 by Ananth Narayan Mahadevan	Indrasis Acharya for The Parcel	Run Kalyani	Devi aur Hero		
26th Kolkata International Film Festival (2021)	Bander Band by Manijeh Hekmat	Artykpai Suiundukov for Shambala	Blindfold by Taras Dron		Kalla Nottam by Rahul Riji Nair	Biswajit Bora for God On The Balcony		Nonajoler Kabbo		
27th Kolkata International Film Festival (2022)	Jhilli by Ishaan Ghose	Ola Jankowska for Anatomia	Streams by Mehdi Hmili		Adieu Godard by Amartya Bhattacharyya	Ishrat R Khan for Guthlee Ladoo		The Cloud and the Man		
28th Kolkata International Film Festival (2022)	Upon Entry by Alejandro Rojas, Juan Sebastián Vásquez & The Golden Wings of Watercocksby Muhammad Quayum	Ernesto Ardito & Virna Molina for Hitler's Witch	Silent Glory by Nahid Hassanzadeh		Muthayya by Bhaskhar Maurya	Deepankar Prakash for Naanera	The Terrace by Indrani Chakraborty & If Only Trees Could Talk by Dr. Bobby Sarma Baruah	Fortune by Mujaheddin Muzaffar		
29th Kolkata International Film Festival (2023)	Children of Nobody by Erez Tadmor	Carlos Daniele Malave for One Way	Chalchitra Ekhon (Kaleidoscope Now) by Anjan Dutt		Wild Swans by Rajni Basumatary	Shonet Anthony Barretto for Avni Ki Kismat	Joseph's Son by Haobam Paban Kumar	Broken Dreams: Stories from the Myanmar Coup by Nay Ni Hlaing Ka, L Minpyae Mon, Myat Noe, Bo Thet Tun, Nay Chi Myat Noe Wint	Mon Potongo by Rajdeep Paul, Sarmistha Maiti	
30th Kolkata International Film Festival (2024)	Tarika by Milko Lazarov	Ana Endara for Beloved Tropic	Dead Man's Switch by Alejandro Gerber Bicecci	Tarika by Milko Lazarov	Lacchi by Krishne Gowda	Aaryan Chandra Prakash for Aājoor	Nukkad Naatak (A Street Play) by Tanmaya Shekhar	Putulnama by Ranajit Ray	Dhrubor Aschorjo Jibon by Abhijit Chowdhury	
31st Kolkata International Film Festival (2025)	To the West, in Zapata by David Bim	Lalith Rathnayake for Riverstone	Beautiful Evening, Beautiful Day by Ivona Juko	To the West, in Zapata by David Bim	Shape of Momo by Tribeni Rai	Pradip Kurbah for The Elysian Field	Kangbo Aloti by Khanjan Kishore Nath	Victoria by Sivaranjini J	Porshi by Chandrasish Ray	
