= Amrit Pritam =

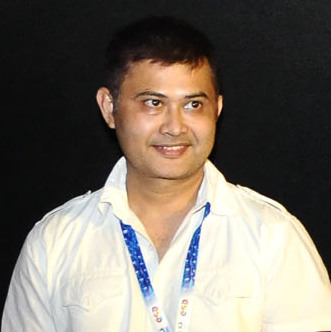
- Amrit Pritam in 2017
- Born: 4 November 1975 (age 50); Jorhat, Assam
- Education: Dr. Bhupen Hazarika Regional Government Film and Television Institute
- Occupation: Sound Designer
- Spouse: Gopa Bezboruah
- Writing career
- Years active: 2002 - present
- Notable awards: Motion Picture Sound Editors Award; Producers Guild Award; Assam, Maharashtra, and Goa State Film Awards; and National Film Award.

Amrit Pritam is a sound designer. He is the recipient along with Resul Pookutty of a Motion Picture Sound Editors Golden Reel Award and two Producers Guild of India – Apsara Awards Additionally, Pritam has been conferred with awards by the state governments of Assam, Goa, and Maharashtra.

He has served on several notable film juries, including the House of Illusions jury at the Chalachitram National Film Festival, the Assam State Film Awards, and the Goa State Film Awards.

== Early life ==
Amrit Pritam was born on 4 November 1975, in Jorhat town, Assam. He graduated in Physics from JB College, Jorhat, in 1998. And then did a 3-year Sound Engineering course at the Dr. Bhupen Hazarika Regional Government Film and Television Institute, Guwahati, Assam. Following his education, he moved to Mumbai in 2002 and started working in films, initially, as a FX Foley tracklayer, dialogue cleaner, pre-mixer, production mixer, and sound editor.

== Film studies ==
Amrit Pritam has served on the Academic council of the film Studies dept. of JB College, Jorhat, Assam; and has conducted film workshops and classes at film festivals such as SIFFCY and educational venues such as Guwahati University, Cotton University, Tezpur University, and the Film and Television Institute of India. He plans to someday set up a school dedicated to teaching the art of sound in cinema.

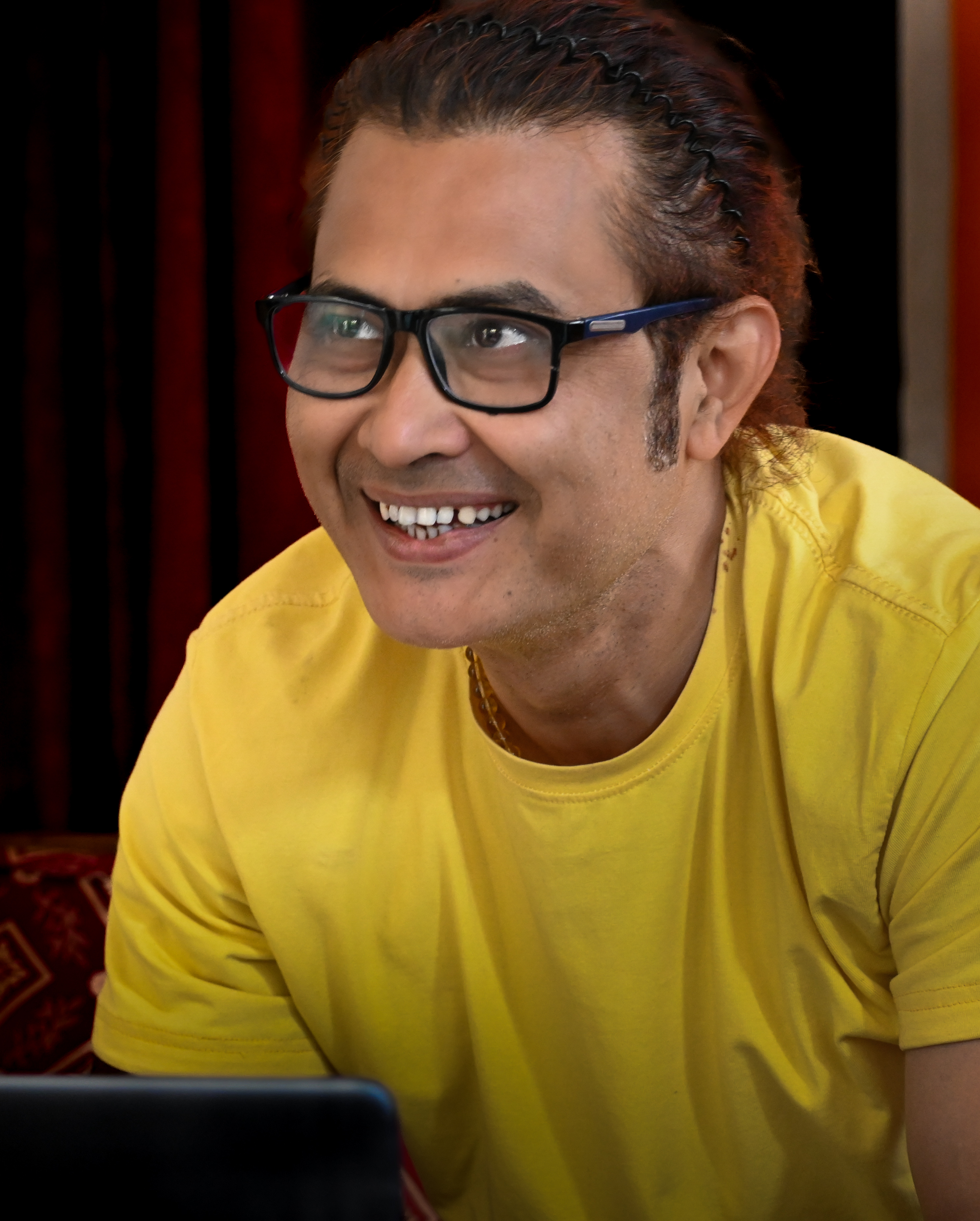
Amrit Pritam at his home in Jorhat, Assam in 2025

== Filmography ==
Pritam worked closely with Resul Pookutty in Slumdog Millionaire directed by Danny Boyle.

Year	Film	Credited as				Notes
Year	Film	Sound Editor	Sound Designer	Supervising Sound Editor	Other	Notes
2022	Music School		Yes			
2021	Sikaisal		Yes	Yes	Re Recording Mixer	
2021	Chehre		Yes	Yes		
2021	Dial 100		Yes	Yes		
2021	Mumbai Saga		Yes	Yes		
2020	Semkhor		Yes	Yes	Re Recording Mixer	
2020	Bridge		Yes	Yes	Re Recording Mixer	
2019	Jwlwi - the Seed		Yes	Yes	Re Recording Mixer	
2019	Lewduh		Yes			
2019	Oththa Seruppu Size 7		Yes			
2019	Pal Pal Dil Ke Paas		Yes	Yes		
2019	Kaaneen: a Secret Search		Yes			
2019	Bohubritta		Yes		Music Director	
2018	Love Sonia	Yes	Yes	Yes		
2018	Aasma	Yes	Yes	Yes		
2018	The Rainbow Field	Yes	Yes	Yes		
2018	Mishing				Re Recording Mixer	
2018	2.0		Yes	Yes		
2018	Rainbow Fields		Yes	Yes		
2018	Zoo		Yes	Yes		
2018	Bhoga Khirikee		Yes	Yes		
2018	Praana		Yes			
2017	Kaabil	Yes	Yes	Yes		
2017	Beautiful Lives	Yes	Yes	Yes		
2017	Ishu	Yes	Yes	Yes		
2017	Bioscopewala		Yes			
2017	Village Rockstars		Yes		Re Recording Mixer	
2016	Remo	Yes	Yes	Yes		
2016	Niruttara	Yes	Yes	Yes		
2016	Borhxaranya		Yes	Yes	Re Recording Mixer	
2016	Man with the Binoculars		Yes			
2016	Satyavati		Yes			
2015	Jazba	Yes	Yes	Yes		
2015	Lukka Chuppi	Yes	Yes	Yes		
2015	Pathemari	Yes	Yes	Yes		
2015	Gaur Hari Dastaan	Yes	Yes	Yes		
2015	India's Daughter		Yes			
2014	PK	Yes	Yes	Yes		
2014	Kick	Yes	Yes	Yes		
2014	Highway	Yes	Yes	Yes		
2014	Court	Yes	Yes	Yes		
2014	Margarita with a Straw	Yes	Yes	Yes		
2014	Nagrik	Yes	Yes	Yes		
2014	Rainy Day	Yes	Yes	Yes		
2014	Minugurulu - The Fireflies		Yes	Yes		
2014	Gandhi of the Month		Yes	Yes		
2014	Rodor Sithi		Yes			
2014	Roar		Yes	Yes		
2014	One Last Question		Yes			
2014	Kochadaiiyaan		Yes	Yes		
2013	Aakhon Dekhi	Yes	Yes	Yes		
2013	Sniffer	Yes	Yes	Yes		
2013	Warning	Yes	Yes	Yes		
2013	Kunjanandante Kada	Yes	Yes	Yes		
2013	The Good Road	Yes	Yes	Yes		
2013	Shoot Out at Wadala	Yes	Yes	Yes		
2012	Oass	Yes	Yes	Yes		
2012	English Vinglish	Yes	Yes	Yes		
2012	Chittagong		Yes			
2012	3	Yes	Yes	Yes		
2012	Nanban	Yes	Yes	Yes		
2012	Fatso	Yes	Yes	Yes		
2012	Liv & Ingmar		Yes			
2011	Ra.One	Yes	Yes	Yes		
2011	A Decent Arrangement	Yes				
2011	Havai Dada	Yes				
2010	Endhiran — the Robot	Yes	Yes	Yes		
2010	Prince	Yes	Yes	Yes		
2010	Pappu Can't Dance Sala	Yes	Yes	Yes		
2010	Walk Away	Yes	Yes	Yes		
2010	Khichdi	Yes				
2010	I'm 24	Yes				
2010	10ml Love		Yes			
2009	Blue	Yes	Yes	Yes		
2009	Pazhashi Raja	Yes	Yes	Yes		
2009	The President is Coming	Yes				
2009	Raat Gayee Baat Gayee	Yes				
2009	The Fakir of Venice	Yes				
2008	Ghajini	Yes	Yes	Yes		
2008	Slumdog Millionaire				Production Mixer	
2008	Mithya	Yes				
2007	Gandhi My Father	Yes				
2007	Sawariya	Yes				
2007	Manorama Six Feet Under	Yes				
2007	Salam-e-Ishq	Yes			Dialogue editing and sound design	
2006	Omkara	Yes				
2006	Zinda	Yes			FX Foley track laying and premixing	
2006	Shikar	Yes				
2006	Mixed Doubles	Yes			Tracklaying of sound FX & premixing	
2006	Sacred Evil	Yes				
2006	Bombay Skies	Yes				
2005	15th Park Avenue	Yes			Tracklaying of sound FX & editing	
2005	Black	Yes				
2005	Mangal Pandey	Yes			Track laying of sound FX & sound editing	
2005	Bluffmaster!	Yes				
2005	My Wife's Murder	Yes			Dialogue cleaning, tracklaying & premixing	
2005	Amu	Yes				
2005	Dreaming Lasha	Yes			Production Mixing and Sound Editing	
2005	Missed Call	Yes			Dialogue Editing and Sound Editing	
2005	Parzania	Yes			Dialogue Editing And Sound Editing	
2004	King Of Bollywood	Yes				
2004	Musafir	Yes				
2004	American Daylight	Yes				
2004	Masti	Yes				
2004	Ab Tak Chhappan	Yes				
2004	Ek Hassina Thi	Yes				
2004	Kyun! Ho Gaya Na...	Yes				
2003	Maqbool	Yes				
2003	Mathrubhumi	Yes				
2003	Boom	Yes				
2003	Kaal Ho Naa Ho				Production Mixer	

== Awards ==
Year	Festival/organisation	Award	Category	Film	Result	Shared with	Ref
2019	Motion Picture Sound Editors	Golden Reel Award	Best Sound	2.0	Nominated		
2018	Govt. of Assam	State Film Award	Best Sound Design	Village Rockstar	Won		
2018	Prag Cine Award	Prag Cine Award	Best Sound Design	Village Rockstar & Ishu	Won		
2017	Prag Cine Award	Prag Cine Award	Best Sound Design	Antardristi & the Beautiful Lives	Won		
2016	Prag Cine Award	Prag Cine Award	Best Sound Design	Rodor Sithi	Won		
2016	Motion Picture Sound Editors	Golden Reel Award	Best Sound	India's Daughter	Won	Resul Pookutty	
2016	Motion Picture Sound Editors	Golden Reel Award	Best Sound	India's Daughter	Nominated		
2016	Motion Picture Sound Editors	Golden Reel Award	Best Sound	Unfreedom	Nominated		
2015	Zee TV — Marathi	Gaurav Award	Best Sound Design	A Rainy Day	Won		
2015	Prabhat Puraskar — Pune	Prabhat Puraskar Award	Best Sound Design	A Rainy Day	Won		
2015	Doordarshan - Mumbai	Sahayadri Cine Award	Best Sound Design	A Rainy Day	Won		
2015	Prabhat Puraskar Pune	Prabhat Puraskar Award	Best Sound Design	Nagrik	Won		
2015	Motion Picture Sound Editors	Golden Reel Award	Best Sound	Roar – The Tiger of Sunderban	Nominated		
2015	Filmfare	Filmfare Award Marathi	Best Sound Design	Nagrik	Nominated		
2014	Govt. of Maharashtra	Maharasthra State Film Award	Best Sound Design	A Rainy Day	Won		
2014	Govt. of Goa	State Film Award	Best Sound Design	A Rainy Day	Won		
2014	Filmfare	Filmfare Award	Best Sound Design	Highway	Nominated		
2012	Zee Entertainment	Zee Cine Award	Best Sound Design	Ra.One	Won	Resul Pookutty	
2012	International Indian Film Academy	IIFA Technical Excellence Award	Best Sound Design	Ra.One	Won	Resul Pookutty	
2012	Producers Guild of India	Apsara Award	Best Sound Design	Ra.One	Won	Resul Pookutty	
2012	Filmfare	Filmfare Award	Best Sound Design	Ra-One	Nominated	Resul Pookutty	
2010	Govt. of India	National Film Award	Best Sound Design	Kerala Verma Pazashi Raja	Won	Resul Pookutty	
2009	International Indian Film Academy	IIFA Technical Excellence Award	Best Sound Design	Ghajini	Won	Resul Pookutty	
2009	Association of Malayalam Movie Artists	Amma Award	Best Sound Design	Pazhashi Raja	Won	Resul Pookutty	
2009	Producers Guild of India	Apsara Award	Best Sound Design	Blue	Won	Resul Pookutty	
2009	Star India	Star Screen Award	Best Sound Design	Ghajini	Nominated	Resul Pookutty	
