= Monita Borgohain =

Indian festival director

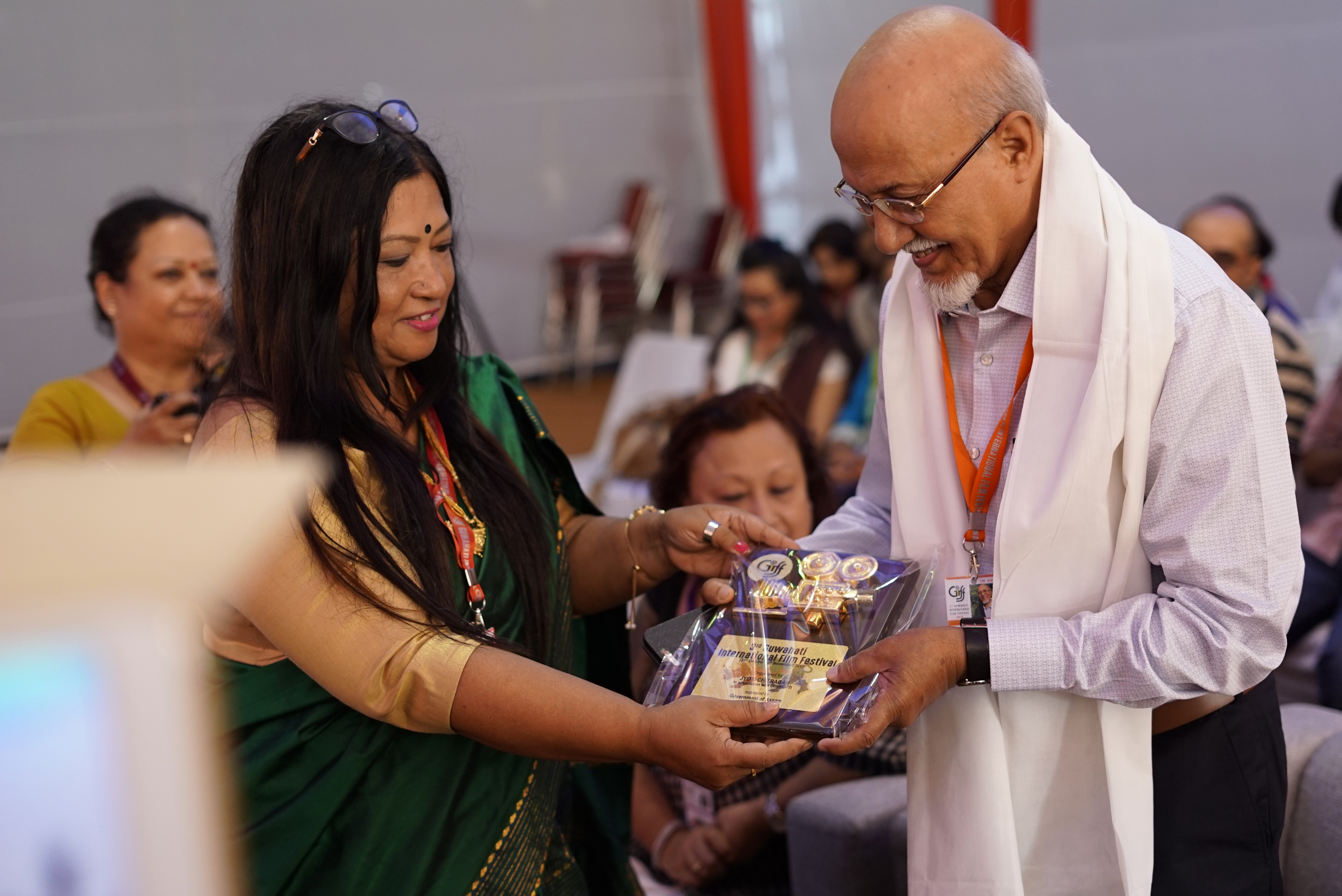
- Festival Director Monita Borgohain felicitates film critic Apurba Sarma at the 3rd Guwahati International Film Festival

Monita Borgohain, IAS, is the Secretary to the Govt. of Assam, Director of the Dr. Bhupen Hazarika Regional Government Film and Television Institute, Secretary of the Jyoti Chitraban Film Studio, Festival Director of the Guwahati International Film Festival, and Producer of the feature film Xobdo Nixobdo Kolahol (Soul of Silence). Occasionally, she writes for journals, such as the Film Critics Circle of India Journal of Indian Cinema and the FIPRESCI-India journal. She is the festival director of Guwahati Asian Film Festival.

== Govt. of Assam ==
Monita Borgohain, IAS, studied Political Geography at Guwahati University. In May 2020, she was one of 25 Assam Civil Service officers of the 1992 and 1993 batches who were promoted with a selection grade. In Feb 2022, she was promoted from the post of Joint Secretary to the Govt. of Assam, Cultural Affairs Department, to the rank of Secretary to the Govt. of Assam, Administrative Reforms and Training, Pension and Public Grievances. In June 2023, Borgohain, along with 10 others from Assam, was promoted to the Indian Administrative Service (IAS) rank by the Govt. of India.

== Film Festival Circuit ==
Year/s	Role	Festival	References
2017	Festival Director	1st Guwahati International Film Festival	
2018	Festival Director	2nd Guwahati International Film Festival	
2019	Festival Director	3rd Guwahati International Film Festival	
2020	Jury Member	4th Chalachitram National Film Festival	
2020	Jury Member	4th Kautik International Film Festival	
2021	Jury Member	5th Kautik International Film Festival	
2021	Preview Committee Member	1st Chicago International Indie Film Festival	
2022	Film Producer	Xobdo-Nixobdo-Kolahol /Soul of Silence	
