= Baharul Islam (actor) =

Indian theatre/film actor & director

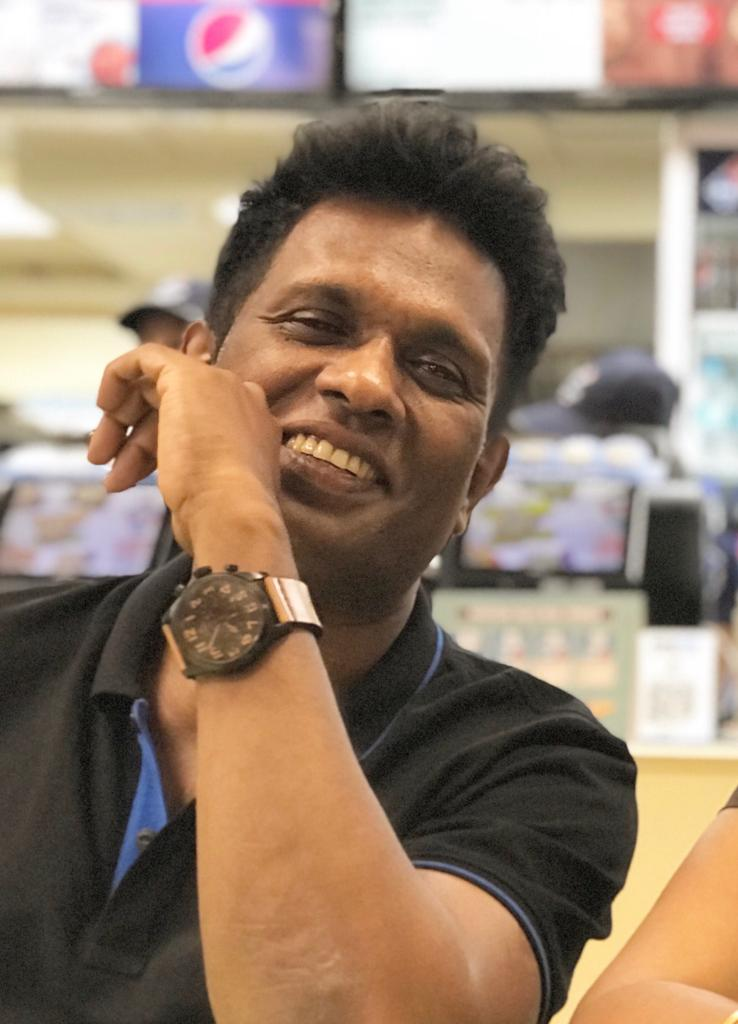
- Born: Goalpara, Assam, India
- Occupations: Actor, theatre artist, director
- Spouse: Bhagirathi Bai Kadam
- Website: www.baharulislam.com

Baharul Islam is an Indian theater actor and alumnus of the National School of Drama, which he joined in 1987. He has acted in more than 80 plays and has designed and directed 30 plays for his theater troupe Seagull. He works as a film actor in Assamese and Hindi cinema.

== Personal life ==
Baharul Islam is married to Bhagirathi Bai Kadam, who is also an alumnus of NSD. They have two daughters.

== Career ==
He started his career with theater in Assam and soon rose to prominence in India and abroad. In 1992–93 he joined the Tara Arts Group of London as an actor for the production of the play Heer Ranjha. The play rehearsed in London and thereafter extensively toured UK and Japan. Baharul learned theater music from B V Karanth and Bhaskar Chandervakar, respectively. His first movie was Aasene Kunuba Hiyat and latest was Rodor Sithi.

He has directed and played in almost 80 Assamese plays, including Jatra. Also designed and directed almost 30 plays for his own theater troupe, Seagull. He has four years experience in commercial mobile theatre (Bhramyaman) in Assam as an actor.

He has also written and published four books: Akanto Monere, Simar Sipare, Beyond the Obvious, and Khiriki Khuliyei, all of which were published by Seagull Theatre's publication wing.

== Awards and recognition ==
He received the 2005 Manohar Singh Award instituted by the National School of Drama for path-breaking work in theater.

- Sanskriti Samman from Eka ebong koekjon publication, Guwahati,
- Natyaprobor Award from Sharadakanta Bordoloi smriti committee, Nowgaon in 2011.
- Bishnu Basu Smriti Samman by Bratyajon theatre, Kolkata in 2012.
- Badal Sircar Rang Ratan Award 2015 from FACT Rang Mahoul Begusarai, Bihar.
- Harishankar Parsai Rashtriya Rang Samman 2016 by Vibechana Rang Mandal, Jabbalpur, MP
- Habib Tanvir Ras Rang Samman 2016 from Ras Kala Manch ROHTAK
- Natyaratna Ugra Mena Award 2017 from Ankuran Assam
- Natasurya Phani Sharma National Award 2017 from National Performing Art Association of India.

== Bibliography ==
He has so far acted in more than fifty plays and designed and directed many plays.

=== Acting ===
Before joining National School of Drama in 1987

- Panimolar biya directed by Khirod Choudhury
- Opokendrik directed by Karuna Deka
- Ghorapaak by Karuna Deka
- Pragya by Karuna Deka
- Infra Radio scope by Karuna Deka
- Ankur by Amulya Kakati
- Arya by jayanta Kumar Das
- Morubhumi by Karuna Deka
- Mamore dhora toruwal by Dulal Roy
- Holi by Nayan Prasad
- Ulanga Roja by Abdul Majid
- Dhoraloi jidina namibo horog by Pulakesh Chetia
- Geleleo by Bipin das
- A solo Swadhin by Khirod Choudhury
- Patharughat by Debesh Sarma
- Maharaja By Sanjeev Hazarika
- Pagala phatek by Abdul Majid
- Peperar Prem by Subheswar Das

During National School of drama (1987–1990)

- Paanch choronka vesh by Jaydev Hattangadi
- The Seagull by Ram Gopal Bajaj
- The Untouchable by Cristine Landon Smith
- Sohrab Rustom by D R Ankur
- Father by Prasanna
- Chankya vishnugupta by Satyadev Dube
- Khisiyani Billi by Barry John
- Twelve night by Fritz Bennewitz
- Nal damayanti by B V Karanth
- Comred ka coat by Sanjay Upadhaya
- Nayak khalnayak vidushak Yogesh Pant
- Bhaloo by Naresh Chander Lal
- Miss Julie by Limbajee Bhiwajee
- Terekuttu

After NSD (1990 to 2019)

- Abhimonnyu (own direction)
- Guwahati Guwahati (own direction)
- Gadha Nritya by Bhagirathi Bai Kadam
- Jatra by (own direction)
- Nibaran bhattacharya (own direction)
- Agnigarh by Anup Hazarika
- Five tons of love (own direction)
- Hansini (own direction)
- Akash by (own direction)
- Swabhav by (own direction)
- Ram Shyam Jadu (own direction)
- Mechbath by Bhagirathi Bai Kadam
- Julius Caesar by Bhagirathi Bai Kadam
- Hattamelar hipare (own direction)
- Parashuram by Parag Sarma
- Court Marshal (own direction)
- Madhyabartini (own direction)
- The Green Serpent (own direction)
- Saraighat (own direction)
- Simar sipare (own direction)
- Uttaradhikar by Bhagirathi Bai Kadam
- Garh by (own direction)
- Miss Julie (own direction)

=== Play design and direction ===
- Ram Shyam Jadu playwright by Badal Sircar & translated by Nayan Prasad
- Ankur playwright by Amulya Kakati
- Urukha playwright by Karuna Deka
- Abhimanyu playwright by Karuna Deka
- Sarishrip playwright by Karuna Deka
- Saraighat playwright by Karuna Deka
- Yayati playwright by Girish Karnad, translated by Naren Hazarika
- Guwahati Guwahati playwright by Mahendra Borthakur
- Holi playwright by Mahesh Elkunchwar
- Patasara playwright by Novel: Naba Kanta Baruah Dramatized by: Karuna Deka
- Anurati Maya (Hindi) playwright by Based on The Seagull, Anton Chekhov
- Who is Afraid of Virginia Wolf (Hindi) playwright by Edward Albee
- Bagia Bancharam (Hindi) playwright by Manoj Mitra
- Seagull (Kannada) playwright by Anton Chekhov
- Kit playwright by Dr. Shyama Prasad Sarma
- Baligharar Alahi playwright by Based on the play ‘ King Lear’ William Shakespeare Translated by Mahendra Borthakur
- Hey Mahanagar playwright by Mahendra Borthakur
- Pabitra Paapi (Oedipus) playwright by Sophocles Translated by Sewabrata Baruah
- Prem playwright by Mahendra Borthakur
- Gundaraj playwright by Champak Sarma
- Tajyaputra playwright by Mahesh Kalita
- Apekshya playwright by Novel: Mamani Raisom Goswami, Dramatized by Baharul Islam
- Jatra playwright by Story Imram Hussain, Dramatized by Baharul Islam
- Kashmeer Kumari playwright by Ganesh Gogoi
- Ujir Mangala (Puntila and his man Matti) playwright by Bertolt Brecth Adapted by Naren Patgiri
- Akash (Assamese/ Hindi) playwright by Dr Bhabendra Nath Saikia, Baharul Islam
- Edal Seujia Saap playwright by Dr. Dhruba Jyoti Bora, Baharul Islam
- Simar Sipare playwright by Baharul Islam
- Hatta Melar Sipare playwright by Badal Sircar, Translated by Nayan Prasad
- Seagull playwright by Anton Chekhov
- Hanseeni playwright by Novel: Naba Kanta Baruah, Dramatized by Karuna Deka
- Five tons of Love playwright by Anton Chekhov
- Patasara playwright by Novel: Naba Kanta Baruah, Dramatized by Karuna Deka
- Garh (The Rhinoceros) playwright by Eugene Ionesco Translated by Karuna Deka
- Sri Nibaran Bhattacharya playwright by Arun Sarma
- Moi Premar Pinjarat Bandi playwright by Bipulananda Choudhury
- Miss Julie playwright by Augustus Strindberg Translated by Baharul Islam
- Agni Aur Barkha playwright by Girish Karnad Translated by Amulya Kumar jointly directed by Baharul Islam & Bhagirathi
- Madhyabartini (Assamese/Hindi) playwright by Rabindranath Tagore dramatisation by Naren Patgiri/ Baharul
- Court Marshal playwright by Swaraj Deepak, Translated by Nayan Prasad
- Pana Gaoar Tupat Enisha playwright by Baharul Islam
- Labhita playwright by Jyoti Prasad Agarwala
- Buddhuram playwright by B V Karanth Translation- Bhagirathi
- Charandas Chor playwright by Habib Tanvir Translated by Anup Hazarika & Bhagirathi
- Sikari playwright by Munin Barua
- The Nature playwright by based on an article
- The Customewalla playwright by Baharul Islam
- Godzilla playwright by Baharul Islam
- Dhetteri (Bourgeois gentleman) playwright by Moliere
- Modala gitti playwright by Baharul Islam
- Swabhavjata playwright by Baharul Islam

== Filmography ==
As an actor he acted in different Indian languages.

=== Assamese language ===
- Suruj – directed by Pulak Gogoi
- Sangkalpa – directed by Hem Bora
- Bhai Bhai – directed by Biju Phukan
- Pita Putra – directed by Munin Baruah
- Nayak – directed by Munin Baruah
- Barood – directed by Munin Baruah
- Dinobandhu – directed by Munin Baruah
- Morom Nodir Gabhoru Ghat- directed by Pulak Gogoi
- Bagh Manuhor Khela –
- Ronga Modar – directed by Timothy Hanse
- Antaheen Jatra – directed by Munna Ahmed
- Raktabeez – directed by Biswajeet Bora
- Ejak Jonakir Jilmil – directed by Biswajeet Bora
- Bahniman – directed by Biswajeet Bora
- Phehujali – directed by Biswajeet Bora
- Asene Kunuba Hiyat – (own direction)
- Ajanite Mone Mone – directed by Upakul Bordoloi
- Kaaneen – directed by Monjul Baruah
- Goru – directed by Himanshu Prasad Das
- Ghost of Maaikhuli – directed by Pankaj Soram
- Chandu – directed by Asim Baishya
- Ulka – directed by Pranab Vivek
- Aponjon – directed by Gauri Barman
- The Underworld – directed by Rajesh Jaiswal
- Saat Nomboror Sandhanot – directed by Abdul Majid
- Baibhab – directed by Manju Borah
- Pratyahbaan – directed by Nipon Dholua
- Samiran Barua Ahi Ase – directed by Prodyut Kumar Deka
- Jatinga Ityadi – directed by Sanjib Sabhapandit

=== Sadri language ===
- Maya- directed by Rajesh Bhuyan and Pabitra Margherita

=== Bengali language ===
- Alifa -directed by Deep Choudhury
- Five Days with A Terrorist- directed by Arijit Mukhopadhyay

=== Hindi language ===
- Kaal Sandhya – directed by Bhabendra Nath Saikia
- Merit Animal – directed by Junaid Imam
- Dil Bechara- directed by Mukesh Chhabra
- Chhapaak – directed by Meghna Gulzar
- Maidan – directed Amit Sharma
- Pepper Chicken – directed by Ratan Sil Sarma
- Dhuwa se Dhuwa Taq (short feature) – directed by Biswajeet Bora
- 83 – directed by Kabir Khan
- Bhediya – directed by Amar Kaushik
- Pill
- Sector 36 – directed by Aditya Nimbalkar
- Raakh

=== Kannada language ===
- Hoomale – directed by Nagathihelli Chandrashekhar
- Kotta – directed by M S Satthyu
