= Boloram Das =

Indian actor

- Born: 5 May 1985 (age 41); Guwahati, Assam
- Education: National School of Drama
- Occupation: Actor
- Height: 5 ft 5 in (165 cm)
- Spouse: Tina Bhatia

Boloram Das (Balram) is an Indian actor who has appeared in Hindi, English and Assamese films. He is best known for his roles in Badlapur Boys, Gabbar is Back and High Jack.

== Early life and education ==
Das was born in Guwahati, Assam. He completed his early education from Lal Singh Academy, Kharghuli, Guwahati, Assam and graduated in biochemistry from B. Borooah College, Guwahati, Assam. He had an interest in acting from childhood. He was associated with theatre group JYOTI from a young age and always wanted to pursue a career in acting. He acted in plays under his Guru Balin Chaudhury, Dilip Sharma, Neelu Chakrabarty and Bhupen Borkotoky. In 1992 he was awarded Best Child Actor in the 25th Allahabad Theatre Festival. He achieved the Gold Medal in Mimicry during Assam Youth Festival organized by Guwahati University.

After completing his graduation in 2004 he moved to Delhi with the hope of joining the National School of Drama. Though he failed to gain admission on the first attempt he continued to work in Delhi as a sales executive for a software company while working improve his language skills. He gained admission on this second attempt in 2006. After graduating from NSD, Das joined the National School of Drama Repertory Company and worked there for six months as a B grade artist.

In the year 2010 Boloram das joined Wizcraft International Company which started its new venture Kingdom of dreams in Gurgaon (Haryana). He worked as an actor in the musical play "Zangoora". During his time with Wizcraft he acted in around 800 shows before finally moving to Mumbai in 2013 to try his luck in Bollywood. He has acted in almost 30 plays. Das made his mark in theatre not only as an actor but as a director too having directed three plays: "Romeo and Juliet", "Mayongor Bez" and "Miss Julie".

== Acting career ==
Das started his acting career with the English Language film The Black Russian directed by Carlos Valle and Paul Sidhu in the year 2013. Next year he appeared in his first Bollywood movie Badlapur Boys. Since then he has acted in many Bollywood films like Gabbar Is Back, High Jack and Karwaan where he played the role of an iPad Man and a Cargo officer respectively. Some of his upcoming Bollywood Films are Om and Pepper Chicken. Recently he was widely appreciated for his negative role in Sony Liv Original Film Welcome Home.

Besides working in Hindi films Das continued to work in his vernacular Assamese and English language films. His first Assamese venture was Antareen released in 2017. In the same year he appeared in another Assamese movie named Beautiful Lives. On the other hand, his latest release in English language is Interconnect in 2018.

Apart from working on big screen Das acted in many short films in both Hindi and Assamese language. Some of his notable short films are Do ke teen? (Hindi), Liakat (Assamese), Mirchi Light (Hindi) etc.

He has acted in Web Series like Boygiri (2017) and Typewriter (2019). He is a much known face in Indian television as he regularly appears in TVC. He has appeared in commercial like Parle Goldstar Coockies with Amitabh Bachhan, Hajmola with Ajay Devgn, Axis Bank, Dairy Milk, Hyundai, Swiggy food delivery app, Tata Sky, Tata Docomo, Eichar and Ram Bandhu Papad are some of his popular TVC.

== Personal life ==
Das was brought up in a family of four siblings in Guwahati, Assam. He is married to actor Tina Bhatia who he met during his time in NSD. After many years of friendship they finally got married in 2014.

== Filmography ==
Year	Film	Language	Director	Character
2013	The Black Russian	English	Chris Barfoot	Sallam
2014	Badlapur Boys	Hindi	Shailesh Verma	Sadhu
2014	Haider	Hindi	Vishal Bhardwaj	Interrogation Officer
2015	Gabbar Is Back	Hindi	Krish	Peon
2016	You Are My Sunday	Hindi	Milind Dhaimade	Pest control guy
2016	Mirchi Lights (Short)	Hindi	Himank Gupta	Father
2017	Ok Jaanu	Hindi	Shaad Ali	Security guard
2017	Antareen	Assamese	Monjul Baruah	Dr. Samiran
2017	Beautiful Lives	Assamese	Kangkan Deka	Ajay
2017	Do Ke Teen!	Hindi (Short)	Priyanshu Painyuli	Mahesh
2017	Liakat	Assamese (Short)	Monjul Baruah	Liakat
2018	High Jack	Hindi	Akash Khurana	iPad Man
2018	Interconnect	English	Nivi Singh	Rehman
2018	Karwaan	Hindi	Akash Khurana	Crago officer
2019	Blank	Hindi	Behzad Khambata	Farooq
2020	A Suitable Boy	English	Meera Nair	Boat Man
2020	Welcome Home	Hindi	Pushkar Mahabal	Bhola
2020	Pepper Chicken	Hindi	Ratan Sil Sarma	Dashmesh
2022	A Thursday	Hindi	Behzad Khambata	Charan Kumar
2023	Anur	Assamese	Monjul Baruah	Om Jyoti Das
2023	Falimy	Malayalam	Nithish Sahadev	Pappu Panday
2024	Village Rockstars 2	Assamese	Rima Das	Bolo
2024	Taarikh	Assamese	Himjyoti Talukdar	Anuran Hazarika

== Awards and nominations ==
Das started receiving awards from a very young age. He received two prestigious awards before venturing into films. He received Best Child Actor award in 25th Akhil Bharatiya Natya Samaroh, Allahabad in the year 1992. He also received Gold Medal in Mimicry in Assam Youth Festival organized by Gauhati University in the year 2003.

His first Assamese film Antareen got him his first award for a film actor. He received Best Supporting Actor at 7th Assam state film award from Government of Assam in the year 2015-16. He has received two state nominations also.

Best Actor Nomination in Prag Cine Award for the film Antareen in the year 2016

Best Actor Nomination in Prag Cine Award for the film "Beautiful Lives" in the year 2017.

89 th Dr. Bhabendra nath saikia memorial award, 2020 in the year 2021
