= Welcome Home (2020 film) =

2020 film by Pushkar Mahabal

- Directed by: Pushkar Mahabal
- Written by: Ankita Narang
- Produced by: Paresh Rawal; Swaroop Rawal
- Starring: Kashmira Irani; Swarda Thigale; Boloram Das; Shashi Bhushan; Tina Bhatia
- Cinematography: Saee Bhope
- Edited by: Pushkar Mahabal
- Music by: Meghdeep Bose
- Production companies: Playtime Creationn; Monolith
- Distributed by: SonyLIV
- Release date: 6 November 2020
- Running time: 125 minutes
- Country: India
- Language: Hindi

Welcome Home is a 2020 Indian Hindi-language horror thriller film inspired by a real-life incident. It stars Kashmira Irani, Swarda Thigale, Boloram Das, Shashi Bhushan, and Tina Bhatia, and follows two teachers who stumble upon an isolated house with a dark secret inside.

The film was written by Ankita Narang and directed by Pushkar Mahabal. The music was composed by Meghdeep Bose, with cinematography by Saee Bhope, and editing by Pushkar Mahabal. Produced by actor Paresh Rawal and his wife, model and actor Swaroop Rawal, Welcome Home premiered on SonyLIV in 2020. As of May 2024, the film is no longer available on SonyLIV for undisclosed reasons.

== Plot ==
A government agent painting identification numbers on electric poles for a census survey approaches an isolated house on the village outskirts, hears the sounds of a woman and a small child crying from inside and is confronted by an old woman.

Anuja, a high school teacher yearning for a better life and independence, is pressured by her father into an arranged marriage. Tasked with collecting census data for her village, she is initially paired with a man she had previously rejected. Her friend and fellow teacher Neha volunteers to accompany her instead. While conducting the survey, they reach a remote house where a young, pregnant woman named Prerna silently tries to turn them away. When it starts raining heavily, Neha insists on entering, forcing Prerna to let them inside.

Inside, Prerna reveals she lives with an old woman named Leela and the family servant Bhola. When Anuja asks about her pregnancy, Prerna eerily replies that this is not her first child—all her newborns cry briefly before dying. Anuja notices bruises on Prerna's body. Leela soon appears and angrily drives them out. Before leaving, they briefly encounter Bhola, and Anuja secretly photographs the house.

Back at school, Neha's controlling brother Naru confronts her. Concerned for Prerna, Anuja convinces Neha to return to the house the next day. Bhola lets them in, and they meet Ghanshyam, Leela's son in his third year of observing a five-year vow of silence, whom they assume is Prerna's husband. Leela claims Prerna's latest baby died the previous week, noting Prerna showed no grief. Heavy rain traps them overnight.

After an unsettling dinner, the women grow increasingly uneasy. Anuja sees Ghanshyam dragging a person into a shed. They discover the exits are locked and realize they are trapped. They escape with the house's keys to the shed, where they find the severely injured government agent. Panicking, they flee back inside to retrieve Anuja's forgotten phone, but they decide to act normal and stay the night.

The next morning, Leela reveals to her family that she saw them outside. Their escape attempt fails as their scooter gets stuck in a muddy ditch. Ghanshyam and Bhola quickly catch up to the women and capture them, locking them in a basement. Both realizing the danger they’re in, Neha starts banging on the door, screaming desperately for help. Annoyed and infuriated by her nonstop screaming, Bhola throws boiling water on Neha, severely burning her. Meanwhile, Anuja's fiancé Vaibhav arrives at her home looking for her and argues heatedly with Naru, who was searching for Neha, accused Vaibhav of Anuja being a bad influence on his sister.

In the basement, Anuja starts banging on the door, however the women are brutally beaten by Ghanshyam and Bhola. Later, Ghanshyam later has sex with Prerna, confirming that he was the man who had gotten her pregnant. Bhola attempts to rape Neha, but Anuja intervenes only to be strangled unconscious by an enraged Bhola. After Bhola leaves, Anuja manages to untie them both and they discover a tunnel leading outside. However, Naru arrives at the house, confronts and aggressively interrogates Ghanshyam and Bhola on Neha’s whereabouts and is killed by the two men while trying to search for and rescue his sister, who screams his name for help. Neha is recaptured in shock, while Anuja hides in the shed with the agent, who reveals he’s been trapped in the household for a long time and that Ghanshyam kills every infant born in that house.

Prerna directs Ghanshyam to the shed. The agent sacrifices himself to help Anuja escape, but her injured leg forces her to return. At the house, Bhola rapes Neha while Ghanshyam forces Anuja to watch. Enraged and hellbent on revenge, Anuja escapes, sets the family's cow named Ganga on fire to create a distraction, and later ambushes and kills Bhola in the forest.

Prerna approaches the battered Neha and reveals the horrifying truth: Ghanshyam is her father, not her husband. He killed her mother Savitri for disobedience and has been physically and sexually abusing Prerna since childhood, impregnating her multiple times and murdering the infants to cover his incest and protect his patriarchal control over her. Prerna had resigned herself to this fate until Neha's words spark doubt. Prerna later secretly unlocks Neha's door, allowing her to escape.

Anuja and Neha reunite and decide to return for revenge. Entering through the tunnel, Anuja ambushes Ghanshyam, beats him viciously, and pushes him off the roof. Leela stabs Neha in the leg, but Neha fights back and kills her with her own knife. Meanwhile, Ghanshyam, on the brink of death, breaks his silence for the first time in three years of his five year vow, shouting for his mother. Anuja then slits the dying Ghanshyam's throat. Prerna watches with visible relief and self-peace as the two exhausted women sit down.

A textual epilogue reveals that over twenty years, Ghanshyam had impregnated his daughter Prerna eight times, killing seven of the babies, while the eighth was stillborn. He and Bhola had murdered thirteen people, with the first victim being Ghanshyam’s own wife Savitri and Bhola had murdered nine of the victims. Anuja and Neha were the only ones to survive.

== Cast ==
- Kashmira Irani as Anuja
- Swarda Thigale as Neha
- Boloram Das as Bhola
- Shashi Bhushan as Ghanshyam, Prerna's father
- Tina Bhatia as Prerna
- Akshita Arora as Leela, Prerna's grandmother and Ghanshyam's mother
- Siddhesh Wanikar as Naru, Neha's brother
- Hardish Anil Pandya as the government agent
- Romil K as Vaibhav, Anuja's fiancé
- Swapnil Abhyankar as Amol Joshi
- Mahesh Raipurkar as Anuja's landlord
- Sarang S Abhyankar as Government officer

== Reception ==
=== Critical response ===
The film received mostly positive reviews from critics, with praise for the performances and writing. Nandini Ramnath of Scroll.in wrote "In the SonyLIV film Welcome Home, Boloram Das is far more effective and terrifying as a man who promises to perform horrible deeds and goes right ahead. Welcome Home has other strong performances too, especially by its female leads, who movingly bring out the film’s themes of imprisonment and liberation."

Avinash Ramachandran of The Indian Express said "Welcome Home might seem like a gritty chamber drama, but it is also an affecting commentary on patriarchy."

Devasheesh Pandey from News 18 gave the film 2.5 stars out of 5 and wrote "Welcome Home is not just another movie but carries gracefully a narrative that seeks transformation and liberation from victimhood, which as Anuja points out, does not rest upon gender, but can happen with anyone."

Pallabi Dey Purkayastha of The Times of India gave 3.5 stars out of 5 and wrote "Welcome Home’ gives hope: hope that every time a leach elbows a naïve-looking girl, she will fight back. Hope that every time a wife, mother or daughter is assaulted or murdered, the women would fight back and seek justice."
