= Pyaar Ke Papad =

- Genre: Comedy drama
- Written by: Anirudh Madesia; Neeraj Kumar Pal; Nikhil dev Mishra; Mitali Bhattacharya; Mraduta Sharma; Shivangi Singh; Ranveer Pratap Singh; Naman Arora
- Directed by: Pushkar Mahabal; Prince Dhimam; Sohit k sarkar thakuri
- Creative directors: Megha S Kumar; Bhavini Bheda
- Starring: Swarda Thigale; Aashay Mishra; Akhilendra Mishra
- Opening theme: Pyaar ke papad
- Country of origin: India
- Original language: Hindi
- No. of seasons: 1
- No. of episodes: 150

Production
- Producers: Anirudh Madesia; Neeraj Kumar Pal; Suzana Ghai
- Camera setup: Multi-camera
- Running time: 21 minutes
- Production companies: Rangbaaz Production; Panorama Entertainment

Original release
- Network: STAR Bharat
- Release: 18 February – 10 August 2019

Pyaar Ke Papad (transl. Love's Papadum) is an Indian romantic comedy television series produced by Panorama Entertainment, aired on Star Bharat. It premiered on 18 February 2019 and ended on 10 August 2019.

== Plot ==
Omkar Gupta and his colleague Shivika Mishra fall in love and want to get married. However, Shivika's casteist father Trilokinath does not approve of the union because of the caste differences between his daughter and Omkar, and sets before Omkar many challenges to test that he is worthy of Shivika's hand in marriage.

== Cast ==
=== Main ===
- Swarda Thigale as Shivika Gupta (néé Mishra), love interest of Omkar Gupta
- Aashay Mishra as Omkar Gupta, love interest of Shivika Mishra. Works as a bank manager at Kanpur cooperative bank.
- Akhilendra Mishra as Trilokinath Mishra, Shivika Mishra's father, Omkar Gupta's father in law.
- Anshul Trivedi as Alankar, Antagonist, Fiance of Shivika Mishra arranged by her father, Trilokinath Mishra.

=== Recurring ===
- Ekta Methai as Shivika's younger sister; Trilokinath's daughter.
- Tina Bhatia as Jaya, Jagat's wife
- Jinal Jain as Dolly; Shivika's friend.
- Priyanka Shukla
- Anaya Shivan
- Nelakshi Singh Bhardwaj
- Prerna Gautam
- Azad Ansari as Mangal Gupta; Omkar's brother.
- Pratish Vohra as Nandu Gupta; Omkar's elder brother
- Sonu Pathak as GST; Omkar's friend.
- Chandrahas Pandey as Puttu
- Akshita Arora as Vidhyavati, GST's Mother

== Production ==
Some of the initial sequences were filmed at Kanpur.
