= Pepper Chicken =

Indian Hindi-language film

- Film poster
- Directed by: Ratan Sil Sarma
- Written by: Dhanjit Das; Ratan Sil Sarma; Satish Yadav
- Starring: Dipannita Sharma, Boloram Das, Baharul Islam, Ravi Sarma, Monuj Borkotoky
- Release date: 6 November 2020
- Country: India
- Language: Hindi

Pepper Chicken is an Indian Hindi-language psychological thriller film directed by Ratan Sil Sarma. It stars Dipannita Sharma, Boloram Das, Baharul Islam, Ravi Sarma, and Monuj Borkotoky. The film was released theatrically on 6 November 2020.

== Plot ==
Pepper chicken is a story of a radio jockey who is getting married next day, she starts her journey by a cab leaving her job and the cab journey becomes horrific when they reach to a secluded place. The mystery of cab driver unravels with the story.

== Cast ==
- Dipannita Sharma
- Boloram Das
- Baharul Islam
- Ravi Sarma
- Monuj Borkotoky
