= Gulabo Sitabo =

2020 Indian family comedy film by Shoojit Sircar

- Release poster
- Directed by: Shoojit Sircar
- Written by: Juhi Chaturvedi
- Produced by: Ronnie Lahiri; Sheel Kumar
- Starring: Amitabh Bachchan; Ayushmann Khurrana; Farrukh Jaffar
- Cinematography: Avik Mukhopadhyay
- Edited by: Chandrashekhar Prajapati
- Music by: Songs: Anuj Garg; Shantanu Moitra; Abhishek Arora; Background Score: Shantanu Moitra
- Production companies: Rising Sun Films; Kino Works
- Distributed by: Amazon Prime Video
- Release date: 12 June 2020
- Running time: 125 minutes
- Country: India
- Language: Hindi

Gulabo Sitabo (transl. Puppet Little Rose) is a 2020 Indian Hindi-language comedy drama film directed by Shoojit Sircar, produced by Ronnie Lahiri and Sheel Kumar, and written by Juhi Chaturvedi. Set in Lucknow, it stars Amitabh Bachchan, Ayushmann Khurrana, Abhinav Pundir and Farrukh Jaffar. Due to the COVID-19 pandemic, the film was not released theatrically, but on Amazon Prime Video worldwide on 12 June 2020.

At the 66th Filmfare Awards, Gulabo Sitabo received 13 nominations, including Best Film, Best Director (Sircar) and Best Actor (Bachchan), and won 6 awards, including Best Supporting Actress (Jaffar) and Best Actor (Critics) (Bachchan).

== Plot ==
Chunnan 'Mirza' Nawab (Amitabh Bachchan) is a stingy old ghar jamai who is regarded by most people he knows as a greedy miser. His wife, Fatima Begum (Farrukh Jaffar), who is 17 years older than him, is the owner of Fatima Mahal, a run-down mansion in Lucknow whose rooms are being leased out to various tenants, many of whom are not paying appropriate rent. Begum leaves Mirza with the responsibility of tending to the property, but Mirza cannot wait for Begum's death, so the mansion can be passed down to him. Baankey Rastogi (Ayushmann Khurrana) is a poor tenant of the mansion who lives with his mother and three sisters. He owns a wheat mill shop, and consistently makes and claims for why he can't pay his long-overdue rent despite being charged even less than all the other tenants, much to Mirza's chagrin.

As a result, Mirza nags him to pay his dues whenever they cross paths. This leads to Baankey getting frequently irritated, and in an outburst of anger, he starts a chaos by kicking the wall of a toilet block which collapses, thus angering Mirza, who demands Baankey pay the full cost of repair. Baankey, however, does not pay up, so Mirza attempts to make the lives of him and his family miserable, in every way possible. This is the last straw for Baankey, who vows to exact revenge on Mirza.

Baankey gets his opportunity when Gyanesh Shukla (Vijay Raaz), an archaeologist working for the government, realizes the historic value of the property. He quickly makes plans to seize it, evict everyone living in it, and declare it a government-owned heritage site. Gyanesh explains his plans to Baankey, claiming that alternative accommodation will be provided for those evicted. Baankey realizes that Mirza will end up losing his grip on the mansion, so supports Gyanesh with his motives.

Mirza soon finds out about the situation and hires a local lawyer, Christopher Clarke (Brijendra Kala). Mirza plans to get the ownership of the mansion transferred to himself once Begum dies, so he can evict his tenants and keep the mansion for himself. After a lengthy attempt to track down anyone in Begum's family who could inherit the mansion instead of him, the last step is to get a copy of Begum's left-hand fingerprints. However, Mirza successfully acquires fingerprints from a sleeping Begum, but they are from the wrong hand, which angers Christopher. He resorts to forging the prints instead. Having noticed the mansion's state of disrepair, Christopher introduces Mirza to Munmun Singh, a wealthy builder-developer, who is willing to buy the mansion, demolish it, and build a modern housing complex on the land. Christopher claims that Mirza will get a lump sum of money for this and to the tenants, so the latter very hastily agrees.

Unfortunately, Gyanesh's offer of alternative housing for Baankey and the other tenants are false claims, and Gyanesh brings a couple of men to declare the mansion as a heritage site, and also says that all the tenants will have to vacate the house. Arguments and fights begin as Baankey and the tenants are furious that they won't get alternative housing, as promised to them. Suddenly then Christopher arrives with Munmun and the developers, and a suitcase full of money for Mirza and the tenants. Mirza sees the tenants taking some of the money, and sits on the suitcase, proclaiming all the money is his, leading to further furious arguments and fights.

However, they are suddenly interrupted when Begum's maid announces that Begum has gone. Everyone falls in chaos and confusion, including Baankey, who goes up to her room to see her, while Mirza secretly feels happy at first, thinking Begum has died and the mansion is now his. However, Baankey finds nothing but a letter written by Begum to Mirza, in which it is revealed that Begum is still alive, having eloped with her old lover Abdul Rehman and selling the mansion to him for a rupee to preserve it, thus foiling Mirza's plans.

Now, everyone moves out, including Baankey and Mirza, depressed at having to leave the old mansion, which now became an archaeological heritage site. This is worsened by them, Mirza and Baankey being shut out when Begum returns to the mansion to celebrate her 95th birthday with her lover. Begum left behind an antique chair for Mirza, and he remarks to Baankey that he sold it locally for ₹250, which surprises Baankey. The film then closes showing Begum's antique chair in an antique shop in Mumbai, priced at ₹1,35,000.

== Cast ==
- Amitabh Bachchan as Chunnan "Mirza" Nawab
- Ayushmann Khurrana as Baankey Rastogi
- Farrukh Jaffar as Fatima Begum
- Vijay Raaz as Gyanesh Shukla, Government Officer
- Brijendra Kala as Christopher Clark, Lawyer
- Srishti Shrivastava as Guddo
- Purnima sharma as Fauzia
- Tina Bhatia as Dulahin
- Mohammad Naushad as Puppeteer
- Nalneesh Neel as Sheikhu Nawab
- Archana Shukla as Susheela
- Ananya Dwivedi as Neetu
- Ujali Raj as Payal
- Sunil Kumar Verma as Mishra ji
- Azad Mishra as Sayyad
- Uday Veer Singh Yadav as Munna Saxena
- Shi Prakash Bajpai as Pandey ji
- Abhinav Pundir
- Poonam Mishra as Mishrain
- Jogi Mallang as Munmun ji
- Trilochan Kalra as Sinha
- Behram Rana as Abdul Rehman
- Zia Ahmed Khan as Doctor
- Sandeep Yadav as Policeman

== Production ==
In May 2019, in an interview Shoojit Sircar informed that Juhi Chaturvedi and he worked on the script. He also revealed Chaturvedi came up with a quirky story. He said, "As soon as I read the script, I shared it with Mr Bachchan and Ayushmann at the same time. I thought it would take some time to develop and take it forward, but everyone was so enthusiastic to work on this script, they figured out their dates and here we are..." The title is named after a traditional puppet show in Uttar Pradesh which revolves around two women, the simple Sitabo and headstrong Gulabo (depicted either as wife and mistress respectively or sisters-in-law to the same man), bickering with each other.

Amitabh Bachchan and Ayushmann Khurrana were cast for the lead roles, making it their first film together. The filming began in the third week of June 2019 in Lucknow.

== Release ==
The release date of the film was initially announced for November 2019, but was then advanced to 28 April 2020 and later moved to February 28, 2020. The film's release date was again postponed to 17 April 2020. The film was then scheduled to be released on 17 April 2020, and then was further postponed.

Due to the COVID-19 pandemic, the film was not released theatrically, but on Amazon Prime Video worldwide on 12 June 2020.

== Soundtrack ==
The film's music was composed by with Shantanu Moitra, Abhishek Arora and Anuj Garg with lyrics written by Puneet Sharma, Dinesh Pant and Vinod Dubey.

== Critical reception ==
On the review aggregator website Rotten Tomatoes, 75% of 16 critics' reviews are positive, with an average rating of 6.1/10.

Anupama Chopra of Film Companion said that "The film takes its time setting up this world, which is both contained and timeless. The first hour moves at a measured pace. In this, Gulabo Sitabo is more like October than Piku. The humour is quieter," but also criticises it for its pacing, "These characters aren't necessarily likeable so you might feel a little fatigued in their company. The narrative also meanders." Baradwaj Rangan of Film Companion South wrote "The film feels like an anecdote stretched into a novel. By the end, the loose plot does come together, but it doesn't feel like it's been worth this kind of build-up".

The Times of India gave it a rating of 3.5 out of 5 saying, "While the movie does well on many fronts and one of the highlights being the premise itself, the build-up consumes a fair share of the film, making it a tad draggy at the start." It also praised the performances of all actors in the film. It praised Amitabh Bachchan's performance, thus: "He sinks into the character and every facet of it". Mike McCahill of The Guardian gave it slightly negative review, giving 2 out of 5. Unimpressed by the performances and narrative, he says, "Bachchan works hard at his swaddled meanie character, but make-up and props are doing most of the work, work that ultimately serves to distance actor from audience. A tired-seeming Khurrana, meanwhile, presents as blandly anonymous, reducing a final push for pathos to a limp shrug. Everyone appears at the mercy of shaky narrative foundations.".

== Accolades ==
Award	Date of ceremony	Category	Recipient(s)	Result	Ref.
Filmfare Awards	27 March 2021	Best Supporting Actress	Farrukh Jaffar	Won	
Filmfare Awards	27 March 2021	Best Actor (Critics)	Amitabh Bachchan	Won	
Filmfare Awards	27 March 2021	Best Dialogue	Juhi Chaturvedi	Won	
Filmfare Awards	27 March 2021	Best Cinematography	Abhik Mukhopadhyay	Won	
Filmfare Awards	27 March 2021	Best Costume Design	Veera Kapur	Won	
Filmfare Awards	27 March 2021	Best Production Design	Mansi Mehta	Won	
Filmfare Awards	27 March 2021	Best Film	Gulabo Sitabo	Nominated	
Filmfare Awards	27 March 2021	Best Film (Critics)	Gulabo Sitabo	Nominated	
Filmfare Awards	27 March 2021	Best Director	Shoojit Sircar	Nominated	
Filmfare Awards	27 March 2021	Best Actor	Amitabh Bachchan	Nominated	
Filmfare Awards	27 March 2021	Best Story	Juhi Chaturvedi	Nominated	
Filmfare Awards	27 March 2021	Best Editing	Chandrashekhar Prajapati	Nominated	
Filmfare Awards	27 March 2021	Best Sound Design	Samal	Nominated	

== See also ==
- Indian puppetry
- Kathputli
