= Farrukh Jaffar =

Indian actress (1933–2021)

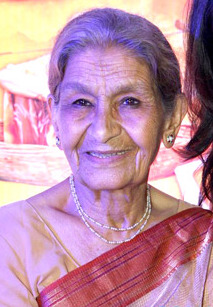
- Jaffar in 2016
- Born: 1933; Chakesar, United Provinces, British India (present day Jaunpur, Uttar Pradesh, India)
- Died: 15 October 2021 (aged 87–88); Lucknow, Uttar Pradesh, India
- Education: Lucknow University
- Occupations: Actor; Radio presenter

Farrukh Jaffar (1933 – 15 October 2021) was an Indian actress and radio presenter in Bollywood. Most remembered for her roles in films like Swades (2004), Peepli Live (2010) and Gulabo Sitabo for which won the Filmfare Award for Best Supporting Actress. Having begun her career with Vividh Bharti in 1963, she made a transition into acting with a supporting role in the 1981 film Umrao Jaan. Jaffar continued to act sporadically, and beginning in the late 2010s, gained wider recognition for working in a spate of critically successful films. At the age of 88, she won the Filmfare Award for Best Supporting Actress for her performance as Fatima Begum in Gulabo Sitabo, becoming the oldest winner of an acting Filmfare.

== Early life and education ==
Farrukh Jaffar was born in 1933 in Chakesar village of Jaunpur district, United Provinces of British India (present-day Uttar Pradesh). She attended a local school and later moved to Lucknow, where she graduated from the Lucknow University.

== Career ==
She started her career in 1963 when she became one of the first radio announcers of Vividh Bharati (All India Radio), Lucknow. Later at age 49, she made her screen debut playing the role of actress Rekha's mother in Muzaffar Ali's film Umrao Jaan (1981).

== Personal life ==
Jaffar was married to Syed Muhammad Jaffar, a journalist and politician, who remained a member of Uttar Pradesh Legislative Council (MLC) and Chief of Congress in the state. The couple have two daughters—Mehru Jaffar and Shaheen Ahmad .

Jaffar died on 15 October 2021, following a brain stroke in Lucknow at the age of 88.

== Filmography ==
Year	Title	Role	Notes
1981	Umrao Jaan	Umrao Jaan's biological mother	
2004	Swades	Fatima Bi	
2009	Peepli Live	Mrs. Manikpuri / Amma	
2013	Anwar Ka Ajab Kissa	Old Woman	
2015	Barefoot to Goa	Grandmother	
2015	Jaanisaar	Noor's grandmother	
2015	Parched	Jaanki's Grandma	
2015	Aligarh	Deepu's Landlord	
2016	Sultan	Sultan's grandmother	
2017	What Will People Say	Bestemor	
2017	Secret Superstar	Badi Apa	
2019	Photograph	Daadi	
2020	Gulabo Sitabo	Fatima Begum	
2021	Mehrunisa	Mehrunisa	
2021	Ammaa Ki Boli	Ammaa	
2022	Mulaqat		Short film
2022	Mere Desh Ki Dharti	Daadi	
2022	Sehar	TBA	Final film role

== Awards and nominations ==
Year	Award	Film	Category	Result	Ref.
2011	Producers Guild Film Awards	Peepli Live	Best Actress in a Supporting Role	Nominated	
2020	FOI Online Awards	Photograph	Best Supporting Actress	Nominated	
2021	FOI Online Awards	Gulabo Sitabo	Best Supporting Actress	Won	
2021	Filmfare Awards	Gulabo Sitabo	Best Supporting Actress	Won	
