= Kaaneen - A Secret Search =

- Directed by: Monjul Baruah
- Written by: Rita Chowdhury
- Based on: Rajib Ishwar by Rita Chowdhury
- Produced by: Gopendra Mohan Das
- Starring: Jahanara Begum; Baharul Islam; Partha Hazarika
- Cinematography: Nahid Ahmed
- Edited by: Twenchang
- Music by: Tarali Sarma, Minimi
- Production company: Shivam Creation
- Release dates: August 2018 (Guwahati International Film Festival); 22 March 2019
- Running time: 135 minutes
- Country: India
- Language: Assamese

Kaaneen - A Secret Search is an Assamese language feature film written by Rita Chowdhury and directed by Monjul Baruah and starring Jahanara Begum, Baharul Islam, Partha Hazarika, etc. The story of the film is based on the 2007 Assamese novel Rajib Ishwar by Rita Chowdhury. This the second feature film by the director after Antareen.(2017)

Kaaneen - A Secret Search won the Silver Camera Award at 2nd Guwahati International Film Festival 2018. Kaaneen - A Secret Search was screened at the Bangla Axomiya Film Festival 2018, New Delhi and 4th Northeast Film Festival, Pune 2019.

== Cast ==
- Jahanara Begum as Mandira Baruah
- Baharul Islam as IGP Abhijit Baruah
- Partha Hazarika as Rajib
- Jolly Bhattacharyya as Mandira's mother
- Rahul Gautam Sarma as Abhi
- Kasvi Sarma as Rashmi
- Dhananjay Devnath as Dey Babu
- Mintu Baruah as Mandira's father
- Prankrishna Mahanta as Mandira's uncle
- Purnima Pathak Saikia as warden
- Nirod Choudhury as Mr. Chakraborty
- Ronal Hussain
- Manoj Gogoi
- Disha Saikia
- Popi Kakoti
- Abatosh Bhuyan
- Nayan Jyoti Gogoi

== Story line ==
The chance encounter with some onlookers crowding an abandoned infant on the roadside leads a wife of a high-ranking police officer track down her similarly abandoned child. The stumbles and the predicaments in her that search fail to deter her and she finds herself on the threshold of uniting with her offspring.

== Synopsis ==
A chance incidence of coming across an abandoned newborn baby amidst a crowd of curious on-lookers on the side of the road sets in chaotic motion the apparently fulfilled life of Mandira, the housewife of a high-ranking police officer. She makes up her mind and takes the baby to the hospital. But the attending doctors' casual chat between themselves recalls in her mind the buried memories of her own baby from a premarital encounter and she becomes anxious to get back her abandoned child of whose whereabouts or fate she knows nothing. While her high social situation encumbers her efforts to track down her child, the primordial mother in her overrides all the inhibitions and hindrances and finally she meets him in his modest shanty-like accommodation. She finds her child who is now a grow-up young man, living with an aged widow, who used to work at an orphanage and whom her son addresses as mother. The sense of guilt and a mother's love for her child in Mandira makes her overlook the young man's gruff impolite attitude towards her as though she's guilty of the angst in the young man's mind. Mandira desperately wants to get her son back in her life as the shadow of past guilt keeps shrieking in her conscience, while the incompatible differences between her world and that of the young man looms in the backdrop.

== Accolades ==
- Silver Camera Award at 2nd Guwahati International Film Festival 2018.
- Special Jury Mention Award for supporting role to Partha Hazarika at 2nd Guwahati International Film Festival 2018.
