= Guwahati Asian Film Festival =

Film festival in India

The Guwahati Asian Film Festival (GAFF) is an annual film festival held in Guwahati, Assam, dedicated to showcasing cinematic works from across Asia. The inaugural edition took place from 7 to 9 February 2025, at Jyoti Chitraban Film Studio in Kahilipara, Guwahati. The festival serves as a platform to celebrate diverse storytelling traditions, promote cultural exchange, and facilitate dialogue between filmmakers and audiences. The 2025 edition featured films from countries including Turkey, Kazakhstan, Hong Kong, Indonesia, Iran, and China.

== Inaugural edition ==
The festival opened with the screening of In the Arms of the Tree, Iran's official submission for the 97th Academy Awards. GAFF 2025 featured a diverse lineup of films and special sections dedicated to Indian and North Eastern cinema. Monita Borgohain, the honorary festival director, highlighted the festival's mission of fostering creative engagement and nurturing emerging voices in Asian cinema. Several panel discussions and interactive sessions were held, featuring participation from renowned industry professionals such as Sri Lankan filmmaker Prasanna Vithanage, Indian theatre and film actor Sheeba Chaddha, and filmmaker Onir.

== Closing ==
The festival concluded on 9 February 2025, with the announcement of awards at the closing ceremony. Haobam Paban Kumar's film Joseph’s Son won the Best Film award. The closing film, My Melbourne, was directed by Imtiaz Ali, Rima Das, Onir, and Kabir Khan. The event witnessed participation from top filmmakers, film enthusiasts, and industry professionals, marking it as a significant addition to India's cultural calendar. GAFF aims to establish itself as a key destination for Asian cinema, providing a vital space for artistic and cinematic expression.
