= Guwahati International Film Festival =

Indian annual film festival

- Logo of GIFF
- Location: Guwahati, Assam, India
- Founded: 2017
- No. of films: 7 days . 32 countries . 78 films as per the 1st Guwahati International Film Festival, 2017
- Website: giff.assam.gov.in/GIFF/

The Guwahati International Film Festival (GIFF) is an annual film festival held in Guwahati, Assam, India. The State Government-owned Jyoti Chitraban (Film Studio) Society organised the festival in association with the Dr. Bhupen Hazarika Regional Government Film and Television Institute. The first ever Guwahati International Film Festival (GIFF) was held in northeast India, opened on the 28th of October, in 2017 by Assam Chief Minister Sarbananda Sonowal. The Assam government supported festival began on 28 October with screening of the Oscar winning ‘The Salesman’, directed by Asghar Farhadi and produced by a joint collaboration of Iran and France.

== 1st GIFF ==
1st edition of Guwahati International Film Festival held from 28 October to 2 November 2017 jointly at Srimanta Sankaradev Kalakshetra and Dr. Bhupen Hazarika Regional Government Film and Television Institute commonly known as Jyoti Chitraban. Chief minister Sarbananda Sonowal formally inaugurated it on 28 October and festival began on 28 October with screening of the Oscar winning ‘The Salesman’, directed by Asghar Farhadi.

=== Films ===
78 films from 32 countries were screened in 1st GIFF. Six Iranian movies that were screened at the GIFF are ‘Dokhtar’ by Reza Mirkarimi, ‘Rokha Divaneh’ by Abolhassan Davoodi, ‘Malaria’ by Parviz Shahbazi, ‘Raftan’ by Navid Mahmoudi, ‘Valderama’ by Abbas Amini and ‘Inja Kassi Nemimirad’ by Hossein Kondoir. The five films of Turkey were ‘Ember’ directed by Zeki Demirkubuz, ‘Yarim’ by Cagil Nurhak Aydogdu, ‘Toz Bezi’ by Ahu Ozturk, ‘Rauf’ by Baris Kayer and Soner Caner, and ‘Kalander Sogugu’ by Mustafa Kara. Films from Switzerland, Germany, Spain, Argentina, Poland, Croatia, Serbia, Slovenia, Latvia, Japan, Belgium, Ireland, Czech Republic, Bulgaria, Israel, Greece, Austria, Russia, Philippines, Afghanistan, Peru, Romania, Denmark, Cyprus, Estonia and the United States were also shown.

=== Sections ===
The GIFF had sections on World Cinema, Indian Panorama, Retrospectives, Cinema of North East, Cinema of Assam and the Tribute. The list of Assamese films included renowned director Jahnu Baruah’s ‘Hkhagoroloi Bohu door’, ‘Ajeyo’, ‘Halodhiya Choraye Baodhan Khai’ and ‘Konikar Ramdhenu’. Films by pioneering filmmakers of Assam — Dr Bhupen Hazarika (‘Shakuntala’), Abdul Mazid (‘Chameli Memsahib’) and Dr Bhabendra Nath Saikia (‘Sandhya Raag’) were also shown.

=== Awards ===
The GIFF had a competition section only for Assamese films, where Sankar Borua-directed ‘Khandobdaah’ (Grief on a Sunday Morning) was adjudged the best. ‘Antardrishti’ (Man with the Binocular) by Rima Das was awarded the second best Assamese film, while ‘Haanduk’ (The Hidden Corner) of Jaicheng Jai Dohutia received the Special Jury Award.

Film personalities such as Adoor Gopalakrishnan, Shaji N. Karun, Jahnu Barua, Resul Pookutty and A. K. Bir were associated with GIFF in various capacities.

== 2nd GIFF ==
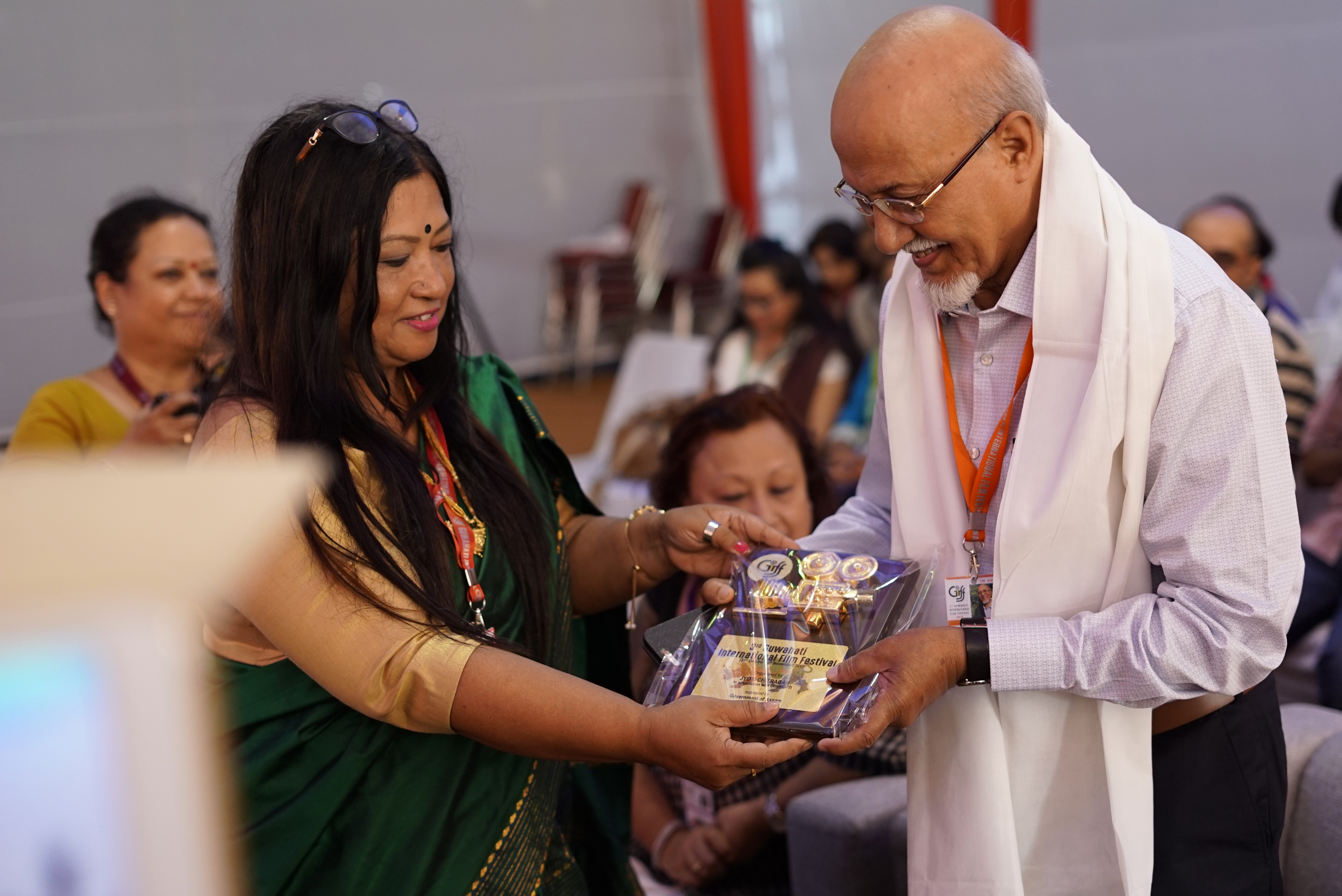
Festival direct Monita Borgohain felicitates film critic Apurba Sarma at GIFF 2019

The 2nd edition of the Guwahati International Film Festival was held from 25 October to 31 October jointly at the Srimanta Sankaradev Kalakshetra and the Dr. Bhupen Hazarika Regional Government Film and Television Institute, better known as Jyoti Chitraban.

Assam Chief Minister Sarbananda Sonowal inaugurated the festival and ASEAN section was inaugurated by State Industries and Commerce and Act East Affairs Minister Chandra Mohan Patowary.

The festival began on 25 October with the screening of ‘Bhoga Khirikee’, directed by Jahnu Barua while Black Crow' (Siyah Karga) by Turkish Director Muhammet Tayfur Aydin was the closing film.

=== Films ===
Total 108 movies from 50 countries screened in 2nd GIFF. During the event, films from Spain, France, Argentina, Poland, Hungary, Italy, Cambodia, Croatia, Latvia, Czech Republic, Israel, Greece, Russia, Turkey, Philippines, Iran, Vietnam, Bangladesh, Qatar, Indonesia, Portugal, Venezuela, Sri Lanka and Mexico were shown. This year, ASEAN was the focus region instead of the usual practice of having a focus country. There were 16 films from 10 countries of the ASEAN region screened in the festival.

=== Awards ===
The competition category of the GIFF saw the Golden Camera, the Best Feature Film of North East, going to Arup Manna's film 'Aamrityu- The Quest'. The award carries a cash prize of Rs 2,00,000. The Silver Camera for second Best Feature Film of North East, with a cash prize of Rs 1,50,000, went to 'Kaaneen A Secret Search'. Special Jury Award for Individual with a cash prize of Rs 100, 000 went to Arun Nath for his performance in the Film 'Calendar'; and the Jury's Special Mention Award went to Partha Hazarika for his performance in the film 'Kaaneen- A Secret Search'.

== 3rd GIFF ==
The 3rd edition was postponed owing to the COVID-19 pandemic.
