= Marksheet (film) =

Assamese-language film

- Directed by: Ratan Sil Sarma
- Release date: 6 April 2016
- Language: Assamese

Marksheet is an Indian Assamese-language film directed by Ratan Sil Sarma. It stars Pranami Bora, Jintu kalita and Aditya Malla. The film was released theatrically on 6 April 2016.

== Cast ==
- Pranami Bora
- Jintu Kalita
- Aditya Malla

== Awards and nominations ==
Year	Award	Category	Result	Ref.
2016	Prag Cine Awards	Best Debut Director	Won	
2016	Prag Cine Awards	Best Director	Nominated	
2016	Prag Cine Awards	Best Lyrics	Nominated	
2016	Prag Cine Awards	Best Film Editing	Nominated	
2016	Prag Cine Awards	Best Screenplay	Nominated	
