= Tina Bhatia =

Indian actress

- Born: Indore, Madhya Pradesh
- Education: National School of Drama
- Occupation: Actress
- Spouse: Boloram Das

Tina Bhatia is an Indian actress. She is best known for her roles in Gulabo Sitabo and Gully Boy.

== Acting career ==
Bhatia made her film debut in 2012. She also worked for two TV serials namely Pyar Ke Papad and Kyunki Jeena Isi Ka Naam Hai. She has also worked in English language film Interconnect. In 2019, Bhatia played a role in Gully Boy. In 2020, she appeared in Gulabo Sitabo as a supporting role.

Some of her works are Sonata, BBG India, Servo OIL, Rudaali for Radio Mirchi, Symphony, and Asian Paints.

== Filmography ==
Year	Title	Role	Language	Notes
2012	Oass	Vidya	Hindi	
2018	Interconnect	Bela	English	
2018	Inner City		Hindi	Short film
2019	Gully Boy	Chhoti Ammi	Hindi	
2020	Gulabo Sitabo	Dulhin	Hindi	
2020	Jai Mummy Di	Teji	Hindi	
2020	Welcome Home	Prerna	Hindi	
2023	Pulli		Malayalam	
TBA	Shadow of Othello †	Raziya	Hindi	

== Television ==
Show	Role	Channel
Pyar Ke Papad	Jaya	Star Bharat
Kyuki Jeena Isi Ka Naam Hai	Maya	Doordarshan

== Awards and nominations ==
Bhatia has received two international awards for her short film Inner City. She received Best Actress Award in Starlight Film Awards and Best Performance Female in Lake View International Film Festival. She was also awarded Best Actress at the Cult Critic Movie Award and L' Age d'Or International Arthouse Film Festival. Her film Oass won Best Film Award at Ladakh International Film Festival.
