= Filmfare Award for Best Supporting Actress =

Annual award for Hindi films

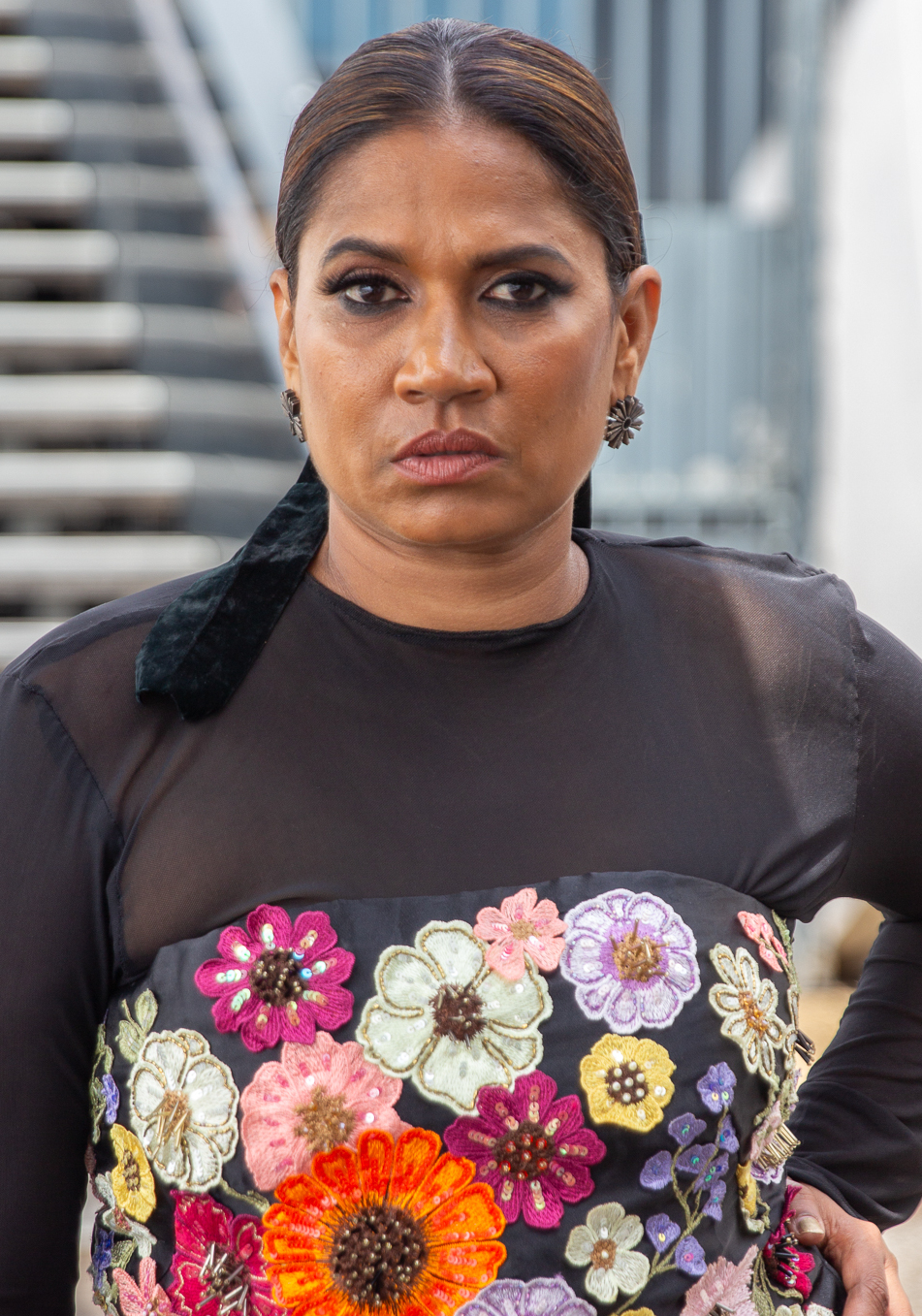
- The 2025 recipient : Chhaya Kadam for Laapataa Ladies
- Awarded for: Best Performance by an Actress in a Supporting Role
- Country: India
- Presented by: Filmfare
- First award: Usha Kiran; Baadbaan (1955)
- Currently held by: Chhaya Kadam; Laapataa Ladies (2025)
- Website: Filmfare Awards

The Filmfare Award for Best Supporting Actress is given by Filmfare as part of its annual Filmfare Awards for Hindi films, to recognise outstanding performance of female actors in a supporting role. Although the Filmfare awards started in 1954, awards for the Best Supporting Actress category started the following year 1955.

== Winners and nominees ==
=== 1950s ===
Year	Photos of winners	Actor	Role(s)	Film	Ref.
1955 (2nd)		Usha Kiran ‡	Usha	Baadbaan	
1955 (2nd)		No Other Nominee			
1956 (3rd)		Nirupa Roy ‡	Malti	Munimji	
1956 (3rd)		Geeta Bali	Basanti	Kavi	
1956 (3rd)		Suryakumari	Raj Rani	Uran Khatola	
1957 (4th)		Vyjayanthimala ‡	Chandramukhi	Devdas	
1957 (4th)		No Other Nominee			
1958 (5th)		Shyama ‡	Chanchal	Sharada	
1958 (5th)		Nanda	Lata	Bhabhi	
1959 (6th)		Nalini Jaywant ‡	Kishori	Kala Pani	
1959 (6th)		Lalita Pawar	Rukmini Singh	Parvarish	
1959 (6th)		Leela Chitnis	Mohan's mother	Sadhna	

=== 1960s ===
Year	Photos of winners	Actor	Role(s)	Film	Ref
1960 (7th)		Lalita Pawar ‡	Mrs. L. D'Sa	Anari	
1960 (7th)		Anita Guha	Ramkali (Rami)	Goonj Uthi Shehnai	
1960 (7th)		Shashikala	Rama Chowdhury	Sujata	
1961 (8th)		Nanda ‡	Nanda	Aanchal	
1961 (8th)		Durga Khote	Maharani Jodha Bai	Mughal-e-Azam	
1961 (8th)		Kumkum	Rajlaxmi Mariam-uz-Zamani	Kohinoor	
1961 (8th)		Lalita Pawar	Mother	Aanchal	
1962 (9th)		Nirupa Roy ‡	Manorama / Aayah	Chhaya	
1962 (9th)		Shubha Khote	Ragini	Gharana	
1962 (9th)		Shubha Khote	Sita	Sasural	
1963 (10th)		Shashikala ‡	Jaswanti	Aarti	
1963 (10th)		Lalita Pawar	Sita Devi Verma	Professor	
1963 (10th)		Waheeda Rehman	Jaba	Sahib Bibi Aur Ghulam	
1964 (11th)		Shashikala ‡	Leela / Ms. Roberts	Gumrah	
1964 (11th)		Ameeta	Naseem	Mere Mehboob	
1964 (11th)		Nimmi	Najma	Mere Mehboob	
1965 (12th)		Nirupa Roy ‡	Shobha	Shehnai	
1965 (12th)		Lalita Pawar	Dai Maa	Kohraa	
1965 (12th)		Shashikala	Roopa	Ayee Milan Ki Bela	
1966 (13th)		Padmini ‡	Bhanu	Kaajal	
1966 (13th)		Helen	Ms. Kitty	Gumnaam	
1966 (13th)		Shashikala	Dr. Neeta Verma	Himalaya Ki God Mein	
1967 (14th)		Simi Garewal ‡	Dr. Anjali	Do Badan	
1967 (14th)		Shashikala	Anita Bakshi (Annie)	Anupama	
1967 (14th)		Shashikala	Rita	Phool Aur Patthar	
1968 (15th)		Jamuna ‡	Gauri	Milan	
1968 (15th)		Mumtaz	Shanta	Ram Aur Shyam	
1968 (15th)		Tanuja	Anjali (Anju) Nath	Jewel Thief	
1969 (16th)		Simi Garewal ‡	Rajni	Saathi	
1969 (16th)		Helen	Veera	Shikar	
1969 (16th)		Shashikala	Chanchal	Neel Kamal	

=== 1970s ===
Year	Photos of winners	Actor	Role(s)	Film	Ref
1970 (17th)		Tanuja ‡	Dhanno	Paisa Ya Pyaar	
1970 (17th)		Bindu	Renu	Ittefaq	
1970 (17th)		Farida Jalal	Renu	Aradhana	
1971 (18th)		Chand Usmani ‡	Champa	Pehchan	
1971 (18th)		Bindu	Neela Allopee Prasad	Do Raaste	
1971 (18th)		Mumtaz	Rita	Aadmi Aur Insaan	
1972 (19th)		Farida Jalal ‡	Bela Singh	Paras	
1972 (19th)		Aruna Irani	Nisha	Caravan	
1972 (19th)		Helen	Lily	Elaan	
1973 (20th)		Zeenat Aman ‡	Jasbir Jaiswal / Janice	Hare Rama Hare Krishna	
1973 (20th)		Bindu	Mala	Dastaan	
1973 (20th)		Nazima	Meena	Be-Imaan	
1974 (21st)		Raakhee Gulzar ‡	Chandni	Daag: A Poem of Love	
1974 (21st)		Aruna Irani	Neema	Bobby	
1974 (21st)		Bindu	Chitra	Abhimaan	
1974 (21st)		Nutan	Anu Rai	Anuraag	
1974 (21st)		Nutan	Mahjubhi	Saudagar	
1975 (22nd)		Durga Khote ‡	Parvati	Bidaai	
1975 (22nd)		Bindu	Kamini Singh	Hawas	
1975 (22nd)		Bindu	Rita	Imtihan	
1975 (22nd)		Jayshree T.	Dancer	Resham Ki Dori	
1975 (22nd)		Moushumi Chatterjee	Tulsi	Roti Kapda Aur Makaan	
1976 (23rd)		Nadira ‡	Margaret "Maggie"	Julie	
1976 (23rd)		Aruna Irani	Rekha	Do Jhoot	
1976 (23rd)		Farida Jalal	Renu Khanna	Majboor	
1976 (23rd)		Nirupa Roy	Sumitra Devi	Deewaar	
1976 (23rd)		Prema Narayan	Dhanno	Amanush	
1977 (24th)	–	Kajri ‡	Chandra	Balika Badhu	
1977 (24th)	–	Asha Parekh	Shanta	Udhar Ka Sindur	
1977 (24th)	–	Bindu	Sarla Shukla	Arjun Pandit	
1977 (24th)	–	Dina Pathak	Gangu Rani	Mausam	
1977 (24th)	–	Waheeda Rehman	Anjali Malhotra	Kabhi Kabhie	
1978 (25th)		Asha Sachdev ‡	Renu	Priyatama	
1978 (25th)		Aruna Irani	Shantimohan Sharma / Shanti "Shanno" Devi	Khoon Pasina	
1978 (25th)		Farida Jalal	Mrs. Subrahmaniam	Shaque	
1978 (25th)		Nazneen	Parvati	Dildaar	
1978 (25th)		Raakhee Gulzar	Nisha	Doosra Aadmi	
1979 (16th)		Reena Roy ‡	Kamini Agarwal	Apnapan	
1979 (16th)		Asha Parekh	Tulsi Chouhan	Main Tulsi Tere Aangan Ki	
1979 (16th)		Nutan	Sanjukta Chouhan	Main Tulsi Tere Aangan Ki	
1979 (16th)		Ranjeeta	Nirmala Deshpande	Pati Patni Aur Woh	
1979 (16th)		Rekha	Zohra Begum	Muqaddar Ka Sikandar	

=== 1980s ===
Year	Photos of winners	Actor	Role(s)	Film	Ref
1980 (27th)		Helen ‡	Suzy	Lahu Ke Do Rang	
1980 (27th)		Dina Pathak	Mrs. Kamala Srivastava	Gol Maal	
1980 (27th)		Farida Jalal	Laila	Jurmana	
1980 (27th)		Jennifer Kendal	Mrs. Mariam Labadoor	Junoon	
1980 (27th)		Neetu Singh	Channo	Kaala Patthar	
1981 (28th)		Padmini Kolhapure ‡	Neetu Saxena	Insaaf Ka Tarazu	
1981 (28th)		Ashalata	Siddheshwari	Apne Paraye	
1981 (28th)		Dina Pathak	Nirmala Gupta	Khubsoorat	
1981 (28th)		Simi Garewal	Kamini Verma	Karz	
1981 (28th)		Talluri Rameshwari	Mala	Aasha	
1982 (29th)		Supriya Pathak ‡	Subhadra	Kalyug	
1982 (29th)		Aruna Irani	Kathy D'Souza	Rocky	
1982 (29th)		Madhavi	Sapna	Ek Duuje Ke Liye	
1982 (29th)		Nanda	Sangeeta	Ahista Ahista	
1982 (29th)		Sarika	Anita Kohli	Sharda	
1983 (30th)		Supriya Pathak ‡	Shabhnam	Bazaar	
1983 (30th)		Kiran Vairale	Chinki	Namkeen	
1983 (30th)		Waheeda Rehman	Jyoti	Namkeen	
1983 (30th)		Nanda	Chhoti Maa	Prem Rog	
1983 (30th)		Ranjeeta Kaur	Shanti	Teri Kasam	
1984 (31st)		Rohini Hattangadi ‡	Bai	Arth	
1984 (31st)		Padmini Kolhapure	Radha	Souten	
1984 (31st)		Rekha	Shakuntala	Mujhe Insaaf Chahiye	
1984 (31st)		Smita Patil	Kavita Sanyal	Arth	
1984 (31st)		Smita Patil	Zeenat	Mandi	
1985 (32nd)		Aruna Irani ‡	Janaki	Pet Pyaar Aur Paap	
1985 (32nd)		Sharmila Tagore	Sitara	Sunny	
1985 (32nd)		Rohini Hattangadi	Shobha	Bhavna	
1985 (32nd)		Rehana Sultan	Kalyani M. Sharma	Hum Rahe Na Hum	
1985 (32nd)		Soni Razdan	Sujata Suman	Saaransh	
1986 (33rd)		Nutan ‡	Aarti	Meri Jung	
1986 (33rd)		Anita Kanwar	Nalini	Janam	
1986 (33rd)		Madhur Jaffrey	Kamala Devi	Saagar	
1986 (33rd)		Rakhee Gulzar	Sujata Sharma	Saaheb	
1986 (33rd)		Sushma Seth	Amina Bai	Tawaif	
1986 (33rd)		Tanvi Azmi	Seeta	Pyari Behna	
1987	NO CEREMONY				
1988	NO CEREMONY				
1989 (34th)		Sonu Walia ‡	Nandini	Khoon Bhari Maang	
1989 (34th)		Anuradha Patel	Maya	Ijaazat	
1989 (34th)		Pallavi Joshi	Saroj	Andha Yudh	

=== 1990s ===
Year	Photos of winners	Actor	Role(s)	Film	Ref
1990 (35th)		Raakhee Gulzar ‡	Sharda Pratap Singh	Ram Lakhan	
1990 (35th)		Anita Kanwar	Rekha Golub	Salaam Bombay	
1990 (35th)		Reema Lagoo	Kaushalya Choudhary	Maine Pyar Kiya	
1990 (35th)		Sujata Mehta	Chanchal S. Yadav	Yateem	
1990 (35th)		Waheeda Rehman	Lata Khanna	Chandni	
1991 (36th)		Rohini Hattangadi ‡	Suhasini Chavan	Agneepath	
1991 (36th)		Radhika	Laxmi	Aaj Ka Arjun	
1991 (36th)		Reema Lagoo	Mrs. Vikram Roy	Aashiqui	
1991 (36th)		Sangeeta Bijlani	Geeta Sarabhai	Jurm	
1992 (37th)		Farida Jalal ‡	Bibi Gul	Henna	
1992 (37th)		Deepa Sahi	Aarti Malhotra	Hum	
1992 (37th)		Rama Vij	Superintendent Prabhavati	Prem Qaidi	
1992 (37th)		Waheeda Rehman	Daijaan	Lamhe	
1993 (38th)		Aruna Irani ‡	Laxmi Chautala	Beta	
1993 (38th)		Pooja Bedi	Devika	Jo Jeeta Wohi Sikandar	
1993 (38th)		Shilpa Shirodkar	Insp. Henna Ranveer Sethi	Khuda Gawah	
1994 (39th)		Amrita Singh ‡	Roma Mathur	Aaina	
1994 (39th)		Anu Aggarwal	Kiran/Anuradha R. Bakshi	Khal-Naaikaa	
1994 (39th)		Dimple Kapadia	Shanti	Gardish	
1994 (39th)		Raakhee	Savitri	Anari	
1994 (39th)		Shilpa Shetty	Seema Chopra	Baazigar	
1995 (40th)		Dimple Kapadia ‡	Megha Dixit	Krantiveer	
1995 (40th)		Aruna Irani	Asha Sharma	Suhaag	
1995 (40th)		Raveena Tandon	Kaajal Bansal	Laadla	
1995 (40th)		Reema Lagoo	Madhukala Choudhury	Hum Aapke Hain Koun..!	
1995 (40th)		Renuka Shahane	Pooja Choudhury	Hum Aapke Hain Koun..!	
1996 (41st)		Farida Jalal ‡	Lajwanti Singh	Dilwale Dulhania Le Jayenge	
1996 (41st)		Aruna Irani	Gayetridevi Singh	Kartavya	
1996 (41st)		Raakhee	Durga Singh	Karan Arjun	
1996 (41st)		Rita Bhaduri	Sumitra Garewal	Raja	
1996 (41st)		Tanvi Azmi	Farida	Akele Hum Akele Tum	
1997 (42nd)		Rekha ‡	Madam Maya	Khiladiyon Ka Khiladi	
1997 (42nd)		Archana Puran Singh	Shalini 'Shalu' Sehgal	Raja Hindustani	
1997 (42nd)		Helen	Maria Braganza	Khamoshi: The Musical	
1997 (42nd)		Seema Biswas	Flavy Braganza	Khamoshi: The Musical	
1997 (42nd)		Tabu	Tulsibai	Jeet	
1998 (43rd)		Karisma Kapoor ‡	Nisha	Dil To Pagal Hai	
1998 (43rd)		Aruna Irani	Bhagyalaxmi Dixit	Ghulam-E-Mustafa	
1998 (43rd)		Pooja Batra	Anita	Virasat	
1998 (43rd)		Raakhee	Mrs. Sujata Singh	Border	
1998 (43rd)		Urmila Matondkar	Jhanhvi Sahni	Judaai	
1999 (44th)		Rani Mukerji ‡	Tina Malhotra	Kuch Kuch Hota Hai	
1999 (44th)		Preity Zinta	Preeti Nair	Dil Se..	
1999 (44th)		Raakhee	Geeta Malhotra	Soldier	
1999 (44th)		Shefali Shah	Pyaari Mhatre	Satya	
1999 (44th)		Tanvi Azmi	Mrs. Poornima Sehgal	Dushman	

=== 2000s ===
Year	Photos of winners	Actor	Role(s)	Film	Ref
2000 (45th)		Sushmita Sen ‡	Rupali Walia	Biwi No.1	
2000 (45th)		Mahima Chaudhry	Kavita Kishore	Dil Kya Kare	
2000 (45th)		Reema Lagoo	Shanta Shivalkhar	Vaastav: The Reality	
2000 (45th)		Suhasini Mulay	Malti Barve	Hu Tu Tu	
2000 (45th)		Sushmita Sen	Neha	Sirf Tum	
2001 (46th)		Jaya Bachchan ‡	Nishatbi Ikramullah	Fiza	
2001 (46th)		Aishwarya Rai	Megha Shankar	Mohabbatein	
2001 (46th)		Mahima Chaudhry	Sheetal Varma	Dhadkan	
2001 (46th)		Rani Mukerji	Pooja Oberoi	Har Dil Jo Pyar Karega	
2001 (46th)		Sonali Kulkarni	Neelima Khan	Mission Kashmir	
2002 (47th)		Jaya Bachchan ‡	Nandini Raichand	Kabhi Khushi Kabhie Gham	
2002 (47th)		Kareena Kapoor	Pooja 'Poo' Sharma	Kabhi Khushi Kabhie Gham	
2002 (47th)		Madhuri Dixit	Janki	Lajja	
2002 (47th)		Preity Zinta	Madhubala	Chori Chori Chupke Chupke	
2002 (47th)		Rekha	Ramdulaari	Lajja	
2003 (48th)		Madhuri Dixit ‡	Chandramukhi	Devdas	
2003 (48th)		Antara Mali	Kannu	Company	
2003 (48th)		Kirron Kher	Sumitra Chakraborty	Devdas	
2003 (48th)		Shilpa Shetty	Vaijanti	Rishtey	
2003 (48th)		Sushmita Sen	Sia Sheth	Filhaal...	
2004 (49th)		Jaya Bachchan ‡	Jennifer Kapur	Kal Ho Naa Ho	
2004 (49th)		Priyanka Chopra	Jiya Singhania	Andaaz	
2004 (49th)		Rekha	Sonia Mehra	Koi... Mil Gaya	
2004 (49th)		Shabana Azmi	Rukhsana Jamal	Tehzeeb	
2004 (49th)		Shenaz Treasurywala	Alisha Sahay	Ishq Vishk	
2005 (50th)		Rani Mukerji ‡	Sashi Singh	Yuva	
2005 (50th)		Amrita Rao	Sanjana Bakshi	Main Hoon Na	
2005 (50th)		Divya Dutta	Shabana 'Shabbo' Ibrahim	Veer-Zaara	
2005 (50th)		Rani Mukerji	Saamiya Siddiqui	Veer-Zaara	
2005 (50th)		Priyanka Chopra	Sonia Roy	Aitraaz	
2006 (51st)		Ayesha Kapur ‡	Michelle McNally	Black	
2006 (51st)		Bipasha Basu	Bobby	No Entry	
2006 (51st)		Sandhya Mridul	Pearl Sequeira	Page 3	
2006 (51st)		Shefali Shah	Sumitra Thakur	Waqt: The Race Against Time	
2006 (51st)		Shweta Prasad	Khadija	Iqbal	
2007 (52nd)		Konkona Sen Sharma ‡	Indu Tyagi	Omkara	
2007 (52nd)		Kirron Kher	Mitro	Rang De Basanti	
2007 (52nd)		Kirron Kher	Kamaljit "Kamal" Saran	Kabhi Alvida Naa Kehna	
2007 (52nd)		Preity Zinta	Rhea Saran	Kabhi Alvida Naa Kehna	
2007 (52nd)		Rekha	Sonia Mehra	Krrish	
2007 (52nd)		Soha Ali Khan	Sonia/Durgawati Devi Vohra	Rang De Basanti	
2008 (53rd)		Konkona Sen Sharma ‡	Shruti Ghosh	Life in a... Metro	
2008 (53rd)		Konkona Sen Sharma	Shubhavari 'Chutki' Sahay	Laaga Chunari Mein Daag	
2008 (53rd)		Rani Mukerji	Gulabji	Saawariya	
2008 (53rd)		Shilpa Shukla	Bindya Naik	Chak De! India	
2008 (53rd)		Tisca Chopra	Maya Awasthi	Taare Zameen Par	
2009 (54th)		Kangana Ranaut ‡	Shonali Gujral	Fashion	
2009 (54th)		Bipasha Basu	Radhika/Shreya Rathod	Bachna Ae Haseeno	
2009 (54th)		Jiah Khan	Sunita Kalantri	Ghajini	
2009 (54th)		Kirron Kher	Mrs. Acharya	Dostana	
2009 (54th)		Ratna Pathak Shah	Savitri Rathore	Jaane Tu... Ya Jaane Na	
2009 (54th)		Shahana Goswami	Debbie Mascarenhas	Rock On!!	

=== 2010s ===
Year	Photos of winners	Actor	Role(s)	Film	Ref
2010 (55th)		Kalki Koechlin ‡	Chanda	Dev.D	
2010 (55th)		Arundhati Nag	Bhumi Bhardwaj	Paa	
2010 (55th)		Dimple Kapadia	Neena Walia	Luck by Chance	
2010 (55th)		Divya Dutta	Jalebi	Delhi-6	
2010 (55th)		Shahana Goswami	Muneera	Firaaq	
2010 (55th)		Supriya Pathak	Sarita Mehra	Wake Up Sid	
2011 (56th)		Kareena Kapoor ‡	Shreya Arora	We Are Family	
2011 (56th)		Amrita Puri	Shefali Thakur	Aisha	
2011 (56th)		Prachi Desai	Mumtaz	Once Upon a Time in Mumbaai	
2011 (56th)		Ratna Pathak Shah	Geeta 'Guddi' Patnaik	Golmaal 3	
2011 (56th)		Supriya Pathak	Hansa Praful Parekh	Khichdi: The Movie	
2012 (57th)		Rani Mukerji ‡	Meera Gaity	No One Killed Jessica	
2012 (57th)		Juhi Chawla	Megha	I Am	
2012 (57th)		Kalki Koechlin	Natasha Arora	Zindagi Na Milegi Dobara	
2012 (57th)		Parineeti Chopra	Dimple Chaddha	Ladies vs Ricky Bahl	
2012 (57th)		Swara Bhaskar	Payal	Tanu Weds Manu	
2013 (58th)		Anushka Sharma ‡	Akira Rai	Jab Tak Hai Jaan	
2013 (58th)		Huma Qureshi	Mohsina Hamid	Gangs Of Wasseypur	
2013 (58th)		Illeana D'Cruz	Shruti Ghosh Sengupta	Barfi!	
2013 (58th)		Rani Mukerji	Roshni Shekhawat	Talaash: The Answer Lies Within	
2013 (58th)		Richa Chaddha	Nagma Khatoon	Gangs Of Wasseypur	
2014 (59th)		Supriya Pathak ‡	Dhankor 'Baa' Sanera	Goliyon Ki Raasleela Ram-Leela	
2014 (59th)		Divya Dutta	Ishri Kaur	Bhaag Milkha Bhaag	
2014 (59th)		Kalki Koechlin	Aditi Mehra	Yeh Jawaani Hai Deewani	
2014 (59th)		Kangana Ranaut	Kaya	Krrish 3	
2014 (59th)		Konkona Sen Sharma	Diana	Ek Thi Daayan	
2014 (59th)		Swara Bhaskar	Bindiya Tripathi	Raanjhanaa	
2015 (60th)		Tabu ‡	Ghazala Meer	Haider	
2015 (60th)		Amrita Singh	Kavita Malhotra	2 States	
2015 (60th)		Dimple Kapadia	Rosalina 'Rosie' Eucharistica	Finding Fanny	
2015 (60th)		Juhi Chawla	Sumitra Devi	Gulaab Gang	
2015 (60th)		Lisa Haydon	Vijayalakshmi	Queen	
2016 (61st)		Priyanka Chopra ‡	Kashibai	Bajirao Mastani	
2016 (61st)		Anushka Sharma	Farah Ali	Dil Dhadakne Do	
2016 (61st)		Shefali Shah	Neelam Mehra	Dil Dhadakne Do	
2016 (61st)		Huma Qureshi	Janki 'Jhimli' Dagaonkar	Badlapur	
2016 (61st)		Tabu	Inspector General Meera Deshmukh	Drishyam	
2016 (61st)		Tanvi Azmi	Radhabai	Bajirao Mastani	
2017 (62nd)		Shabana Azmi ‡	Rama Bhanot	Neerja	
2017 (62nd)		Kareena Kapoor Khan	Dr. Preet Sahni	Udta Punjab	
2017 (62nd)		Kirti Kulhari	Falak Ali	Pink	
2017 (62nd)		Ratna Pathak Shah	Sunita Kapoor	Kapoor & Sons	
2017 (62nd)		Richa Chaddha	Sukhpreet Kaur	Sarbjit	
2018 (63rd)		Meher Vij ‡	Najma Malik	Secret Superstar	
2018 (63rd)		Ratna Pathak Shah	Usha 'Rosy' Buaji	Lipstick Under My Burkha	
2018 (63rd)		Seema Bhargava Pahwa	Susheela Mishra	Bareilly Ki Barfi	
2018 (63rd)		Seema Bhargava Pahwa	Mrs. Joshi	Shubh Mangal Saavdhan	
2018 (63rd)		Tillotama Shome	Bonnie Bakshi	A Death in the Gunj	
2019 (64th)		Surekha Sikri ‡	Durga Devi Kaushik	Badhaai Ho	
2019 (64th)		Gitanjali Rao	Prof. Vidya Iyer	October	
2019 (64th)		Katrina Kaif	Babita Kumari	Zero	
2019 (64th)		Shikha Talsania	Meera Kaur Stinson	Veere Di Wedding	
2019 (64th)		Swara Bhaskar	Sakshi Soni	Veere Di Wedding	
2019 (64th)		Yamini Das	Nimmo Sharma	Sui Dhaaga	

=== 2020s ===
Year	Photos of winners	Actor	Role(s)	Film	Ref
2020 (65th)		Amruta Subhash ‡	Razia Ahmed	Gully Boy	
2020 (65th)		Amrita Singh	Rani Kaur	Badla	
2020 (65th)		Kamini Kaushal	Sadhna Kaur (Dadi)	Kabir Singh	
2020 (65th)		Madhuri Dixit	Bahaar Begum	Kalank	
2020 (65th)		Seema Pahwa	Aanra (Mausi)	Bala	
2020 (65th)		Zaira Wasim	Aisha Chaudhary	The Sky Is Pink	
2021 (66th)		Farrukh Jaffar ‡	Fatima Begum	Gulabo Sitabo	
2021 (66th)		Maanvi Gagroo	Rajni "Goggle" Tripathi	Shubh Mangal Zyada Saavdhan	
2021 (66th)		Neena Gupta	Sunaina Tripathi	Shubh Mangal Zyada Saavdhan	
2021 (66th)		Richa Chadha	Meenal "Meenu" Singh	Panga	
2021 (66th)		Tanvi Azmi	Sulakshana Sabharwal	Thappad	
2022 (67th)		Sai Tamhankar ‡	Shama	Mimi	
2022 (67th)		Kirti Kulhari	Inspector Dalbir Kaur Bagga	The Girl on the Train	
2022 (67th)		Konkona Sen Sharma	Seema	Ramprasad Ki Tehrvi	
2022 (67th)		Meghna Malik	Usha Rani Nehwal	Saina	
2022 (67th)		Neena Gupta	Aunty "Meenu" Singh	Sandeep Aur Pinky Faraar	
2023 (68th)		Sheeba Chaddha ‡	Mrs. Thakur	Badhaai Do	
2023 (68th)		Mouni Roy	Junoon	Brahmāstra: Part One – Shiva	
2023 (68th)		Neetu Kapoor	Geeta Saini	Jugjugg Jeeyo	
2023 (68th)		Sheeba Chaddha	Shobha Gupta	Doctor G	
2023 (68th)		Shefali Shah	Dr. Nandini Srivastav	Doctor G	
2023 (68th)		Simran	Meena Narayanan	Rocketry: The Nambi Effect	
2024 (69th)		Shabana Azmi ‡	Jamini Chatterjee	Rocky Aur Rani Kii Prem Kahaani	
2024 (69th)		Jaya Bachchan	Dhanlakshmi Randhawa	Rocky Aur Rani Kii Prem Kahaani	
2024 (69th)		Ratna Pathak Shah	Manpreet Kaur Sethi "Mahi"	Dhak Dhak	
2024 (69th)		Shabana Azmi	Anina's grandmother	Ghoomer	
2024 (69th)		Tripti Dimri	Zoya	Animal	
2024 (69th)		Yami Gautam	Kamini Maheshwari	OMG 2	
2025 (70th)		Chhaya Kadam ‡	Manju	Laapataa Ladies	
2025 (70th)		Ahilya Bamroo	Reya Sen	I Want to Talk	
2025 (70th)		Janki Bodiwala	Jahnvi Rishi	Shaitaan	
2025 (70th)		Madhuri Dixit	Rajkumari Anjulika and ACP Rathore IPS "Mandira"	Bhool Bhulaiyaa 3	
2025 (70th)		Priyamani	Rajeshwari Swaminathan	Article 370	

== Multiple wins and nominations ==
The following individuals have received two or more Best Supporting Actress awards:

Wins	Actress
3	Nirupa Roy, Farida Jalal, Jaya Bachchan, Rani Mukerji, Supriya Pathak
2	Shashikala, Simi Garewal, Raakhee, Rohini Hattangadi, Aruna Irani, Konkona Sen Sharma, Shabana Azmi

The following individuals have received five or more Best Supporting Actress nominations:

Nominations	Actress
10	Aruna Irani
8	Shashikala, Raakhee
7	Bindu, Farida Jalal, Rani Mukerji
6	Rekha
5	Lalita Pawar, Waheeda Rehman, Helen, Supriya Pathak, Ratna Pathak Shah, Tanvi Azmi, Konkona Sen Sharma

== Superlatives ==
Superlative	Actor	Record
Actress with most awards	Nirupa Roy; Farida Jalal; Jaya Bachchan; Rani Mukerji; Supriya Pathak	3
Actress with most nominations	Aruna Irani	10
Actress with most nominations without ever winning	Bindu	7
Actress with most nominations in a single year	Shubha Khote (1961); Shashikala (1966); Nutan (1973); Bindu (1974); Smita Patil (1983); Sushmita Sen (1999); Rani Mukerji (2004); Konkona Sen Sharma (2007); Seema Bhargava Pahwa (2018); Sheeba Chaddha (2022); Shabana Azmi (2023)	2
Oldest winner	Farrukh Jaffar	88
Oldest nominee	Kamini Kaushal	92
Youngest winner	Ayesha Kapur	11
Youngest nominee	Ayesha Kapur	11

- Five actresses: Nirupa Roy, Farida Jalal, Jaya Bachchan, Rani Mukerji and Supriya Pathak share the record for the most awards with three each. Seven actresses have won the award twice; in chronological order, they are Shashikala, Simi Garewal, Raakhee, Rohini Hattangadi, Aruna Irani, Konkona Sen Sharma, and Shabana Azmi.
- Four actresses have won the award in consecutive years: Shashikala (1963–1964), Supriya Pathak (1982–1983), Jaya Bachchan (2001–2002), and Konkona Sen Sharma (2007–2008).
- Aruna Irani holds the record of the most nominations with 10, followed by Raakhee and Shashikala with 8 nominations each, Farida Jalal, Bindu and Rani Mukerji with 7 nominations each, and Rekha with six nominations.
- Shashikala holds the record of most consecutive nominations with 6 between 1963 and 1967, being nominated twice in 1967, winning twice consecutively in 1963 and 1964.
- Eleven actresses share the record for the most nominations in a single year (2). In chronological order, they are: Shubha Khote (1962), Shashikala (1967), Nutan (1974), Bindu (1975), Smita Patil (1984), Sushmita Sen (2000), Rani Mukerji (2005), Konkona Sen Sharma (2008), Seema Bhargava Pahwa (2018), Sheeba Chaddha (2022) and Shabana Azmi (2023). Among these, Sushmita Sen, Rani Mukerji, Konkona Sen Sharma, Sheeba Chaddha and Shabana Azmi won the awards in their respective years. The other six thus hold the record of not winning despite having multiple nominations, in a particular year.
- Bindu holds the record of maximum nominations without ever winning, with 7, followed by Waheeda Rehman and Tanvi Azmi with 5 nominations, and Reema Lagoo and Ratna Pathak Shah with 4 nominations each.
- Farrukh Jaffar, in 2021, became the eldest winner at age 88, winning for Gulabo Sitabo (2020), whilst Ayesha Kapur, in 2006, became the youngest winner and youngest nominee, at age 11, winning for Black (2005). Kamini Kaushal, in 2020, became the eldest nominee at age 93 for her role in Kabir Singh (2019).
- Karisma Kapoor and Kareena Kapoor are the only siblings who have both won the award.
- There was no repeat winner in the 1950s, on the contrary in the '60s three actresses had two wins, namely, Nirupa Roy, Shashikala and Simi Garewal. Again, '70s had no repeat wins, but Supriya Pathak achieved two consecutive wins in the '80s. Farida Jalal followed suit with two wins in the '90s. Jaya Bachchan took over in the 2000s with three wins. There were no repeat winners in the 2010s. Until now, no one is leading in the 2020s. * Chandramukhi is the only charector for the movie Devdas Vyjayanthimala and Madhuri Dixit won the award for best supporting actress same roll Chandramukhi
- Vyjayanthimala was the first actress to win both Best Actress and Best Supporting Actress. She was also the first person to refuse a Filmfare Award for her role in Devdas (1955), which then followed by Reena Roy for her role in Apnapan (1977). Both refused it citing that their roles were leading and not supporting.
- Only once have siblings been nominated for the award during the same year: Ratna Pathak and Supriya Pathak in 2011.
- 14 actresses who have won both Best Actress and Best Supporting Actress awards include Vyjayanthimala, Raakhee, Padmini Kolhapure, Nutan, Dimple Kapadia, Rekha, Karisma Kapoor, Jaya Bachchan, Madhuri Dixit, Rani Mukerji, Kareena Kapoor, Kangana Ranaut, Priyanka Chopra and Shabana Azmi. Mukerji is the first and only actress to win both these awards in the same year (2005).
- Two actresses were nominated for both Best Actress and Best Supporting Actress awards for the same performance: Nutan for Saudagar (1974) and for Main Tulsi Tere Aangan Ki (1979) and Raakhee for Doosra Aadmi (1978); Nutan won Best Actress award for Main Tulsi Tere Aangan Ki (1979).
- Rani Mukerji is the overall most nominated performer in the female acting categories, with 21 nominations overall. Mukerji has 11 for Best Actress and 7 for Best Supporting Actress. and 3 nominations for Best Actress Critics.
- Kareena Kapoor and Priyanka Chopra are the only two actresses to win Filmfare Awards in five different categories. Both actresses have won Best Actress, Best Supporting Actress and Best Female Debut awards once each. Kapoor won twice, while Chopra won once in the Best Actress (Critics) category. Kapoor and Chopra also won one Special Award, one Best Villain Award, respectively. Kapoor and Chopra, thus have 6 and 5 Filmfare Awards respectively.

== See also ==
- Filmfare Awards
- Bollywood
- Cinema of India
