= Taarikh =

Indian Assamese-language drama film

Taarikh is a 2024 Indian Assamese-language drama film directed by Himjyoti Talukdar under the banner of Enajori Talkies, starring Arun Nath and Boloram Das in pivotal roles. The film premiered at the 22nd Chennai International Film Festival and was also officially selected for the 23rd Pune International Film Festival.

== Plot ==
The city of Guwahati witnesses 70-year-old Durlov Dutta’s heart-rending tale of loneliness and sorrow. A tragedy in 2008 shattered his world, fracturing his mental balance and leaving him trapped in the past. While time moved on, Durlov remained frozen in grief. Enter Anuran Hazarika, an empathetic journalist drawn to Durlov’s plight. Determined to free him from sorrow, Anuran unravels the layers of pain and buried secrets that haunt the old man. Through heartfelt conversations and investigations, he pieces together Durlov’s past-once filled with love and dreams, now reduced to shadows.

== Cast ==
- Arun Nath as Durlov Dutta
- Boloram Das as Anuran Hazarika
- Swagata Bharali as Radha
- Kula Kuldeep as Basanta

== Festival Selection ==
- 22nd Chennai International Film Festival
- 23rd Pune International Film Festival
- 17th Habitat Film Festival
- Jagran Film Festival
