= Oass =

- Film poster
- Directed by: Abhinav Shiv Tiwari
- Written by: Prajay Shah (script); Abhay Shetty (script); Aparajit Shukla (dialogue)
- Produced by: Raaj Rahhi; Jimeesh Gandhi; Debasish Bhattacharjee; Zenaida Mastura; Dharmendra Yashovardhan
- Starring: Dibya Chhetri; Priyanka Bose; Yashpal Sharma; Jameel Khan
- Cinematography: Viraj Singh
- Edited by: Pascale Chavance
- Music by: Louis Banks
- Release date: 18 October 2012
- Country: India
- Language: Hindi

Oass (The Dew Drop) is a 2012 Bollywood film directed by Abhinav Shiv Tiwari with Dibya Chhetri, Priyanka Bose and Yashpal Sharma in the lead roles.

The film deals with the theme of human trafficking, focusing particularly on child prostitution. It is based on the real-life story of the abduction of an 11-year-old Nepalese girl who was sold to a brothel in New Delhi by her aunt.

== Plot ==
Kiku, a young girl in a Nepal village, is sent off by her family with an aunt with a promise of better life. The aunt takes her to Delhi selling her to a madam in a brothel where a series of forced sexual encounters follow. Following a murder there, the owner of another brothel takes her along with a child even younger than herself. She is subjected to beatings and torture as her plans to escape are thwarted.

== Cast ==
- Dibya Chhetri as Kiku
- Priyanka Bose as Madam
- Yashpal Sharma as John
- Jameel Khan as Baadu
- Subrat Dutta as Jhukki
- Amit Dhawan as Sujeet
- Sonam Stobgias Gorky as Ganesh
- Barnali Medhi as Putul
- Sneha Thapa as Kiran
- Nicolas Cacciavillani as Wilson
- Anny Sharma as Amreen
- Kiran Sharma as Shobha
- Nidhi Mahawan as Pinky
- Jatin Sarna as Javed
- Tina Bhatia as Vidya
- Shusheela Thapa as Vishakha
- Anamika Tiwari as Rashmi
- Bholu as Bholu

== Accolades ==
Oass was named the best film at the second edition of the Ladakh International Film Festival (LIFF), where it also won the award for best screenplay and Divya Chhetri was named the best actress.
