= Swarda Thigale =

Indian television actress (born 1993)

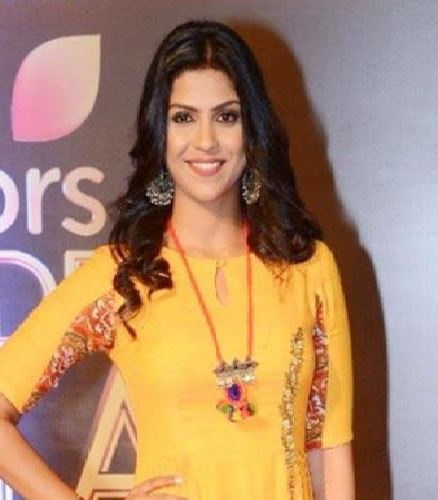
- Born: 29 October 1993 (age 32); Pune, India
- Occupation: Actress
- Years active: 2013–present
- Known for: Savitri Devi College & Hospital; Pyaar Ke Papad
- Spouse: Siddharth Raut (m. 2024)

Swarda Thigale is an Indian television actress who is best known as Dr. Sanchi Malhotra in Savitri Devi College & Hospital and as Shivika Gupta in Pyaar Ke Papad.

== Career ==
Thigale started her career, in 2013, with the lead role in Marathi show Majhe Mann Tujhe Zhale as Shubhra. In 2013, She also made her film debut in Marathi film Thoda Tuza Thoda Maza. In 2017, Thigale debuted in Hindi TV with Savitri Devi College & Hospital opposite Vikram Sakhalkar and Varun Kapoor. Later, she played several lead roles in Hindi TV shows and films.

== Filmography ==
=== Television ===
Year(s)	Title	Role	Ref.
2013–2015	Majhe Man Tujhe Zale	Shubhra	
2017–2018	Savitri Devi College & Hospital	Dr. Sanchi Malhotra (née Mishra)	
2019	Pyaar Ke Papad	Shivika Omkar Gupta (née Mishra)	
2020	Naagin 5	Mayuri	
2021	Shaurya Aur Anokhi Ki Kahani	Shagun Kapoor	
2021–2022	Swarajya Saudamini Tararani	Tarabai	
2025	Premachi Gosht	Mukta Koli	

=== Films ===
Year(s)	Title	Role	Ref.
2013	Thoda Tuza Thoda Maza	Jui	
2020	Welcome Home	Neha	

=== Theatre ===
Year(s)	Title	Role	Ref.
2013	Vadal Hya Krantiche	Ramabai Ambedkar	

== See also ==
- List of Hindi television actresses
- List of Indian television actresses
