= Apurba Sarma =

Indian writer

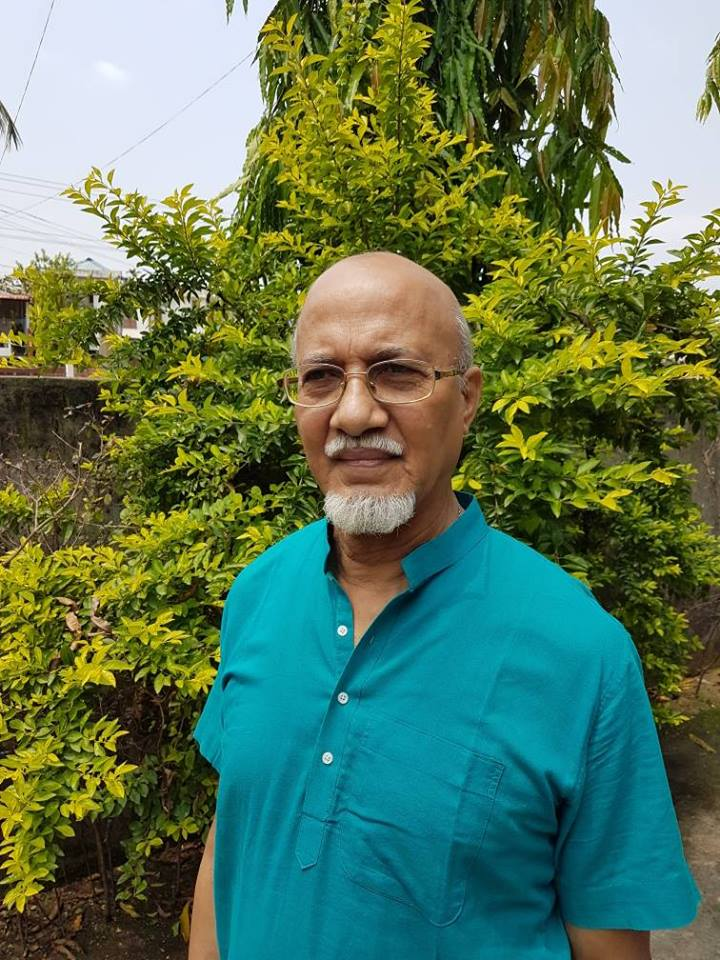
- Occupation: Film Critic
- Writing career
- Notable awards: National Film Award for Best Book on Cinema, Sahitya Akademi Award for Creative Literature in Assamese (in 2000, for "Baghe Tapur Rati", a short story collection)...

Apurba Sarma (born January 1, 1943) is a National Award-winning film critic and a Sahitya Akademi winning author from Halem, Sonitpur district, Assam. He is one of the brothers of Arun Sarma who is also a Sahitya Academy Award winning author. He did his master's in economics at Gauhati University (1965). And later worked as a staff reporter at The Assam Tribune (1965–1967), as lecturer in economics at Nowgong Girls College (1967–1997), as principal, Nowgong Girls College (1997–2002), and as editor of Ajir Asom, an Assamese daily published by The Sentinel (Guwahati). He is presently the founder-president of Xahitya Mancha Asom, a Guwahati-based society of writers and fans of Assamese literature.

== Awards and accolades ==
- Sahitya Akademi Award for Creative Literature in Assamese (2000)
- National Film Award (Swarna Kamal) for Best Book on Cinema (2002)
- Assam Valley Literary Award for Creative Literature (2015)

== Jury member ==
- National Film Award - 2003
- National Film Award – 2007

== Author ==
Books

- Six anthologies of short fiction in Assamese
- Asomiya Chalachitrar Sa-Pohar (Light and Shade on Assamese Cinema)
- The Lone Ranger in a Forsaken Frontier (on the life of the pioneer filmmaker of Indian Cinema in the North East)

Features in journals

- Filming 'Literature' (Deep Focus, Vol. VI 1996)
- An Experience of Oppression in Assamese Cinema (Deep Focus, vol. VII No 3 &4, 1997–98)

== See also ==
- Film Critics Circle of India
