= Ratan Sil Sarma =

Indian film director

- Born: Assam
- Occupation: Film director
- Years active: 2010-present

Ratan Sil Sarma is an Indian film director. He is associated with Assamese Cinema and Hindi Cinema.

== Career ==
He started his career as film editor. He edited the films like Gangs of North East, Dham Dhama Dham and Kokaideu Bindaas. In 2016, he made his directing debut with Assamese film Marksheet for which he received several awards in Prag Cine Awards. In 2020, he directed Hindi film Pepper Chicken.

== Filmography ==
Year	Film	Notes	Language
2020	Pepper Chicken	First Hindi Film	Hindi
2016	Marksheet	Debut Movie	Assamese

== Awards and nominations ==
Year	Award	Category	Result	Ref.
2016	Prag Cine Awards	Best Debut Director	Won	
2016	Prag Cine Awards	Best Director	Nominated	
2016	Prag Cine Awards	Best Lyrics	Nominated	
2016	Prag Cine Awards	Best Film Editing	Nominated	
2016	Prag Cine Awards	Best Screenplay	Nominated	
