= Chalachitram National Film Festival =

Annual film festival in Assam, India

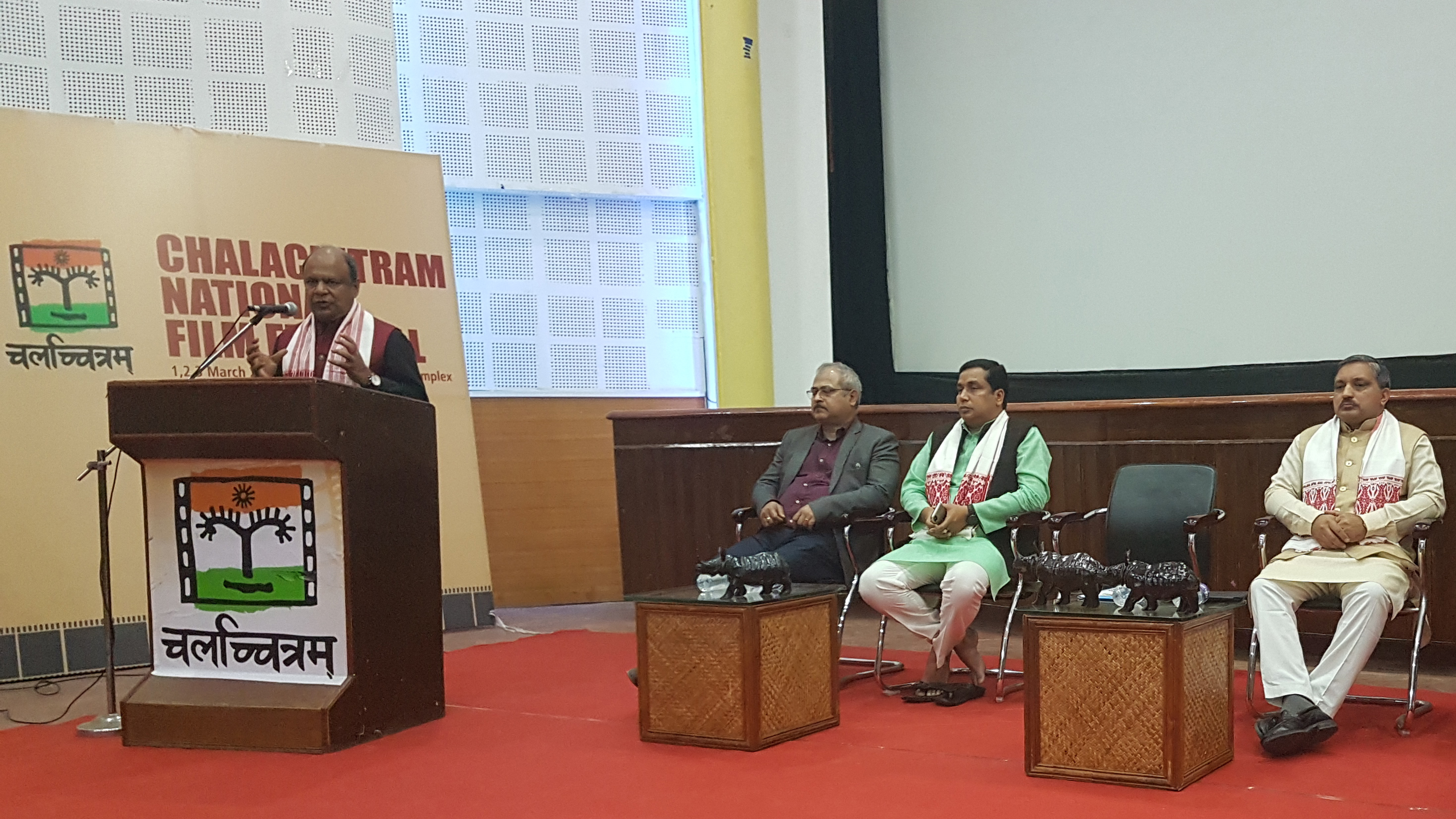
Jury chairperson Rakesh Mittal speaks at CNFF–2019

Chalachitram National Film Festival (CNFF) is a festival conducted by Vishwa Samvad Kendra, Assam. The festival is organized every year. The 9th Edition of the festival will be organized on 25 and 26 October 2025 at the Jyoti Chitraban Complex in Guwahati.

== Society and purpose ==
Chalachitram is a society, founded in 2016 with the primary aim “of taking films closer to the people and of using film as a weapon to create awareness of Indian heritage.

== CNFF 2017 ==
The inaugural edition of the festival took place at Rabindra Bhawan, Textile Institute, and the mass communication department of Cotton College in March 2017 under the name Guwahati Film Festival (GFF). The chairperson of the jury was Bijaya Jena. The other members were film maker Haobam Paban Kumar from Manipur and Dr Abhijit Bora, professor at Tezpur University. Assam culture minister Naba Kumar Doley was the chief guest in the inaugural session and Chief Minister Sarbananda Sonowal was the Chief Guest in the Award ceremony. Gracing the occasion, the chief minister of Assam, Sarbananda Sonowal stated that "cinema reflects the philosophy of life, reality and expectations of society, and plays an important role in transforming society".

He also recalled the contributions of pioneers Rupkonwar Jyoti Prasad Agarwalla and Bhabendra Nath Saikia, and contemporaries such as Jahnu Baruah and Manju Bora in taking the cinema of Assamese forward. Senthil Rajan Director DFF, Vijaya Jena, and Pritom Saikia, the Commissioner and Secretary of the Cultural Affairs Department of the government of Assam were some of the other dignitaries in attendance at the Award Ceremony.

== CNFF 2018 ==
The second edition, GFF-2018, had a jury comprising Ashim Sinha (Chairperson), Nilanjan Datta (FTII), and Tribeni Rai (SRFTI). The Chief Guest of the opening ceremony Dr Manmohan Vaidya speaks about the current status of Indian Film and he requests the upcoming film makers to enrich their films with Indian ethos. Participating as the appointed speaker, Film Maker Dr Santwana Bardoloi stated that "India is not a land of diverse cultures but a unique culture with the capacity to nurture diversities." Naba Kumar Doley and actor-turned-MLA Angurlata Deka, Film maker Manju Bora graced the closing ceremony. A total of 75 films were screened at this 3-day event. A souvenir was released too.

== CNFF 2019 ==
The third edition, in 2019, was rechristened as Chalachitram National Film Festival, had the theme 'Our Heritage, Our Pride', and took place at Jyoti Chitraban Campus. It had a total prize money of 1.5 lacs. Rakesh Mittal (chairperson), Christopher Dalton, and Ujjwal Chatterjee were the members of the jury.

Awards at CNFF-2019

- Best Film – Banwash by Nilesh Yashwant Ambedkar (cash prize of Rs. 1 lac)
- Best Film from the North East – Jaapi by Kripa Kalita (cash prize of Rs. 50,000)
- Jury Special Mention – Daai by Monuj Borkotoky
- Certificate of Merit – Vande Mataram by Swapna Maini
- Certificate of Merit – Xoponar Setu by Ankurjyoti Deka

== CNFF-2020 ==
The fourth edition of the festival was officially launched on October 13, 2019. CNFF 2020, which happened March 6–8, included a panel discussion as well as an award for the best debut film, by the Film Critics Circle of India. It had a total prize money of 1.8 lacs; and a 9-member /all-women jury.
