= List of Indian winners and nominees of the British Academy Film Awards =

Indian winners and nominees of the BAFTAs

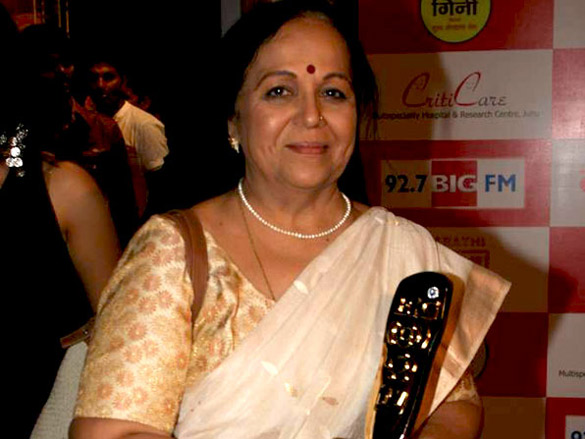
Rohini Hattangadi became the first Indian to win a BAFTA Award for her portrayal of Kasturba Gandhi in Richard Attenborough's Gandhi (1982).

Several Indian individuals and films have received or been nominated for the British Academy Film Awards in different categories. As of 2023, 23 Indians have been nominated, and 6 have won the awards.

At the 36th British Academy Film Awards, Rohini Hattangadi became the first Indian to win a BAFTA Award for Best Actress in a Supporting Role for the film Gandhi (1982). Bhanu Athaiya was nominated for Best Costume Design and Ravi Shankar was nominated for Best Original Music for the same film. As of 2023, three Indian films have been nominated for Best Film from any Source— Pather Panchali (1955), Aparajito (1956), and Apur Sansar (1959), all from Satyajit Ray's Apu Trilogy; and five for Best Film Not in the English Language— Salaam Bombay! (1988), Monsoon Wedding (2001), Devdas (2002), Rang De Basanti (2006), and The Lunchbox (2014). (Note: The Warrior (2001) nominated in this category was a British film in an Indian language (Hindi).)

At the 41st British Academy Film Awards, Saving The Tiger and Man-Eating Tiger (both from 1987) by Naresh Bedi were nominated for Best Documentary; and at the 76th British Academy Film Awards, All That Breathes (2022) by Shaunak Sen and Aman Mann was nominated in the same category.

At the 52nd British Academy Film Awards, Shekhar Kapur was nominated for Best Direction for Elizabeth (1998), which won the award for Outstanding British Film.

Resul Pookutty and A. R. Rahman won the BAFTA for Best Sound and Best Original Music, respectively, for the 2008 British film Slumdog Millionaire. Rahman was also nominated for Best Original Music for 127 Hours (2010).

For his role in the movie Life of Pi (2012), Suraj Sharma received a nomination for Rising Star Award – which, unlike the competitive awards, is publicly voted for, although the nominees are shortlisted by the jury.

Adarsh Gourav was nominated for Best Actor in a Leading Role for The White Tiger (2020).

In 2026, Manipuri film Boong became the first Indian movie to win a BAFTA, which it did by winning in the Best Children's & Family Film category.

== Competitive awards ==
Competitive awards
Year	Nominee(s)/recipient(s)	Film	Category	Result	Ref.
1957 (11th)	Pather Panchali	Pather Panchali	Best Film from any Source	Nominated	
1958 (12th)	Aparajito	Aparajito	Best Film from any Source	Nominated	
1961 (15th)	Apur Sansar	Apur Sansar	Best Film from any Source	Nominated	
1982 (36th)	Rohini Hattangadi	Gandhi	Best Actress in a Supporting Role	Won	
1982 (36th)	Bhanu Athaiya	Gandhi	Best Costume Design	Nominated	
1982 (36th)	Ravi Shankar	Gandhi	Best Original Music	Nominated	
1985 (39th)	Victor Banerjee	A passage to India	Best Actor in a Leading Role	Nominated	
1987 (41st)	Naresh Bedi	Man-Eating Tigers/Saving the Tiger	Best Documentary	Nominated	
1989 (43rd)	(Note: Mira Nair, the director and co-producer of Salaam Bombay! who received the nomination, is Indian-American. The film was co-financed by the National Film Development Corporation of India.)	Salaam Bombay!	Best Film Not in the English Language	Nominated	
1998 (52nd)	Shekhar Kapur	Elizabeth	Best Direction	Nominated	
1998 (52nd)	Shekhar Kapur	Elizabeth	Outstanding British Film	Won	
2001 (55th)	(Note: Mira Nair, the director and co-producer of Monsoon Wedding who received the nomination, is Indian-American. The film was an international co-production between companies in India, the United States, Italy, France, and Germany.)	Monsoon Wedding	Best Film Not in the English Language	Nominated	
2002 (56th)	Sanjay Leela Bhansali Bharat Shah	Devdas	Best Film Not in the English Language	Nominated	
2006 (60th)	Rakeysh Omprakash Mehra Ronnie Screwvala	Rang De Basanti	Best Film Not in the English Language	Nominated	
2008 (62nd)	Freida Pinto	Slumdog Millionaire	Best Actress in a Supporting Role	Nominated	
2008 (62nd)	Resul Pookutty	Slumdog Millionaire	Best Sound	Won	
2008 (62nd)	A. R. Rahman	Slumdog Millionaire	Best Original Music	Won	
2010 (64th)	A. R. Rahman	127 Hours	Best Original Music	Nominated	
2014 (68th)	Ritesh Batra Anurag Kashyap Guneet Monga Arun Rangachari	The Lunchbox	Best Film Not in the English Language	Nominated	
2020 (74th)	Adarsh Gourav	The White Tiger	Best Actor in a Leading Role	Nominated	
2022 (76th)	Shaunak Sen Aman Mann	All That Breathes	Best Documentary	Nominated	
2025 (79th)	Lakshmipriya Devi Ritesh Sidhwani	Boong	Best Children's & Family Film	Won	

== Publicly voted awards ==
Publicly Voted awards
Year	Nominee(s)/recipient(s)	Category	Result	Ref.
2012 (66th)	Suraj Sharma	Rising Star Award	Nominated	

== See also ==
- List of Indian Academy Award winners and nominees
- List of Indian Golden Globe Award winners and nominees
- List of Indian winners and nominees at the Cannes Film Festival
- List of Indian submissions for the Academy Award for Best International Feature Film
- List of Indian Grammy Award winners and nominees
