= List of Indian winners and nominees at the Cannes Film Festival =

Indian Cinema Pavilion
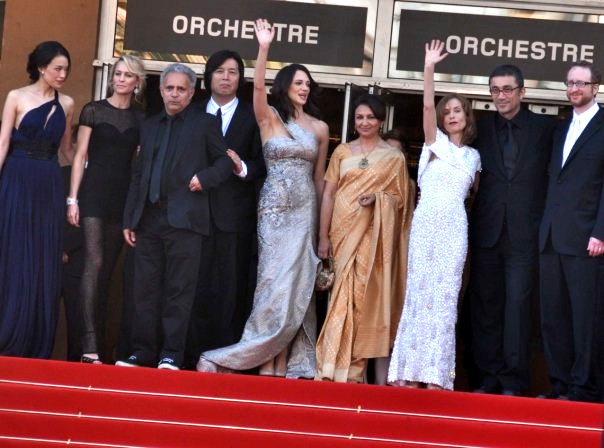
- Indian actress Sharmila Tagore with the International Jury Members at the 62nd Cannes
- Location: Cannes, France

The Cinema of India pavilion has garnered recognition at the Cannes Film Festival since its inception in 1946. The 1946 social-realistic film Neecha Nagar became the first Indian film to gain recognition at the Cannes, after it was awarded Grand Prix du Festival International du Film, the festival's highest prize, at the first Cannes. In 1955, Baby Naaz received Special Mention (child actress) for her work in Boot Polish by Prakash Aurora.

In 1956, Satyajit Ray's Pather Panchali won the Best Human Document Award. In the same year Gotoma the Buddha by Rajbans Khanna, won Special mention for Best direction. In 1983 Mrinal Sen's directorial Kharij, won the Jury Prize. In 1988, Mira Nair's Oscar Nominated film Salaam Bombay! won the Caméra d'Or ("Golden Camera"). In 1989, Shaji N. Karun's, Piravi has garnered the Caméra d'Or - Mention Spéciale. The 1999 film Marana Simhasanam directed by Murali Nair also received the Caméra d'Or.

On the occasion of 100 Years of Indian Cinema, India was the Official Guest Country at the 66th Cannes. The first Incredible India Exhibition, a joint participation of the Ministry of Tourism and Ministry of Information and Broadcasting, Republic of India was inaugurated by Indian actor Chiranjeevi.

== Competitive awards ==
Year	Nominee(s)/recipient(s)	Film	Category	Result	Ref.
1946 (1st)	Chetan Anand	Neecha Nagar	Grand Prix du Festival International du Film	Won	
1952 (5th)	V. Shantaram	Amar Bhoopali	Grand Prix	Nominated	
1953 (6th)	Raj Kapoor	Awaara	Grand Prix	Nominated	
1954 (7th)	Bimal Roy	Do Bigha Zamin	International Prize	Won	
1955 (8th)	Baby Naaz	Boot Polish	Special Mention - Child Artist	Won	
1956 (9th)	Satyajit Ray	Pather Panchali	Best Human Document Award	Won	
1957 (10th)	Rajbans Khanna	Gotoma the Buddha	Special Mention (Short Film) - Director	Won	
1957 (10th)	Rajbans Khanna	Gotoma the Buddha	Palme d'Or (Short)	Nominated	
1958 (11th)	Satyajit Ray	Parash Pathar	Palme d'Or	Nominated	
1962 (15th)	Satyajit Ray	Devi	Palme d'Or	Nominated	
1974 (27th)	M. S. Sathyu	Garm Hava	Grand Prix du Festival International du Film	Nominated	
1983 (36th)	Mrinal Sen	Kharij	Jury Prize	Won	
1983 (36th)	Mrinal Sen	Kharij	Palme d'Or	Nominated	
1984 (37th)	Satyajit Ray	Ghare Baire	Palme d'Or	Nominated	
1988 (41st)	Mira Nair	Salaam Bombay!	Caméra d'Or; Audience Award	Won	
1989 (42nd)	Shaji N. Karun	Piravi	Caméra d'Or — Mention Spéciale	Won	
1991 (44th)	Deepa Mehta	Sam & Me	Caméra d'Or — Mention Spéciale	Won	
1991 (44th)	Aribam Syam Sharma	Ishanou	Un Certain Regard Award	Nominated	
1994 (47th)	Shaji N. Karun	Swaham	Palme d'Or	Nominated	
1994 (47th)	Sandip Ray	Uttoran	Un Certain Regard Award	Nominated	
1999 (52nd)	Murali Nair	Marana Simhasanam	Caméra d'Or	Won	
2002 (55th)	Manish Jha	A Very Very Silent Film	Jury Prize (Short Film)	Won	
2006 (61st)	Gitanjali Rao	Printed Rainbow	Grand Rail d’Or Audience Award; Kodak Discovery Award; Young Critics Award for Best Short Film	Won	
2013 (66th)	Ritesh Batra	The Lunchbox	Grand Rail d’Or Audience Award	Won	
2013 (66th)	Karan Johar	Ajeeb Dastaan Hai Yeh (Bombay Talkies)	Queer Palm	Nominated	
2014 (67th)	Kanu Behl	Titli	Caméra d'Or	Nominated	
2015 (68th)	Neeraj Ghaywan	Masaan	FIPRESCI Prize (Un Certain Regard); Prix de l'Avenir (Un Certain Regard)	Won	
2015 (68th)	Gurvinder Singh	Chauthi Koot	Un Certain Regard Award	Nominated	
2016 (69th)	Shirley Abraham; Amit Madheshiya	The Cinema Travelers	L'Œil d'or Special Mention	Won	
2018 (71st)	Nandita Das	Manto	Un Certain Regard Award	Nominated	
2020 (73rd)	Ashmita Guha Neogi	CatDog	Cinéfondation Premier Prix	Won	
2021 (74th)	Payal Kapadia	A Night of Knowing Nothing	Golden Eye	Won	
2021 (74th)	Payal Kapadia	A Night of Knowing Nothing	Caméra d'Or	Nominated	
2022 (75th)	Shaunak Sen	All That Breathes	Golden Eye	Won	
2024 (77th)	Payal Kapadia	All We Imagine as Light	Palme d'Or	Nominated	
2024 (77th)	Payal Kapadia	All We Imagine as Light	Grand Prix	Won	
2024 (77th)	Chidananda S Naik	Sunflowers were the first ones to know…	La Cinef (Premier Prix)	Won	
2024 (77th)	Anasuya Sengupta	The Shameless	Best Actress (Un Certain Regard)	Won	

== Technical awards ==
Year	Nominee(s)/recipient(s)	Craft	Category	Result	Ref.
1952 (5th)	V. Shantaram	Direction	Technical Grand Prize	Won	
2019 (72nd)	Modhura Palit	Cinematography	Pierre Angénieux Excellens-Promising Cinematographer	Won	
2024 (77th)	Santosh Sivan	Cinematography	Pierre Angénieux Tribute in Cinematography	Won	

== Indian Jury Members at Cannes ==
Year	Name	Note(s)
35th	Mrinal Sen	Director
43rd	Mira Nair	Director
53rd	Arundhati Roy	Writer
56th	Aishwarya Rai	Actress
58th	Nandita Das	Actress and Director
62nd	Sharmila Tagore	Actress
63rd	Shekhar Kapur	Director
66th	Vidya Balan	Actress
75th	Deepika Padukone	Actress
76th	Meenakshi Shedde	Film critic
78th	Payal Kapadia	Director

== Special events and honors ==
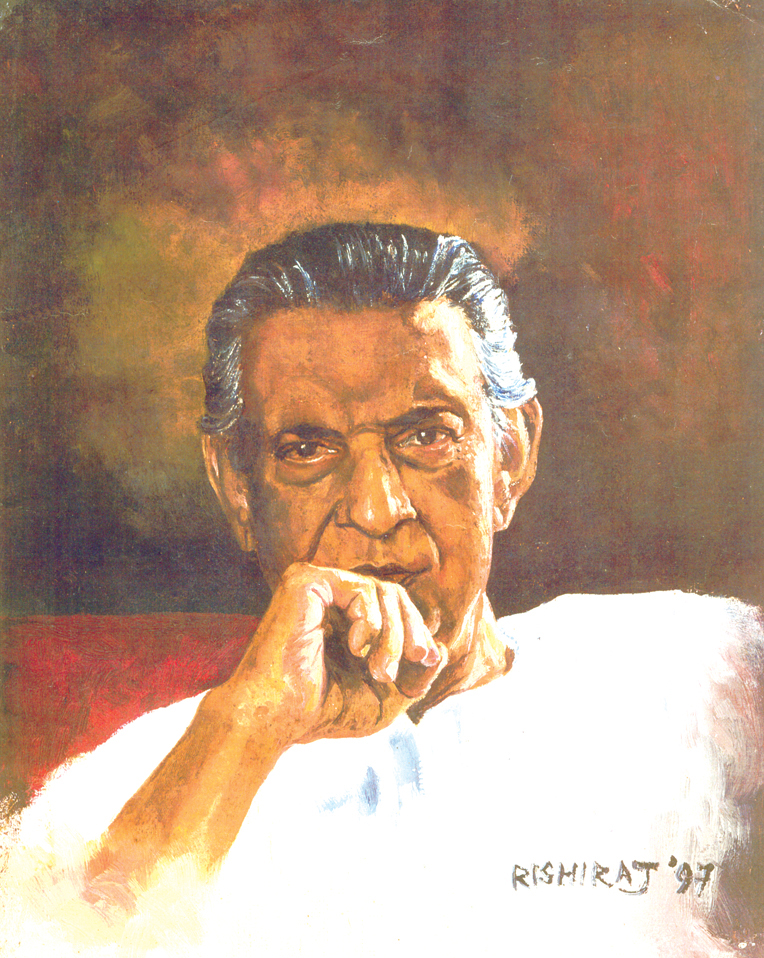
Satyajit Ray's works Pather Panchali, Charulata, and Pratidwandi have been part of the Cannes Classics.

=== Hommage à Satyajit Ray (1982) ===
At the 35th Cannes, Satyajit Ray received the 35th Anniversary Trophy signed by Igor Mitoraj, and an Hommage à Satyajit Ray was hosted in his honour.

=== Tous Les Cinemas du Monde (2007) ===
Tous Les Cinemas du Monde (World Cinema) began in 2005 to showcase films from a variety of different countries. At the 60th Cannes, the first two days of this program held during 19 May to 25 May 2007 featured special screening of Indian films; Saira (2005), Missed Call (2005), Lage Raho Munna Bhai (2006), Dosar (2006), Veyil (2006), Guru (2007), Goal (2007), and Dharm (2007).

=== Official Guest Country (2013) ===
India was the Official Guest Country at the 66th Cannes. The event featured special screening of Indian films; Bombay Talkies (Gala screenings), Monsoon Shootout (Midnight screenings), Charulata (Cannes classics), Bollywood: The Greatest Love Story Ever Told (Beach screenings), The Lunchbox (Critic's week), Ugly (Director's fortnight), Eega (Film market), and Tau Seru (Shorts).

=== Country of Honor - Marché du Film (2022) ===
On the occasion of 75 years of diplomatic ties between India and France, India was announced as the Official Country of Honour at the 2022 Cannes Film Market. The first of its kind event featured special beach screenings of Six Indian feature films; Pratidwandi (1970), Godavari (2021), Alpha Beta Gamma (2021), Rocketry: The Nambi Effect (2022), Dhuin (2022), Boomba Ride (2022), and Nirae Thathakalulla Maramy (2022).

Under the Goes to Cannes Section; five parallel films were featured in the Work in Progress Lab - Baghjan by Jaicheng Jai Dohutia; Bailadila by Shailendra Sahu; Ek Jagah Apni (A Space of Our Own) by Ektara Collective; Follower by Harshad Nalawade; Shivamma by Jai Shankar. In addition, India - Content Hub of the World Pavilion was inaugurated at the venue on 18 May 2022.

=== Cannes XR ===
Cannes XR is a program from the Marché du Film dedicated to immersive technologies and cinematographic content

- 2017 - Indian epic film duology Baahubali was featured at the VR exhibition.
- 2022 - Indian virtual reality film Le Musk was featured at the VR exhibition.

=== World Classic (2023) ===
In 2023, Ishanou (Meitei for 'The Chosen One'), a 1990 Meitei language film, was recognised as a "World Classic" by the Cannes Film Festival 2023 and it was the only film selected from India for the event for that year. In the past, it was featured in the Un Certain Regard section of the 1991 Cannes Film Festival.

== Gallery ==
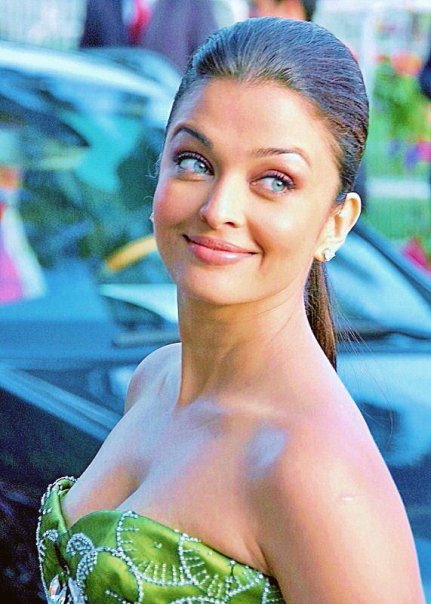
Aishwarya Rai Bachchan at 2008 Cannes

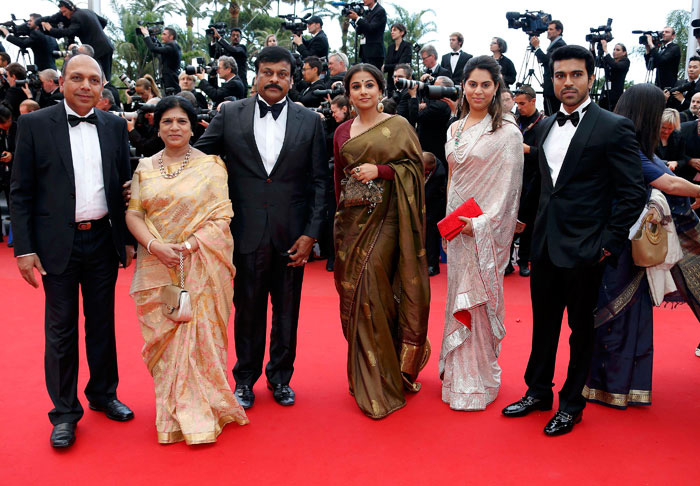
Chiranjeevi, Vidya Balan, and Ram Charan at 2013 Cannes

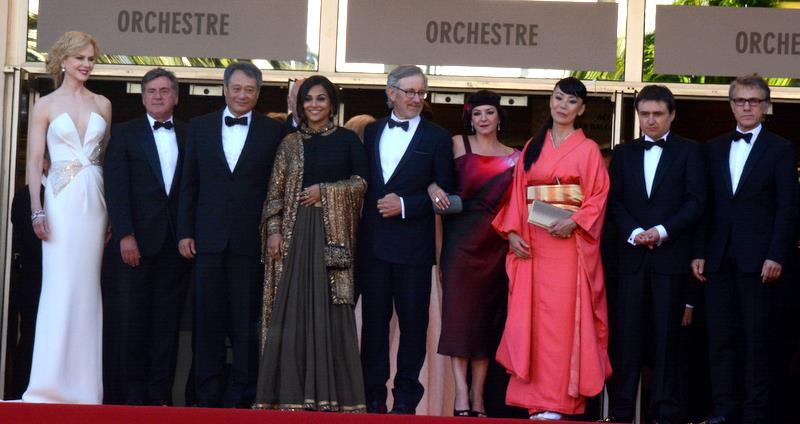
Vidya Balan with fellow jury members at 2013 Cannes

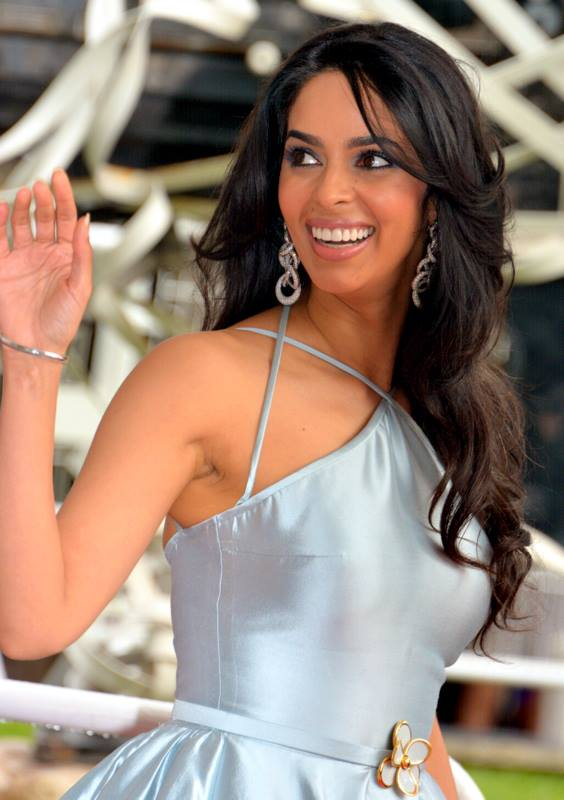
Mallika Sherawat at 2016 Cannes

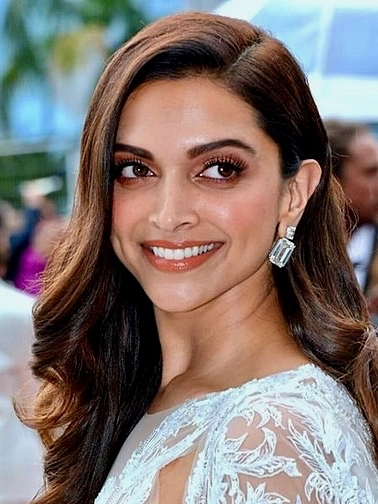
Deepika Padukone at 2018 Cannes

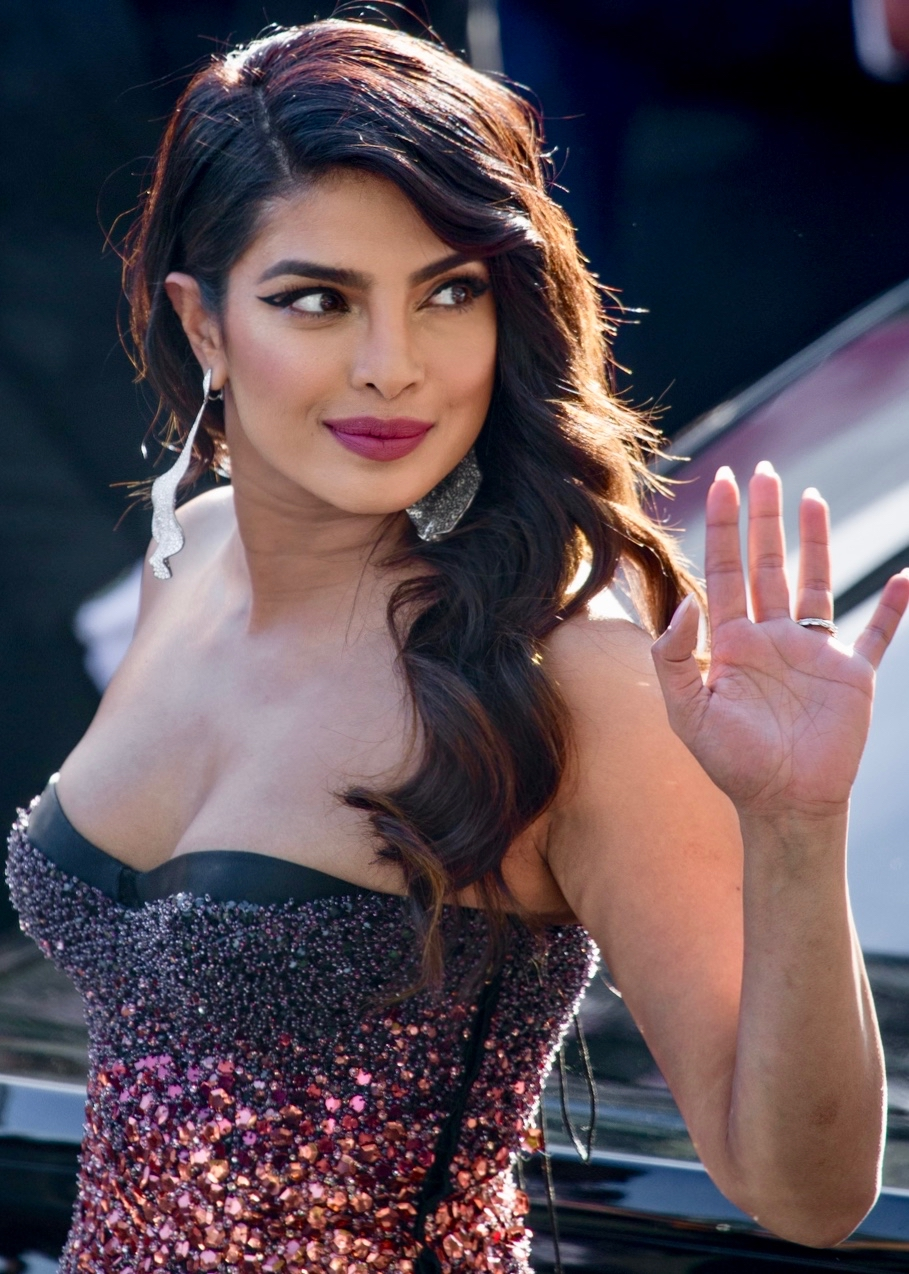
Priyanka Chopra at 2019 Cannes

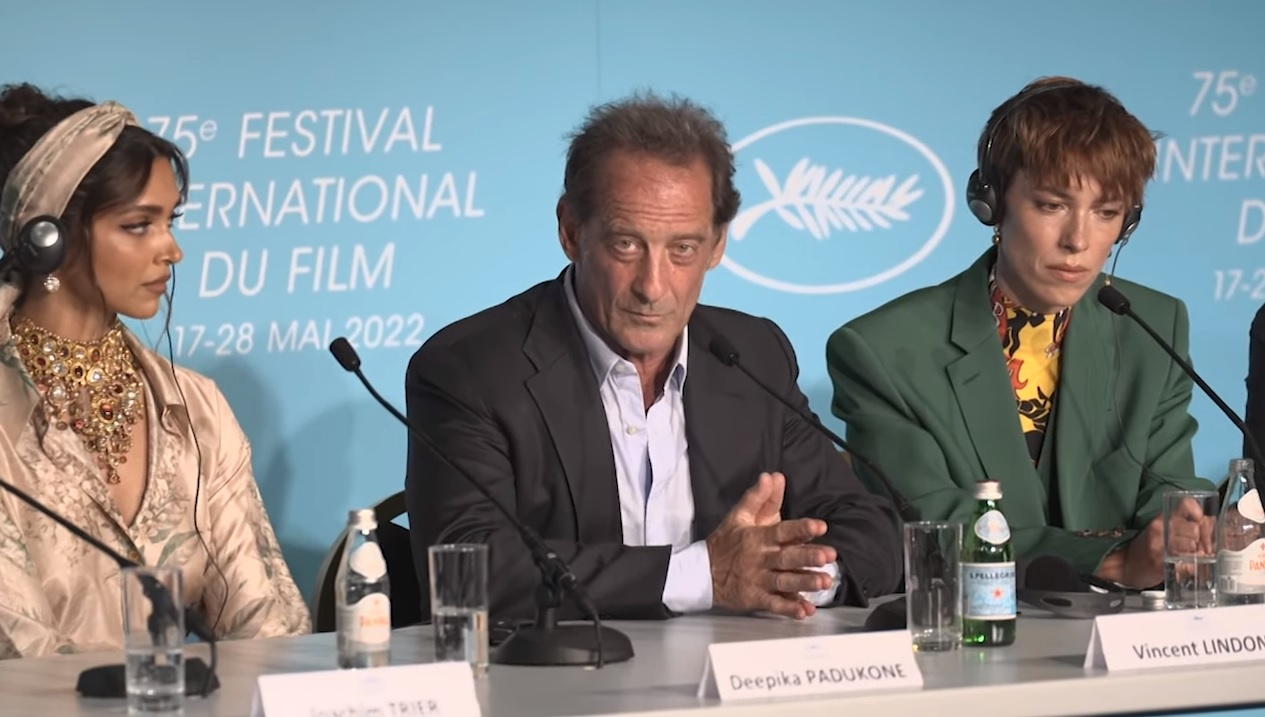
Deepika Padukone with fellow jury members Vincent Lindon and Rebecca Hall at 2022 Cannes

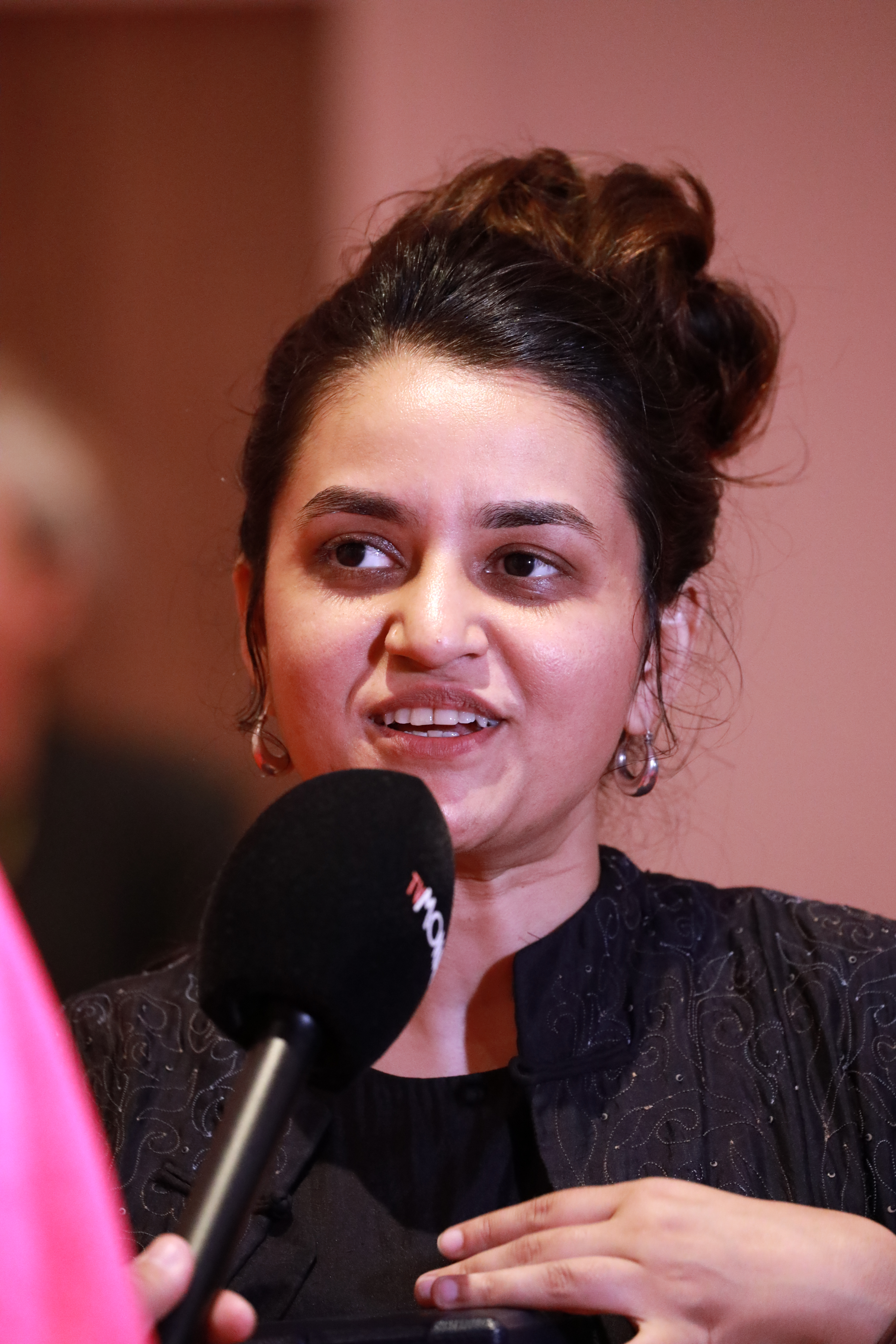
Payal Kapadia at 2024 Cannes

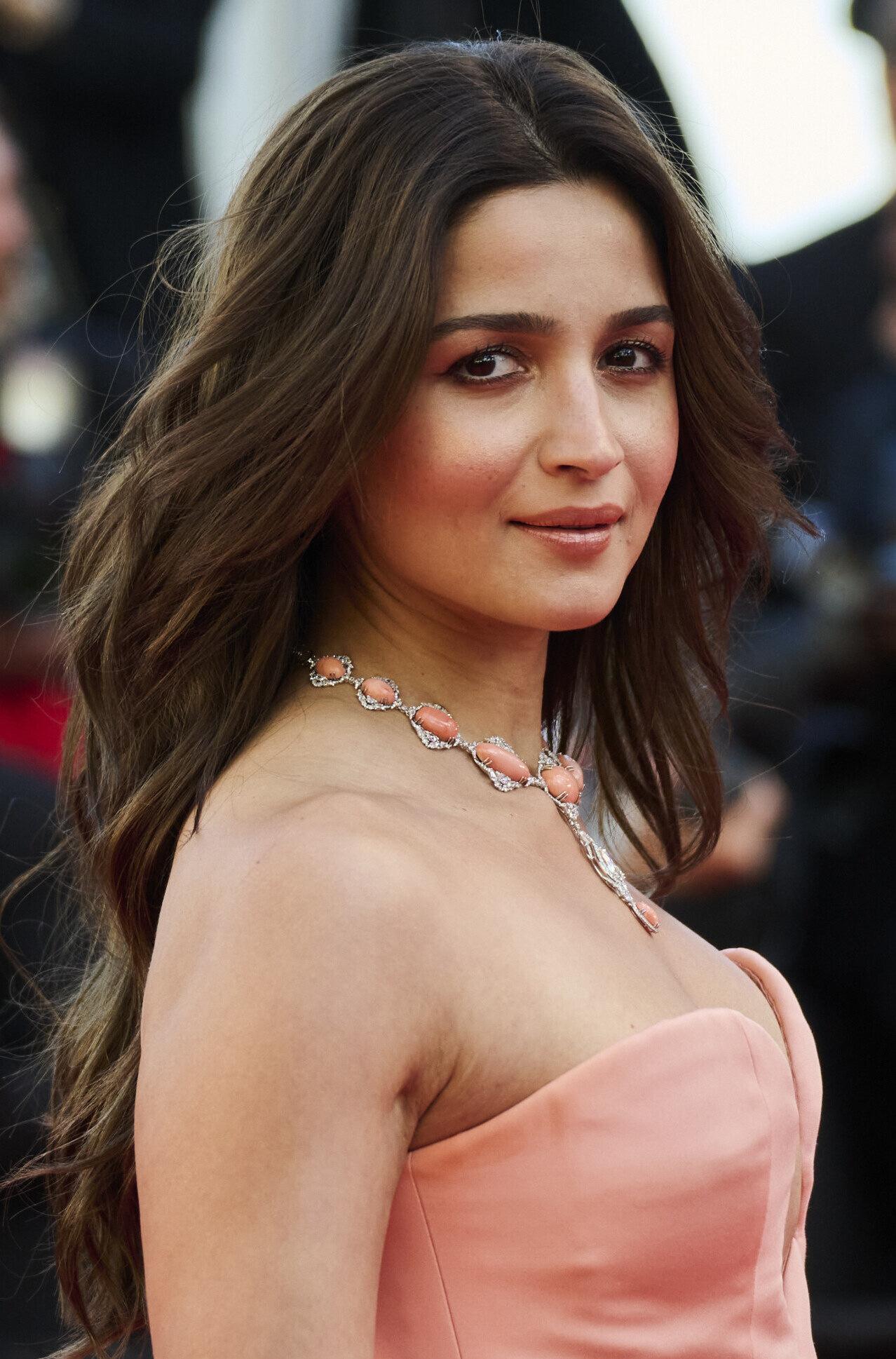
Alia Bhatt at 2026 Cannes

== See also ==
- List of Indian Academy Award winners and nominees
- List of Indian Golden Globe Award winners and nominees
- List of Indian winners and nominees of the British Academy Film Awards
- List of Indian submissions for the Academy Award for Best International Feature Film
- List of Indian Grammy Award winners and nominees
