= List of Indian Golden Globe Award winners and nominees =

Various Indian artists and films have received or been nominated for the Golden Globe Awards in different categories. At the 16th Golden Globe Awards, V. Shantaram's 1957 Hindi-language film Do Aankhen Barah Haath (Two Eyes, Twelve Hands) won the Samuel Goldwyn International Film Award. At the 40th Golden Globe Awards 1982 English-language biographical film Gandhi, an international co-production between NFDC India and the United Kingdom, won Golden Globe for Best Foreign Film.

At the 66th Golden Globe Awards, Indian composer A. R. Rahman won the Best Original Score for Slumdog Millionaire. At the 80th Golden Globe Awards, the Telugu language film RRR got nominated for two categories including Best Non-English Language Film; and the Indian composer M. M. Keeravani and lyricist Chandrabose won the Best Original Song for "Naatu Naatu".

== Awards and nominations ==
Year	Nominee(s)/recipient(s)	Film	Category	Result	Ref.
1959 (16th)	V. Shantaram	Do Aankhen Barah Haath	Samuel Goldwyn International Film Award	Won	
1989 (46th)	Mira Nair	Salaam Bombay!	Best Foreign Film	Nominated	
2002 (59th)	Mira Nair	Monsoon Wedding	Best Foreign Film	Nominated	
2009 (66th)	A. R. Rahman	Slumdog Millionaire	Best Original Score	Won	
2023 (80th)	S. S. Rajamouli; D. V. V. Danayya	RRR	Best Non-English Language Film	Nominated	
2023 (80th)	M. M. Keeravani; Chandrabose	RRR	Best Original Song (For "Naatu Naatu")	Won	
2025 (82nd)	Payal Kapadia	All We Imagine as Light	Best Director	Nominated	
2025 (82nd)	Payal Kapadia	All We Imagine as Light	Best Foreign Film	Nominated	

== Golden Globes Horizon Awards ==
Alia Bhatt was honored with the inaugural Golden Globes Horizon Award at the 5th Red Sea International Film Festival in Jeddah, Saudi Arabia, in December 2025. This award recognizes her significant contributions to global cinema and emerging talent.

== See also ==
- List of Indian Academy Award winners and nominees
- List of Indian winners and nominees of the British Academy Film Awards
- List of Indian winners and nominees at the Cannes Film Festival
- List of Indian submissions for the Academy Award for Best International Feature Film
- List of Indian Grammy Award winners and nominees
