= List of awards and honours received by Narendra Modi =

The Honourable Narendra Modi NIIV CF GCL GCON DAH OE FB GCSK OSG ORTT KmstkNO
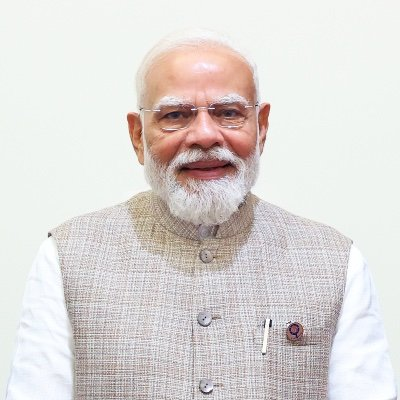
- Born: Narendra Damodardas Modi; 17 September 1950 (age 76); Vadnagar, Bombay State, India
- Education: Delhi University; Gujarat University
- Occupations: Politician; Author
- Years active: 1971–present
- Organization: Rashtriya Swayamsevak Sangh
- Notable work: Mann Ki Baat; Exam Warriors; Abundance in Millets
- Height: 5 ft 7 in (170 cm)
- Title: Prime Minister of India
- Term: 26 May 2014 – present
- Predecessor: Manmohan Singh
- Political party: Bharatiya Janata Party
- Spouse: Jashodaben Modi (m. 1968; sep. 1971)
- Website: narendramodi.in

This is a comprehensive list of awards, honours, and recognitions received by Narendra Modi, the 14th and current Prime Minister of India since 2014. As of 2026, Modi has received more than two dozen civilian honours from various foreign nations, making him the most internationally decorated Indian leader in history.

== State honours ==
Ribbon	Decoration	Country	Date	Location	Presenter	Note	Post-nominal letters	Ref(s)
	Order of King Abdulaziz	Saudi Arabia	3 April 2016	Riyadh	King; Salman	Special Class, the second-highest civilian honour of Saudi Arabia.	–	
	Order of Amanullah Khan	Afghanistan	4 June 2016	Herat	President; Ashraf Ghani	The highest civilian honour of Afghanistan.	–	
	Order of the State of Palestine	Palestine	10 February 2018	Ramallah	President; Mahmoud Abbas	Grand Collar, the highest civilian honour of Palestine.	–	
	Order of Izzuddin	Maldives	8 June 2019	Malé	President; Ibrahim Mohamed Solih	Collar, the highest civilian honour of the Maldives awarded to foreign dignitaries.	NIIV	
	Order of Zayed	United Arab Emirates	24 August 2019 (announced 4 April 2019)	Abu Dhabi	Crown Prince; Mohamed bin Zayed Al Nahyan	Collar, the highest civilian honour of the United Arab Emirates.	–	
	Order of the Renaissance	Bahrain	24 August 2019	Manama	King; Hamad bin Isa Al Khalifa	First Class, the third-highest civilian honour of Bahrain.	–	
	Legion of Merit	United States	21 December 2020	Washington D.C.	President; Donald Trump (Note: Presented by National Security Advisor Robert C. O'Brien on behalf of President Trump.)	Chief Commander, the highest degree of the Legion of Merit. (Note: Accepted by Ambassador Taranjit Singh Sandhu on behalf of Prime Minister Modi.)	–	
	Order of Fiji	Fiji	22 May 2023	Port Moresby	Prime Minister; Sitiveni Rabuka	Honorary Companion, the highest civilian honour of Fiji.	CF	
	Order of Logohu	Papua New Guinea	22 May 2023	Port Moresby	Governor-General; Bob Dadae	Honorary Grand Companion, the highest civilian honour of Papua New Guinea.	GCL	
	Order of the Nile	Egypt	25 June 2023	Cairo	President; Abdel Fattah al-Sisi	Collar, the highest civilian honour of Egypt.	–	
	Legion of Honour	France	14 July 2023	Paris	President; Emmanuel Macron	Grand Cross, the highest civilian honour of France.	–	
	Order of Honour	Greece	25 August 2023	Athens	President; Katerina Sakellaropoulou	Grand Cross, the second-highest civilian honour of Greece.	–	
	Order of the Dragon King	Bhutan	22 March 2024 (announced 17 December 2021)	Thimphu	King; Jigme Khesar Namgyel Wangchuck	First Class, The highest civilian honour of Bhutan. (Note: First foreign recipient of the honour.)	–	
	Order of St. Andrew	Russia	9 July 2024 (announced 12 April 2019)	Moscow	President; Vladimir Putin	Grand Cross with Collar, the highest civilian honour of Russia.	–	
	Order of the Niger	Nigeria	17 November 2024	Abuja	President; Bola Tinubu	Grand Commander, the second-highest civilian honour of Nigeria.	GCON	
	Dominica Award of Honour	Dominica	20 November 2024 (announced 13 November 2024)	Georgetown	President; Sylvanie Burton	The highest civilian honour of Dominica.	DAH	
	Order of Excellence of Guyana	Guyana	20 November 2024	Georgetown	President; Irfaan Ali	Honorary Member, the highest civilian honour of Guyana.	OE	
	Order of Mubarak the Great	Kuwait	22 December 2024	Kuwait City	Emir; Mishal Al-Ahmad Al-Jaber Al-Sabah	Collar, the highest civilian honour of Kuwait.	–	
	Order of Freedom of Barbados	Barbados	5 March 2025 (announced 20 November 2024)	Bridgetown	President; Sandra Mason	Honorary Member, the highest civilian honour of Barbados awarded to foreign dignitaries. (Note: Accepted by Minister of State for External Affairs Pabitra Margherita on behalf of Prime Minister Modi.)	FB	
	Order of the Star and Key of the Indian Ocean	Mauritius	11 March 2025	Port Louis	President; Dharam Gokhool	Grand Commander, the highest civilian honour of Mauritius.	GCSK	
	Sri Lanka Mitra Vibhushana	Sri Lanka	5 April 2025	Colombo	President; Anura Kumara Dissanayake	The highest civilian honour of Sri Lanka awarded to foreign dignitaries.	–	
	Order of Makarios III	Cyprus	16 June 2025	Nicosia	President; Nikos Christodoulides	Grand Cross, the highest civilian honour of Cyprus.	–	
	Order of the Star of Ghana	Ghana	2 July 2025	Accra	President; John Mahama	Honorary Officer, the highest civilian honour of Ghana awarded to foreign dignitaries.	OSG	
	Order of the Republic of Trinidad and Tobago	Trinidad and Tobago	4 July 2025	Port of Spain	President; Christine Kangaloo	The highest civilian honour of Trinidad and Tobago.	ORTT	
	Order of the Southern Cross	Brazil	8 July 2025	Brasília	President; Luiz Inácio Lula da Silva	Grand Collar, the highest civilian honour of Brazil.	–	
	Order of the Welwitschia	Namibia	9 July 2025	Windhoek	President; Netumbo Nandi-Ndaitwah	Grand Commander, the highest civilian honour of Namibia.	–	
	Great Honour Nishan of Ethiopia	Ethiopia	16 December 2025	Addis Ababa	Prime Minister; Abiy Ahmed	The highest civilian honour of Ethiopia. (Note: First recipient of the honour.)	–	
	Order of Oman	Oman	18 December 2025	Muscat	Sultan; Haitham bin Tariq	First Class, the second-highest civilian honour of Oman.	–	
	Medal of the Knesset	Israel	25 February 2026	Tel Aviv	Speaker; Amir Ohana	The highest parliamentary honour of Israel.	–	
	Order of the Polar Star	Sweden	17 May 2026	Gothenburg	Crown Princess; Victoria	Commander Grand Cross, the second-highest civilian honour of Sweden.	KmstkNO	
	Royal Norwegian Order of Merit	Norway	18 May 2026	Oslo	King; Harald V	Grand Cross, the second-highest civilian honour of Norway.	–	
	Order of the White Double Cross	Slovakia	15 June 2026	Bratislava	President; Peter Pellegrini	First Class, the highest civilian honour of Slovakia.	–	
	Star of the Republic of Indonesia	Indonesia	7 July 2026	Jakarta	President; Prabowo Subianto	Adipurna, the highest civilian honour of Indonesia.	–	
	Order of Highest Friendship	Uzbekistan	30 August 2026	Tashkent	President; Shavkat Mirziyoyev	The highest civilian honour of Uzbekistan.	–	

== Scholastic ==
Modi has a policy of not accepting honorary degrees. He had refused to accept honorary doctorate from the Southern University of Louisiana that was offered to him in 2014, and honorary Doctor of Law from the Banaras Hindu University in 2016. Earlier, he had also turned down honorary doctorates offered to him by the Maharaja Sayajirao University of Baroda and several other state universities during his tenure as the Chief Minister of Gujarat.

== Key to the City ==
Year	Honour	City	Country	Presenter	Ref(s)
2018	Key to the City	Kathmandu	Nepal	Mayor; Bidya Sundar Shakya	
2019	Key to the City	Houston	United States	Mayor; Sylvester Turner	
2024	Key to the City	Abuja	Nigeria	Minister; Nyesom Wike	
2024	Key to the City	Georgetown	Guyana	Mayor; Alfred Mentore	
2025	Key to the City	Buenos Aires	Argentina	Chief; Jorge Macri	

== Honorary awards ==
Year	Award	Country/Organisation	Note	Ref(s)
2011	e-Ratna	Computer Society of India		
2018	Champion of the Earth Award	United Nations Environment Programme	The highest environmental award given by the United Nations. Awarded, "for his policy leadership by pioneering work in championing the International Solar Alliance and new areas of levels of cooperation on environmental action."	
2018	Seoul Peace Prize	Seoul Peace Prize Cultural Foundation	Awarded, "for his contribution towards regional and global peace through a proactive foreign policy with countries around the world under the Modi doctrine and the Act East policy."	
2019	Global Goalkeeper Award	Bill & Melinda Gates Foundation	Awarded, "in recognition of the Swachh Bharat Mission and the progress India has made in providing safe sanitation under his leadership."	
2019	Philip Kotler Presidential Award	World Marketing Summit		
2021	Global Energy and Environment Leadership Award	Cambridge Energy Research Associates		
2022	Lata Mangeshkar Award	Master Deenanath Mangeshkar Smriti Pratishthan		
2023	Ebakl Award	Palau	Presented by President Surangel Whipps Jr.	
2023	Lokmanya Tilak National Award	Lokmanya Tilak Smarak Mandir Trust		
2024	Dr. Martin Luther King Jr. Global Peace Award for Minority Upliftment	Association of Indian American Minorities / Washington Adventist University	Jointly awarded.	
2026	Agricola Medal	(United Nations) Food and Agriculture Organization	The highest agricultural award given by the United Nations.	
2026	Guardian of the Blue Horizon Award	Seychelles	Presented by President Patrick Herminie.	

== Competitive awards ==
Association	Year	Category	Work	Result	Ref(s)
Grammy Awards	2024	Best Global Music Performance	Abundance in Millets	Nominated	

== Addresses to foreign legislatures ==
Country	Legislature	Date	Ref.
Bhutan	Parliament of Bhutan	16 June 2014	
Nepal	Federal Parliament of Nepal	3 August 2014	
Australia	Parliament of Australia	18 November 2014	
Fiji	Parliament of Fiji	19 November 2014	
Mauritius	National Assembly of Mauritius	12 March 2015	
Sri Lanka	Parliament of Sri Lanka	13 March 2015	
Mongolia	State Great Khural	17 May 2015	
United Kingdom	Parliament of the United Kingdom	12 November 2015	
Afghanistan	National Assembly of Afghanistan	25 December 2015	
United States	United States Congress	8 June 2016	
United States	United States Congress	22 June 2023	
Uganda	Parliament of Uganda	25 July 2018	
Maldives	People's Majlis	8 June 2019	
Guyana	National Assembly of Guyana	21 November 2024	
Ghana	Parliament of Ghana	3 July 2025	
Trinidad and Tobago	Parliament of Trinidad and Tobago	4 July 2025	
Namibia	Parliament of Namibia	9 July 2025	
Ethiopia	Federal Parliamentary Assembly	17 December 2025	
Israel	Knesset	25 February 2026	
Seychelles	National Assembly of Seychelles	28 June 2026	
Indonesia	People's Consultative Assembly	7 July 2026	

== Recognition ==
Year	Recognition	Organisation	Ref(s)
2005	Best Chief Minister	India Today	
2006	Best Chief Minister	India Today	
2007	Best Chief Minister	India Today	
2008	Best Chief Minister	India Today	
2009	Best Chief Minister	India Today	
2009	Asian Personality of the Year	fDi Intelligence	
2010	Best Chief Minister	India Today	
2011	Best Chief Minister	India Today	
March 2012	Cover of Time Magazine (Asia Edition)	Time	
2012	Best Chief Minister	India Today	
2013	Best Chief Minister	India Today	
June 2014	Cover of Time Magazine (Asia Edition)	Time	
2014	Most Searched Personality	Yahoo India	
2014	Indian of the Year	CNN-IBN	
2014	Asian of the Year	The Straits Times	
2014	Person of the Year	The Times of India	
2014	7th Most Admired Person in the World	YouGov	
2014	15th Most Powerful Person in the World	Forbes	
2014	Top 100 People Positively Influencing Jewish Life	Algemeiner Journal	
2014	100 Leading Global Thinkers	Foreign Policy	
2014	100 Most Influential People in the World	Time	
2014	Person of the Year (Online Readers Poll)	Time	
June 2015	Cover of Time Magazine	Time	
2015	5th Most Admired Man in the World	YouGov	
2015	6th Most Powerful Person in the World	Business Insider	
2015	9th Most Powerful Person in the World	Forbes	
2015	13th Most Influential Person in the World	Bloomberg Markets	
2015	30 Most Influential People on the Internet	Time	
2015	100 Most Influential People in the World	Time	
2016	9th Most Admired Man in the World	YouGov	
2016	9th Most Powerful Person in the World	Forbes	
2016	Person of the Year (Online Readers Poll)	Time	
2016	Wax figure	Madame Tussauds	
2017	Most Searched Personality	Yahoo India	
2017	3rd Top Leader in the World	Gallup International Association	
2017	Top 100 People Positively Influencing Jewish Life	Algemeiner Journal	
2017	100 Most Influential People in the World	Time	
2018	Most Searched Personality	Yahoo India	
2018	8th Most Admired Man in the World	YouGov	
2018	9th Most Powerful Person in the World	Forbes	
2018	Top 100 People Positively Influencing Jewish Life	Algemeiner Journal	
2019	Most Searched Personality	Yahoo India	
2019	6th Most Admired Man in the World	YouGov	
2020	Sabse Tez Neta	Aaj Tak	
2020	4th Most Admired Man in the World	YouGov	
2020	100 Most Influential People in the World	Time	
2021	Sabse Tez Neta	Aaj Tak	
2021	Most Searched Personality	Yahoo India	
2021	5th Greatest Leader in the World	Fortune	
2021	8th Most Admired Man in the World	YouGov	
2021	100 Most Influential People in the World	Time	
2022	Sabse Tez Neta	Aaj Tak	
2022	Top 100 People Positively Influencing Jewish Life	Algemeiner Journal	
2023	Sabse Tez Neta	Aaj Tak	

== Gallery ==
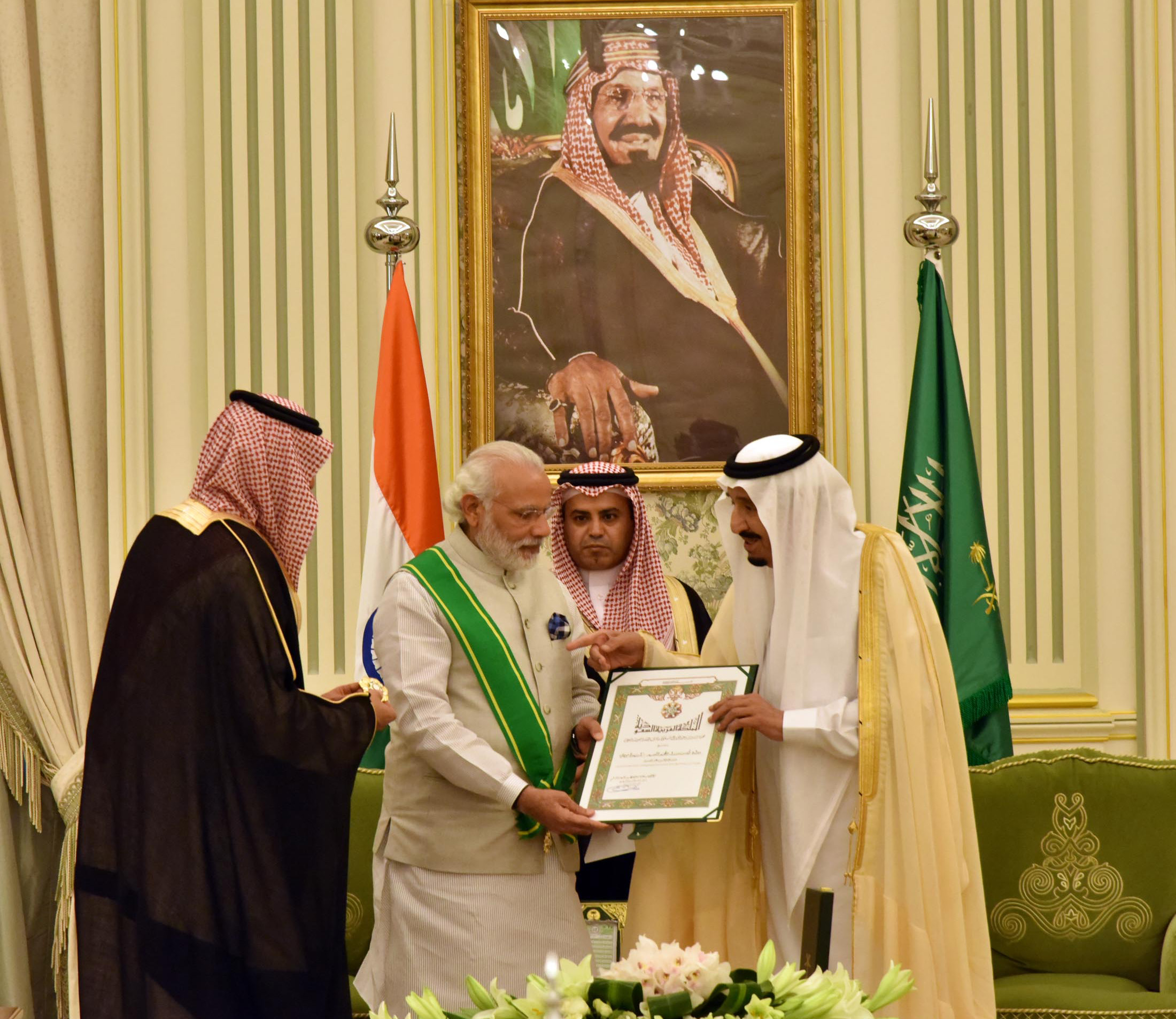
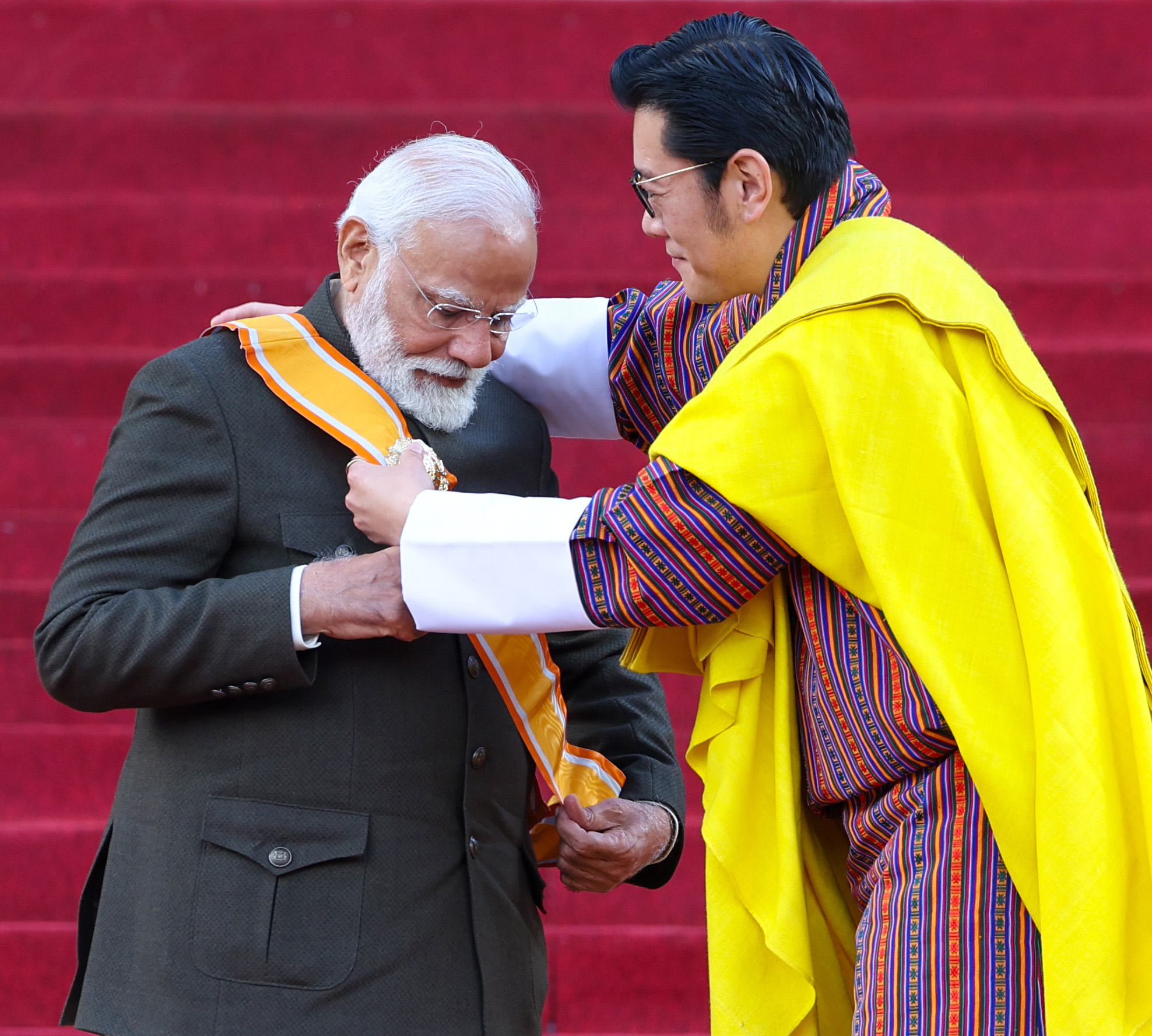
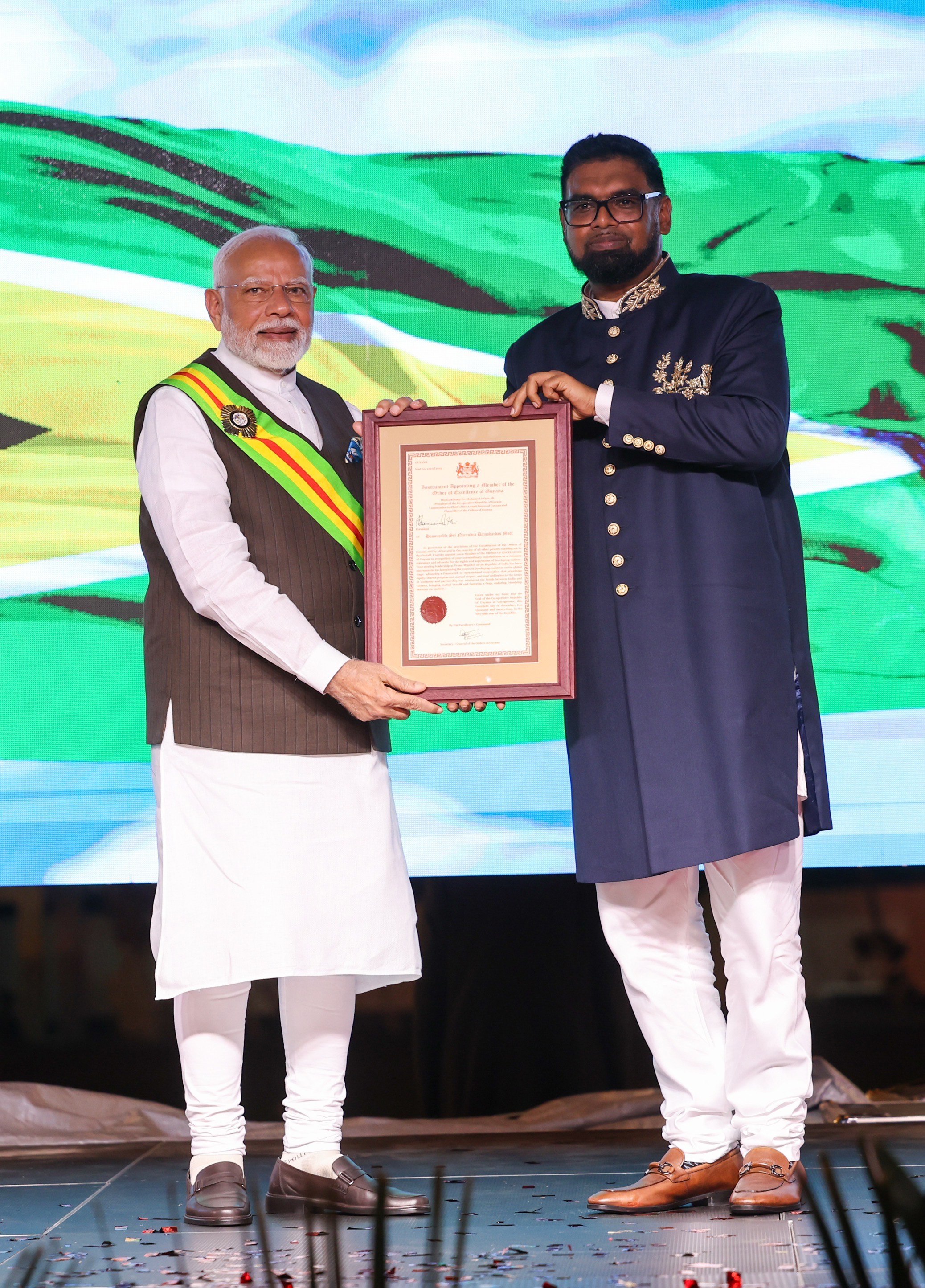
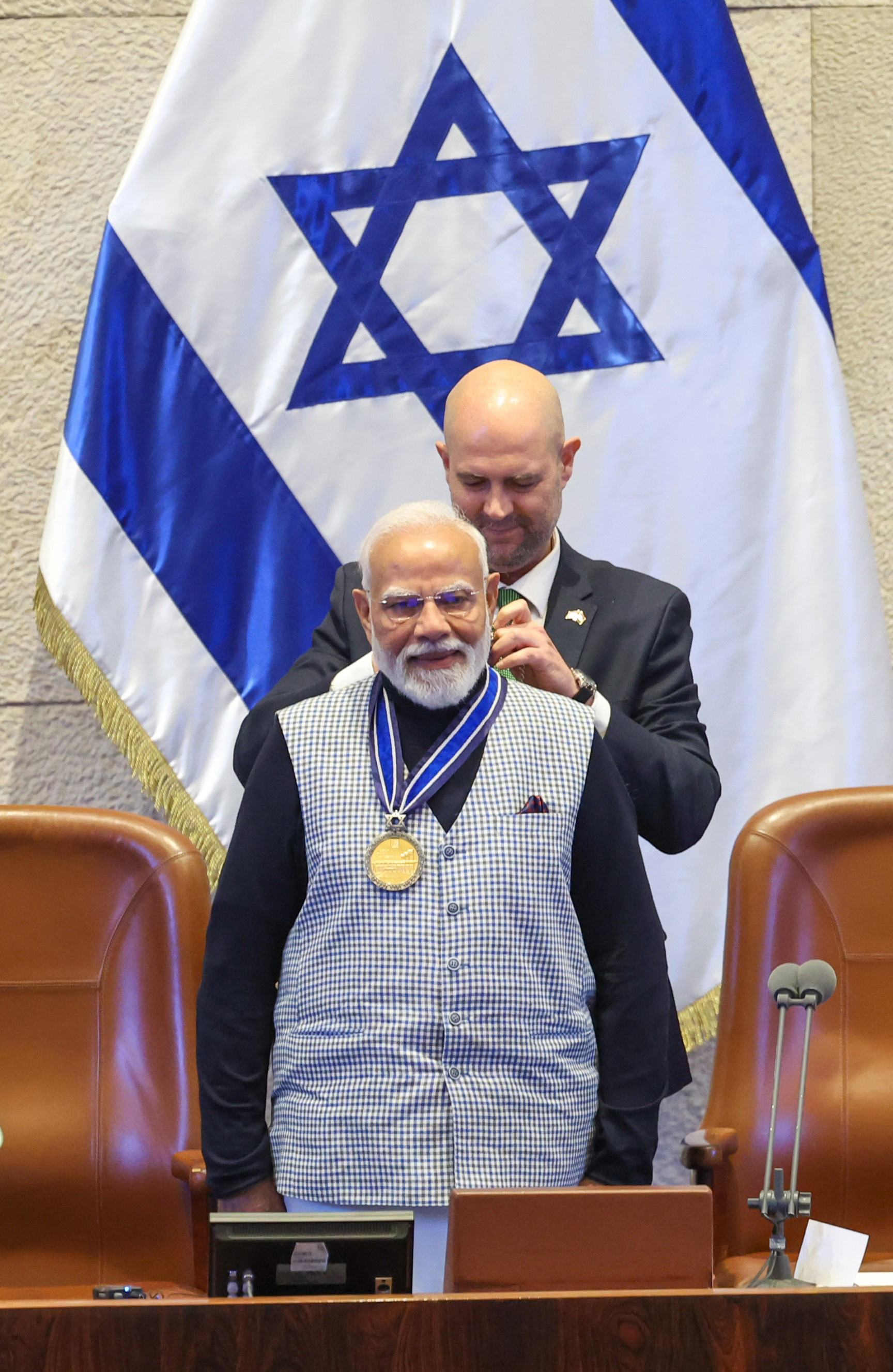
- Top left: Modi being conferred the Order of King Abdulaziz by King of Saudi Arabia Salman.
- Top right: Modi being conferred the Order of the Dragon King by King of Bhutan Jigme Khesar Namgyel Wangchuck.
- Bottom left: Modi being conferred the Order of Excellence of Guyana by President of Guyana Irfaan Ali.
- Bottom right: Modi being conferred the Knesset Medal of the Knesset by Speaker of the Knesset Amir Ohana.

== See also ==
- List of recipients of the Legion of Merit
- List of foreign recipients of the Légion d'Honneur by country
- List of recipients of the Order of the Polar Star
- List of Indian Grammy Award winners and nominees
