= List of Indian Grammy Award winners and nominees =

The following is a list of Grammy Awards winners and nominees from India.

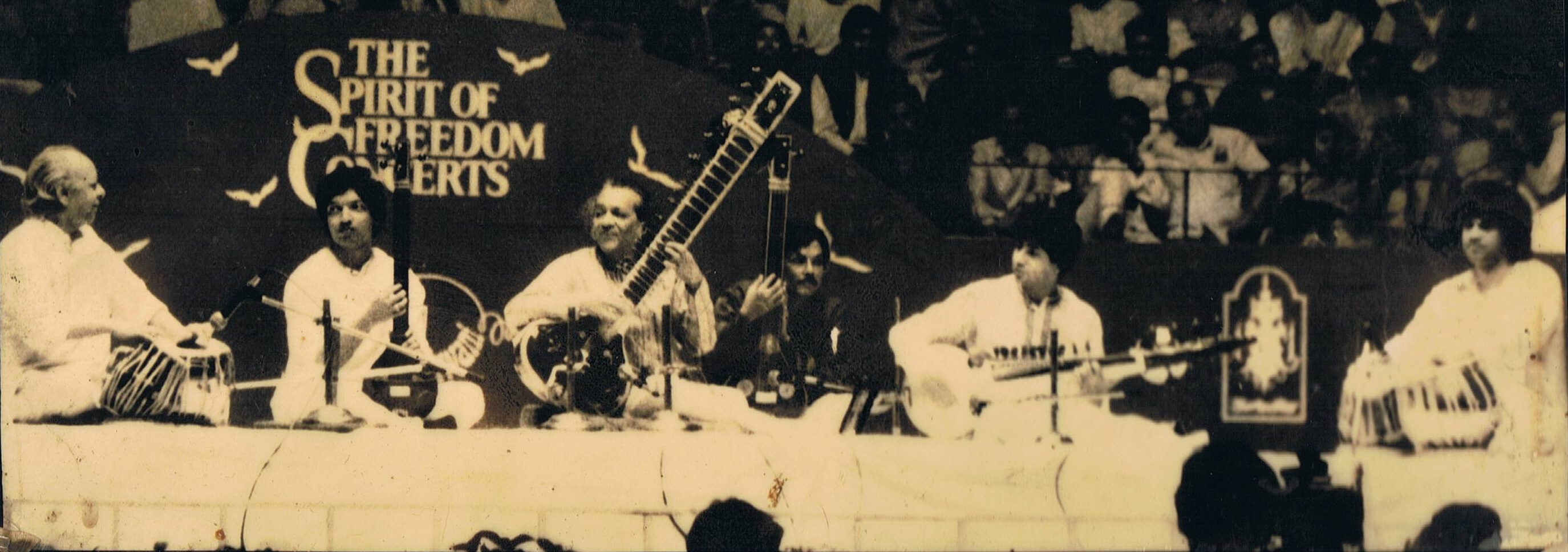
Ravi Shankar (3rd from left) won 5 Grammy awards including Grammy Lifetime Achievement Award, Zakir Hussain (rightmost) has won 4

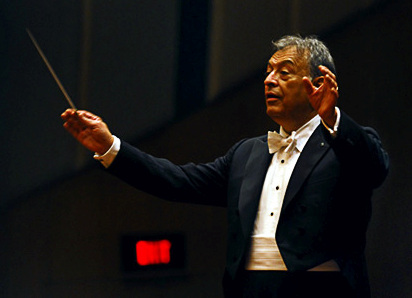
Zubin Mehta has been nominated 18 times, most for any Indian

== Winners ==
Nominee	Wins	Nominations
Ravi Shankar	5	10
Zakir Hussain	4	9
Ricky Kej	3	4
A. R. Rahman	2	2
P. A. Deepak	2	2
Rakesh Chaurasia	2	2
Ganesh Rajagopalan	1	3
Shankar Mahadevan	1	3
V. Selvaganesh	1	3
Vishwa Mohan Bhatt	1	2
Gulzar	1	1
H. Sridhar	1	1
Tanvi Shah	1	1

== Nominees without ever winning ==
Nominee	Wins	Nominations
Zubin Mehta	0	18
Ali Akbar Khan	0	5
Asha Bhosle	0	2
Narendra Modi	0	1
Siddhant Bhatia	0	1
T. H. Vinayakram	0	1
Varijashree Venugopal	0	1

== List ==
Year	Category	Nominees(s)	Nominated work	Result
1967 (9th)	Best Folk Recording	Ravi Shankar	Sound of the Sitar	Nominated
1968 (10th)	Best Chamber Music Performance	Ravi Shankar	West Meets East	Won
1970 (12th)	Album of the Year, Classical	Zubin Mehta	Strauss: Also Sprach Zarathustra	Nominated
1970 (12th)	Best Classical Performance, Orchestra	Zubin Mehta	Strauss: Also Sprach Zarathustra	Nominated
1970 (12th)	Best Opera Recording	Zubin Mehta	Verdi: Il Trovatore	Nominated
1972 (14th)	Best Choral Performance, Classical	Zubin Mehta	Verdi: Four Sacred Pieces	Nominated
1973 (15th)	Album of the Year	Ravi Shankar	The Concert for Bangladesh	Won
1974 (16th)	Best Opera Recording	Zubin Mehta	Puccini: Turandot	Nominated
1977 (19th)	Best Classical Orchestral Performance	Zubin Mehta	The Fourth of July (Ives: Symphony No. 2, Variations on America/ Copland: Appalachian Spring/ Bernstein: Overture to Candide/ Gershwin: American in Paris)	Nominated
1979 (21st)	Best Pop Instrumental Performance	Zubin Mehta	Star Wars and Close Encounters of the Third Kind	Nominated
1979 (21st)	Best Classical Orchestral Performance	Zubin Mehta	Stravinsky: Rite of Spring	Nominated
1979 (21st)	Best Opera Recording	Zubin Mehta	Puccini: La Fanciulla Del West	Nominated
1980 (22nd)	Best Pop Instrumental Performance	Zubin Mehta	Manhattan - Music From The Woody Allen Film	Nominated
1981 (23rd)	Best Classical Album	Zubin Mehta	Bartók: Concerto for Violin and Orchestra	Nominated
1982 (24th)	Best Classical Album	Zubin Mehta	Isaac Stern 60th Anniversary Celebration	Nominated
1982 (24th)	Best Choral Performance (Other Than Opera)	Zubin Mehta	Verdi: Requiem	Nominated
1984 (26th)	Best Classical Album	Zubin Mehta	Vivaldi: Four Seasons and Concerto for 4 Violins, Op. 3, No. 10/ Bach: Double Concerto BWV 1043/ Mozart: Sinfonia Concertante, K. 364	Nominated
1984 (26th)	Best Ethnic or Traditional Folk Recording	Ravi Shankar	Raga Mishra Piloo	Nominated
1991 (33rd)	Best Classical Album	Zubin Mehta	Carreras, Domingo, Pavarotti in Concert	Nominated
1994 (36th)	Best World Music Album	Vishwa Mohan Bhatt	A Meeting by the River	Won
1995 (37th)	Album of the Year	Zubin Mehta	The 3 Tenors in Concert 1994	Nominated
1995 (37th)	Best Pop Album	Zubin Mehta	The 3 Tenors in Concert 1994	Nominated
1996 (38th)	Best World Music Album	T. H. Vinayakram, and Zakir Hussain	Raga Aberi	Nominated
1997 (39th)	Best World Music Album	Vishwa Mohan Bhatt	Tabula Rasa	Nominated
1997 (39th)	Best World Music Album	Asha Bhosle	Legacy	Nominated
2002 (44th)	Best World Music Album	Ravi Shankar	Full Circle: Carnegie Hall 2000	Won
2006 (48th)	Best Contemporary World Music Album	Asha Bhosle	You've Stolen My Heart	Nominated
2007 (49th)	Best Traditional World Music Album	Zakir Hussain	Golden Strings of the Sarode	Nominated
2008 (50th)	Best Opera Recording	Zubin Mehta	Verdi: La Traviata	Nominated
2009 (51st)	Best Contemporary World Music Album	Zakir Hussain	Global Drum Project	Won
2010 (52nd)	Best Classical Crossover Album	Zakir Hussain	The Melody of Rhythm	Nominated
2010 (52nd)	Best Compilation Soundtrack Album for Motion Pictures, Television or Other Visual Media	A. R. Rahman, P. A. Deepak, and H. Sridhar	Slumdog Millionaire	Won
2010 (52nd)	Best Song Written for Motion Picture, Television or Other Visual Media	Gulzar, A. R. Rahman, and Tanvi Shah	Jai Ho (from Slumdog Millionaire)	Won
2013 (55th)	Lifetime Achievement Award	Ravi Shankar	Honorary	Won
2013 (55th)	Best World Music Album	Ravi Shankar	The Living Room Sessions Pt. 1	Won
2014 (56th)	Best World Music Album	Ravi Shankar	The Living Room Sessions Pt. 2	Nominated
2015 (57th)	Best New Age Album	Ricky Kej	Winds of Samsara	Won
2022 (64th)	Best New Age Album	Ricky Kej and P. A. Deepak	Divine Tides	Won
2023 (65th)	Best Immersive Audio Album	Ricky Kej	Divine Tides	Won
2024 (66th)	Best Global Music Performance	Narendra Modi	Abundance in Millets	Nominated
2024 (66th)	Best Global Music Performance	Zakir Hussain and Rakesh Chaurasia	Pashto	Won
2024 (66th)	Best Contemporary Instrumental Album	Zakir Hussain and Rakesh Chaurasia	As We Speak	Won
2024 (66th)	Best Global Music Album	Shakti(Ganesh Rajagopalalan, Shankar Mahadevan, V. Selvaganesh, Zakir Hussain)	This Moment	Won
2025 (67th)	Best New Age Album, Ambient or Chant	Ricky Kej	Break of Dawn	Nominated
2025 (67th)	Best Global Music Performance	Varijashree Venugopal	A Rock Somewhere	Nominated
2026 (68th)	Best Global Music Album	Siddhant Bhatia	Sounds of Kumbha	Nominated
2026 (68th)	Best Global Music Album	Shakti (Ganesh Rajagopalalan, Shankar Mahadevan, V. Selvaganesh, Zakir Hussain)	Mind Explosion (50th Anniversary Tour Live)	Nominated
2026 (68th)	Best Global Music Performance	Shakti (Ganesh Rajagopalalan, Shankar Mahadevan, V. Selvaganesh, Zakir Hussain)	Shrini's Dream (Live)	Nominated

== See also ==
- List of Indian Academy Award winners and nominees
- List of Indian Golden Globe Award winners and nominees
- List of Indian winners and nominees of the British Academy Film Awards
- List of Indian winners and nominees at the Cannes Film Festival
- List of Indian submissions for the Academy Award for Best International Feature Film
