= Patang (1993 film) =

1993 Indian Hindi-language drama film

- Poster
- Directed by: Goutam Ghose
- Screenplay by: Goutam Ghose; Ain Rasheed Khan, Sanjay Sahay
- Story by: Sanjay Sahay
- Produced by: Sanjay Sahay; Durba Sahay
- Starring: Shabana Azmi; Shafiq Syed; Om Puri; Rabi Ghosh
- Cinematography: Goutam Ghose
- Edited by: Moloy Banerjee
- Music by: Goutam Ghose
- Production company: G.N.S. Motion Pictures
- Release date: 1993
- Running time: 104 minutes
- Country: India
- Language: Hindi

Patang ('Kite') is a 1993 Indian Hindi-language drama film directed by Goutam Ghose, starring Shabana Azmi, Shafiq Syed, Om Puri and Rabi Ghosh. It is set in small railway station near Gaya and shows the lives of people in illegal slums near it. The film was shot in Gaya and Manpur in Bihar.

At the 41st National Film Awards (for 1993), Patang won the award for Best Feature Film in Hindi. At the Taormina Film Fest, Shabana Azmi won the Best Actress Award. The cast included child actor Shafiq Syed in only his second film. He had earlier played the lead role of Krishna (Chaipau) in Mira Nair's Academy Award-nominated film Salaam Bombay! (1988).

== Plot ==
Son of Jitni, Somra resides in Manpur, a tiny Bihar railway station close to Gaya. Somra has a kite obsession. Jitni and Mathura, a small-time criminal, have a covert but acknowledged relationship. Rabbani, an idealistic railway officer, tries in vain to alter a system that is closely associated with politicians, criminals, and bureaucracy. With kites flapping in the background, shady transactions take place in the relentless heat.

== Cast ==
- Shabana Azmi as Jitni
- Shafiq Syed as Somra
- Om Puri as Mathura
- Rabi Ghosh
- Abul Khair
- Mohan Agashe
- Kamlesh Kunti Singh
- Ashad Sinha
- Shatrughan Sinha as Rabbani
- Durba Sahay as Collector's Wife
- Raisul Islam Asad
