= List of Indian Academy Award winners and nominees =

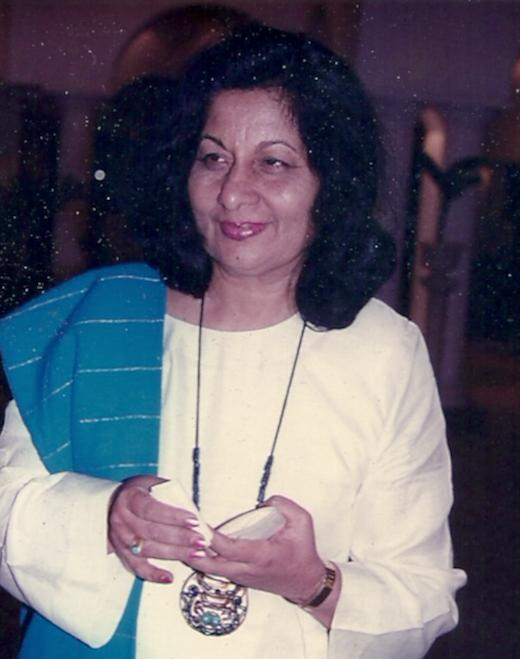
Bhanu Athaiya became the first Indian to win an Academy Award for designing the costumes for Richard Attenborough's Gandhi (1982).

Indian individuals and films have received or been nominated in different categories of the Academy Awards (also known as Oscar). As of 2023, 18 Indians have been nominated and 10 have won Oscars including in the scientific and technical and honorary category.

At the 30th Academy Awards, Mehboob Khan's 1957 Hindi-language film Mother India was India's first submission for the Academy Award for Best International Feature Film category. It was nominated alongside four other films and lost to the Italian film Nights of Cabiria (1957) by one vote. In 1982, The National Film Development Corporation of India was instrumental in co-producing Richard Attenborough's biographical film Gandhi. At the 55th Academy Awards, Bhanu Athaiya became the first Indian to win an Academy Award for designing the costumes. Ravi Shankar was nominated for Best Original Score for the same film. As of 2023, three Indian films have been nominated for Best International Feature Film — Mother India, Salaam Bombay! (1988) and Lagaan (2001).

In 1992, legendary Bengali filmmaker Satyajit Ray was bestowed with an Academy Honorary Award. He became the only Indian to date to receive the honour. In 2000, M. Night Shyamalan became the first Indian-American to receive an Oscar nomination for his 1999 film The Sixth Sense. He was nominated for Best Director and Best Original Screenplay respectively. Currently, Shyamalan is the only person of Indian heritage to be nominated in those categories.

A. R. Rahman and Resul Pookutty won the Academy Award for Best Sound Mixing and Best Original Score, respectively, for the 2008 British film Slumdog Millionaire. Rahman also won for Best Original Song alongside lyricist Gulzar for the song "Jai Ho", becoming the first and only Indian to date to have won more than one Academy Award. Rahman also holds the record for most nominations for an Indian with five total nominations to date, followed by Ismail Merchant with four nominations (three for Best Picture and once for Live Action Short).

At the 95th Academy Awards, three different Indian productions received Oscar nominations, with both RRR (feature film) and The Elephant Whisperers (documentary short film) winning among their respective categories and thus the former became 'The first Indian Full-length Feature film' and the latter became 'The first Indian Documentary short film' to win the Oscars. Vikas Sathaye is the only Indian to have received the Oscars in the technical category.

== Winners and nominees ==
In the following tables, the years correspond to the year in which the films were released; the Academy Award ceremony is held the following year.

=== Honorary awards ===
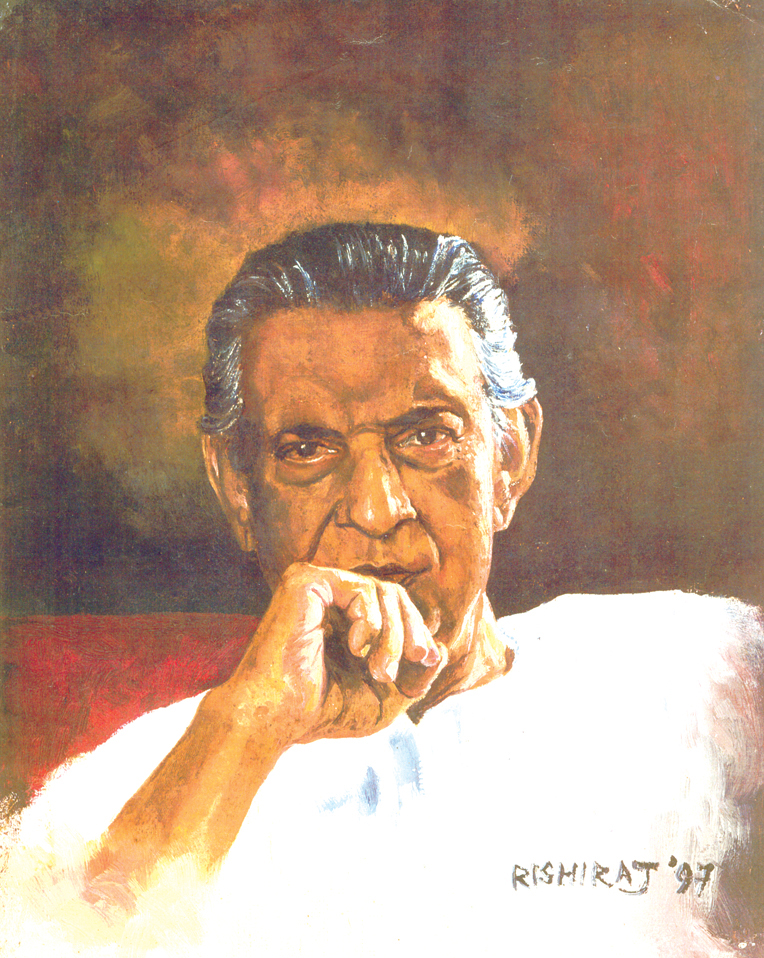
India's only Oscar Academy Honorary Award recipient (in 1992) director Satyajit Ray (Born in Kolkata, Bengal, now West Bengal, into a Bengali Hindu family of Mymensingh, Bengal, now Bangladesh). He received this award for his lifetime achievement in Bengali cinema.

Honorary awards
| Year | Recipient | Note | Ref. |
|---|---|---|---|
| 1992 (64th) | Satyajit Ray | "In recognition of his rare mastery of the art of motion pictures, and of his profound humanitarian outlook, which has had an indelible influence on filmmakers and audiences throughout the world." | |

=== Competitive Awards ===
Competitive awards
| Year | Nominee(s)/recipient(s) | Film | Category | Result | Ref. |
|---|---|---|---|---|---|
| 1958 (30th) | Mother India | Mother India | Best Foreign Language Film | Nominated | |
| 1961 (33rd) | Ismail Merchant | The Creation of Woman | Best Short Subject (Live Action) | Nominated | |
| 1969 (41st) | Fali Bilimoria | The House That Ananda Built | Best Documentary (Short Subject) | Nominated | |
| 1978 (50th) | Ishu Patel | Bead Game | Best Animated Short Film | Nominated | |
| 1979 (51st) | K. K. Kapil | An Encounter with Faces | Best Documentary (Short Subject) | Nominated | |
| 1983 (55th) | Bhanu Athaiya | Gandhi | Best Costume Design | Won | |
| 1983 (55th) | Ravi Shankar | Gandhi | Best Original Score | Nominated | |
| 1987 (59th) | Ismail Merchant | A Room with a View | Best Picture | Nominated | |
| 1989 (61st) | Salaam Bombay! | Salaam Bombay! | Best Foreign Language Film | Nominated | |
| 1993 (65th) | Ismail Merchant | Howards End | Best Picture | Nominated | |
| 1994 (66th) | Ismail Merchant | The Remains of the Day | Best Picture | Nominated | |
| 2002 (74th) | Lagaan | Lagaan | Best Foreign Language Film | Nominated | |
| 2005 (77th) | Ashvin Kumar | Little Terrorist | Best Short Subject (Live Action) | Nominated | |
| 2009 (81st) | Resul Pookutty | Slumdog Millionaire | Best Sound Mixing | Won | |
| 2009 (81st) | Gulzar (Lyrics) | Slumdog Millionaire | Best Original Song (For "Jai Ho") | Won | |
| 2009 (81st) | A. R. Rahman (Music) | Slumdog Millionaire | Best Original Song (For "Jai Ho") | Won | |
| 2009 (81st) | A. R. Rahman (Music) | Slumdog Millionaire | Best Original Score | Won | |
| 2009 (81st) | A. R. Rahman (Music) | Slumdog Millionaire | Best Original Song (For "O... Saya") | Nominated | |
| 2011 (83rd) | A. R. Rahman (Music) | 127 Hours | Best Original Score | Nominated | |
| 2011 (83rd) | A. R. Rahman (Music) | 127 Hours | Best Original Song (For "If I Rise") | Nominated | |
| 2013 (85th) | Bombay Jayashri (Lyrics) | Life of Pi | Best Original Song (For "Pi's Lullaby") | Nominated | |
| 2022 (94th) | Rintu Thomas | Writing with Fire | Best Documentary Feature | Nominated | |
| 2023 (95th) | M. M. Keeravani (Music) Chandrabose (Lyrics) | RRR | Best Original Song (For "Naatu Naatu") | Won | |
| 2023 (95th) | Kartiki Gonsalves Guneet Monga | The Elephant Whisperers | Best Documentary (Short Subject) | Won | |
| 2023 (95th) | Shaunak Sen Aman Mann | All That Breathes | Best Documentary Feature | Nominated | |

=== Scientific and technical awards ===
Scientific and technical awards
| Year | Nominee(s)/recipient(s) | Category | Note | Ref. |
|---|---|---|---|---|
| 2018 (90th) | Vikas Sathaye (Note: For "the concept, design, engineering and implementation" of the Shotover K1 Camera System.) | Academy Scientific and Technical Award | Shared the award with John Coyle, Brad Hurndell and Shane Buckham for work on the Shotover K1 camera platform. | |

== See also ==
- List of Indian submissions for the Academy Award for Best International Feature Film
- List of Indian Golden Globe Award winners and nominees
- List of Indian winners and nominees of the British Academy Film Awards
- List of Indian winners and nominees at the Cannes Film Festival
- List of Indian Grammy Award winners and nominees
