= BAFTA Award for Best Children's & Family Film =

British film industry award

- Awarded for: Excellence in family films
- Country: United Kingdom
- Presented by: British Academy of Film and Television Arts
- First award: 2024
- Currently held by: Boong (2025)
- Website: http://www.bafta.org/

The BAFTA Award for Best Children's & Family Film is a film award given by the British Academy of Film and Television Arts (BAFTA) at the annual British Academy Film Awards. BAFTA is a British organisation that hosts annual awards shows for film, television, and video games (and formerly also for children's film and television).

Introduced in 2025 after BAFTA changed multiple polices in their award categories, the category was made to showcase films that had inter-generational interest to children, young people and adults. For a film to be considered eligible for the category, it must be rated either a U, PG or 12a by the British Board of Film Classification (BBFC).

In the following lists, the titles and names in bold with a gold background are the winners and recipients respectively; those not in bold are the nominees. The years given are those in which the films under consideration were released, not the year of the ceremony, which always takes place the following year.

== Winners and nominees ==
=== 2020s ===
Year	Film	Director(s)	Producer(s)	Country
**2024** (78th)	**Wallace & Gromit: Vengeance Most Fowl**	**Nick Park and Merlin Crossingham**	**Richard Beek**	**United Kingdom**
**2024** (78th)	Flow	Gints Zilbalodis	Matīss Kaža	Latvia
**2024** (78th)	Kensuke's Kingdom	Neil Boyle and Kirk Hendry	Camilla Deakin, Ruth Fielding, and Stephen Roellants	United Kingdom; Luxembourg; France
**2024** (78th)	The Wild Robot	Chris Sanders	Jeff Hermann	United States
**2025** (79th)	**Boong**	**Lakshmipriya Devi**	**Ritesh Sidhwani**	**India**
**2025** (79th)	Arco	Ugo Bienvenu	Ugo Bienvenu, Félix De Givry, Sophie Mas, and Natalie Portman	France; United States
**2025** (79th)	Lilo & Stitch	Dean Fleischer Camp	Jonathan Eirich	United States
**2025** (79th)	Zootropolis 2	Jared Bush and Byron Howard	Yvett Merino	United States
