= Falu =

American singer

- Born: Falguni Shah; Bombay, India
- Citizenship: United States
- Occupations: Singer; Songwriter
- Musical career
- Origin: New York City, United States
- Genres: Classical; Western
- Instrument: Vocals
- Years active: 2004–present
- Website: falumusic.com

Falu (born Falguni Shah; in Bombay, India) is an American singer whose music blends ancient classical Indian melodies with contemporary western sounds. She has worked and collaborated with a wide array of artists including A. R. Rahman (Slumdog Millionaire), Yo-Yo Ma (in The Silk Road Project), Philip Glass, Wyclef Jean, her teacher Ustad Sultan Khan, Blues Traveler, Ricky Martin and Bernie Worrell (Parliament Funkadelic). In 2022, she won the Grammy Award for Best Children's Album for her album A Colorful World. She was also nominated for Best Children's Album for her 2019 release of Falu's Bazaar, and for Best Global Music Performance for her 2023 release of Abundance in Millets.

== Biography ==
In her early years in Mumbai, Falu was trained in the Jaipur gharana musical tradition, honing her talent for up to 16 hours a day. She continued studying under the sarangi/vocal master Ustad Sultan Khan, and later with Kishori Amonkar in Jaipur style.

Falu moved to the States in 2000, and joined the Boston-based Indo-American band Karyshma as a lead vocalist. In 2001, she met up with Asian Massive leader Karsh Kale, and hit the nationwide university, club and festival circuits. After fulfilling a 2-year Indian music visiting lectureship at Tufts University in Boston, Falu moved to New York where she formed her own band of the same name. They began performing at music venues throughout New York, quickly garnering the attention of fans across the city.

== Career ==
In 2004, Falu was invited to perform as a soloist with Yo-Yo Ma's Silk Road Project. In 2005 she was asked to serve as one of Carnegie Hall's Musical Ambassadors to New York City. In May 2006, she delivered her debut solo performance at Carnegie Hall (Zankel). Later in the year she joined the Born Into Brothels Ensemble (from the 2004 Academy-Award winning film) and in early 2007 she collaborated with Wyclef Jean, lending her vocal style to the score of Angelina Jolie's directorial debut A Place in Time. In January 2008, Falu and her band were featured on FOX channel's Fearless Music, where her original song Rabba became the first Hindi song ever to be aired on the network.

In August 2007, Falu released her self-titled debut CD. Soon afterward, her "Indie Hindi" musical style made its mark in The Wall Street Journal as representative of a new class of musical hybrids.

In May 2009, Falu made a special appearance at the Time 100 Gala—Time magazine's yearly gala celebrating their list of the 100 most influential people in the world—performing a rendition of "Jai Ho" alongside Slumdog Millionaire film composer A. R. Rahman, for an exclusive and star-studded crowd which included First Lady Michelle Obama, Oprah Winfrey, Barbara Walters, Stella McCartney, Liv Tyler, M.I.A. and more.

In November 2009, Falu was invited to the White House to again sing alongside A. R. Rahman at President Obama's first State Dinner in honor of the Indian Prime Minister Manmohan Singh.

2011 was a year of film music for Falu, from writing music for the documentary "The Human Tower" (along with composers Andres Subercaseaux and Rene Veron) to writing for the film "First Sight" (with Sivamani and Mark Tewarson). In the same year, Falu also contributed to Global Noize's sophomore album Prayer For the Planet. She also continued to work closely with Carnegie Hall's Weill Music Institute, pushing the boundaries of global music collaboration including with kids from New York's Crossroads Juvenile Center and with inmates from Sing Sing Correctional Facility in upstate NY where she, her band and 16 musically talented inmates performed for more than 400 other inmates in early 2012.

In 2013 Falu released her second album entitled "Foras Road", a collection of original and traditional songs inspired by the semi-classical music performed and guarded for centuries by courtesans dwelling on the road of the same name in Bombay. The album was produced by Grammy-winning producer Danny Blume and was featured on NPR's SoundCheck in May 2013. "Foras Road" was then re-released in November 2018.

Falu's band of the same name includes musicians who draw from Indian classical, alternative rock, contemporary pop, and electronic styles to create a mix of East and West—one reason why The New York Times featured Falu in a story titled "Bridging Cultural Gaps with Music." The band members are Gaurav Shah (vocals / harmonium), Mark Tewarson (guitars), Danny Blume (bass), Deep Singh (tabla/percussions), Dave Sharma (percussions) and Soumya Chatterjee (violin).

In 2015, Falu was named one of the 20 most influential global Indian women by the Economic Times of India. In 2018, she won the Women Icons of India award in Mumbai, India. Falu was an integral part of Givenchy's September 11 fashion show (Ricardo Tisci collection under the art direction of Marina Abramović) in NYC, where she performed for a star-studded audience. Falu continues to pursue her commitment to introducing children to the wonders of the world through her Grammy nominated debut kids project, "Falu's Bazaar", which takes families on a musical journey through South Asia, as well as through her artist-in-residence position at Carnegie Hall.

In 2018, she came out with a twelve-song album in Hindi, English, and Gujarati called Falu's Bazaar. It features her husband, singer-songwriter Gaurav Shah, and her mother, classical singer Kishori Dalal. Dalal has also sung a piece called Nishaad's Lullaby, a song in Gujarati without any percussion. The album was nominated for a Grammy in the Best Children's Music category in 2019.

Falu released a her second children's album, A Colorful World, produced by Grammy Award Winning producers Kenya Autie, Mario Sanmarti, and Tina Kids. A Colorful World, mixed and mastered by Grammy Award Winning Engineer, won a Grammu in the 64th Grammy Awards for Best Children's Music Album in 2021

In 2020, Falu teamed up with bassist Yasushi Nakamura, drummer Clarence Penn and guitarist, and vocalist Clay Ross to form the American Patchwork Quartet. Leveraging immigrant histories and backgrounds, the Quartet interprets timeless songs in a modern 21st century perspective. The group continues to tour performing arts centers around the world.

On Oct 25, 2022 Falu was awarded a Citation by the Mayor of NYC, Eric Adams, during Diwali for successfully representing immigrants in NYC. Later on Nov 1, 2022 she received a Proclamation by the NYC Council “for fostering greater harmony around the world”

Falu and Gaurav Shah collaborated with the Indian Prime Minister Narendra Modi on a single named "Abundance in Millets" that was released on June 16, 2023 - a song that was inspired by the UN initiative declaring 2023 as the "International Year of Millets". This song was nominated for a Grammy in the Best Global Music Performance category.

== Discography (including vocal contributions) ==
- Abundance in Millets by Falu, Gaurav Shah, and Narendra Modi (Single, Monsoon Records, 2023)
- A Colorful World by Falu (El Cerrito Records, 2021)
- Falu's Bazaar by Falu (Monsoon Records, 2018)
- Foras Road by Falu (Monsoon Records, 2013 and re-released in 2018)
- A Prayer for the Planet by Global Noize (2011)
- Global Noize (Shanachie, 2008) with Jason Miles, DJ Logic and others
- Falu (self-titled debut, Monsoon Records, 2007)
- Asana OHM Shanti (Meta, 2006) by Bill Laswell
- Rare Elements (Five Points Records, 2004) with Ustad Sultan Khan, Thievery Corporation, Joe Clausell, Ralphi Rosari
- Nearly Home by Karyshma (2003)
- Melodies of Circumstance (Dharma Moon, 2003)
- Liberation by Karsh Kale (Six Degrees, 2003)
- Om Yoga Mix (Dharma Moon, 2003)
- At Ease (Dharma Moon, 2003)
- Realize by Karsh Kale (Six Degrees, 2001)
