= Shafiq Syed =

Indian auto rickshaw driver and former child actor

Shafiq Syed (born 1976) is an Indian auto rickshaw driver and former child actor. At the age of twelve, he played the lead role in Mira Nair's Academy Award-nominated film Salaam Bombay! (1988), for which he received the 1989 National Film Award for Best Child Artist at the 36th National Film Awards. As an adult, he drives an auto rickshaw in Bengaluru and also works as an assistant in television production units.

== Career ==
Syed grew up in Bangalore slums, before running away to Bombay (now Mumbai) with some friends, "just to see if what we saw in Hindi movies (Bollywood) was true". In the following years, he lived as one of the street children living on the pavements near Churchgate railway station.

After doing one more film, Patang (1994) directed by Goutam Ghose, he returned to Bangalore in 1993. In 2009, after the success of Slumdog Millionaire, also known for its child actors, he was spotted as an autorickshaw driver in Bangalore and interviewed by The Times of India. Thereafter, in May 2012, he was working as an assistant in production companies making Kannada television soaps. It was reported that Syed had written his life's story, running into 180 pages. "I have ... titled it After Salaam Bombay" he said. "Hope someone will take it up for production".

He is married and lives in a Bangalore suburb, 30 km from the main city, with his wife, mother and three sons and a daughter.

== Filmography ==
Year	Film	Role	Notes
1988	Salaam Bombay!	Krishna alias Chaipau	
1993	Patang	Somra	
2015	Care of Footpath 2	Coconut Vendor	Kannada-Hindi bilingual film
