= Chanda Sharma =

Indian actress

- Occupation: Actress

Chanda Sharma is an Indian actress, known for Salaam Bombay! (1988), London's Burning (1988) and Family Pride (1991). She also appears in numerous television series.

== Filmography ==
=== Film ===
Year	Film	Role	Notes
1988	Salaam Bombay!	Sola	debut film

=== Television ===
Year	TV series	Role	Notes
1986-1989	The Bill (1986-2010)	Mrs. Shah in the episode "All Part of the Job" (1989) (credited as Chand Sherma); Indian Lady in the episode "Public and Confidential" (1986) (credited as Chand Sherma)	debut series
1990	Grange Hill	Mrs. Rashim	"Kiss & Tell" (1990) "Richard of York Gains Battles In Vain" (1990) "Lovely Shopping" (1990) "Model#2" (1990) "Get A Room" (1990) "Nails" (1990) "Creep" (1990)
1991	Family Pride	Mrs. Lai	in Episode #1.1 (1991)
1994	Casualty	Mrs. Singh (as Chand Sherma)	"Under the Weather" (1994)
1995	London's Burning	Mrs. Jaidah (as Chand Sherma)	Episode #8.5 (1995)
2000	Animated Tales of the World	Tree (voice, as Chand Sherma)	"Podna and Podni: A Story from Pakistan" (2000)
