= Danny Blume =

American composer

Danny Blume is an American music producer, musician, and composer. He is a Grammy Award winner and multiple Grammy nominee. He operates a studio and lives in Woodstock, New York. Before becoming a music producer, he played as a guitarist and bassist for Kid Creole and the Coconuts, playing for multiple U.S Presidents. In the 2018 Grammy's, he was nominated for Best Children's Album for his work as a producer with Falu as engineer and producer.
