= Dhuin =

2022 Indian Maithili-language film

- Directed by: Achal Mishra
- Written by: Anand Bansal, Abhinav Jha, Achal Mishra, Anubhav Priya, Prashant Rana, Parth Saurabh
- Produced by: Achal Mishra
- Starring: Abhinav Jha, Bijay Kumar Sah, Prashant Rana, Ankush Prasad, Satyendra Jha
- Cinematography: Anand Bansal
- Edited by: Achal Mishra
- Music by: Tajdar Junaid
- Production company: Achalchitra
- Release date: 22 February 2022 (India)
- Running time: 50 minutes
- Country: India
- Language: Maithili

Dhuin (धुइन, transl. Mist) is a Maithili language film directed and co-written by Achal Mishra in 2022 and produced by Achalchitra production house. The film is about a guy named Pankaj who comes from a small town and wants to succeed in Mumbai as a theatre practitioner.

== Plot ==
Pankaj is a theatre performer from a small town who wants to succeed in Mumbai. He must measure his goals against his responsibilities towards his family, which is suffering financially as a result of the lockdown and make a decision.

== Cast ==
- Abhinav Jha as Pankaj
- Bijay Kumar Sah
- Prashant Rana
- Ankush Prasad
- Satyendra Jha
- Asha Ram
- Prakash Bandhu

== Synopsis ==
Dhuin narrates the tale of Pankaj, a small-town theatre performer with aspirations of becoming well known in Mumbai. The novel was inspired by an image of a father and son riding a bike through a foggy winter morning. But Pankaj is forced to choose between following his aspirations and doing what is right for his family, who are suffering financially as a result of the lockdown.

== Production ==
The scenario in which one of the Gamak Ghar performers had to accompany his retired father to a job interview served as the inspiration for Dhuin. Mishra stated, "The picture of the father and son on a bike in the winter stayed with me. We chose to play with a five-page screenplay I created." The length of the film was never figured out. The first cut was 54 minutes long, which is both long enough to qualify as a film and longer than a short. Finally, Mishra, who edited Dhuin himself, set the time limit at 50 minutes. The tempo as well as the framing give the impression of a little painting and create an instant closeness with the subjects. Dhuin was shot in the 4:3 aspect ratio, which is used by directors looking to map the mental landscapes of characters.

== Reception ==
- The exception of parts where Pankaj is seen walking around in despair, the camera is static for the majority of the scenes, illustrating the various facets of the town of Darbhanga. One of the scenes features Pankaj talking about Kiarostami and other filmmakers while they are sitting on the ground next to a monument in the dusk.
- The most illuminating scene is when he sits with a group of Mumbai-trained filmmakers who have travelled to Darbhanga to create a documentary about its history. Mishra almost forcefully unpacks the fiercest and most oppressive reach of fake cultural snobbery in this scenario.

== Festival appearances ==
- Jio MAMI Mumbai Film Festival 2022 (Online)
- International Documentary and Short Film Festival of Kerala 2022
- MoMA New York: Making Waves, A New Generation of Indian Independent Filmmakers 2022
- Dharamshala International Film Festival
- 75th Cannes Film Festival 2022
- Habitat International Film Festival
