= Boong =

2024 Manipuri film

- Theatrical release poster
- Directed by: Lakshmipriya Devi
- Written by: Lakshmipriya Devi
- Produced by: Farhan Akhtar; Vikesh Bhutani; Alan McAlex; Ritesh Sidhwani; Shujaat Saudagar
- Starring: Gugun Kipgen; Bala Hijam
- Cinematography: Tanay Satam
- Edited by: Shreyas Beltangdy
- Music by: Zubin Balaporia (original score); Akhu Chingangbam (original score)
- Production companies: Excel Entertainment; Chalkboard Entertainment; Suitable Pictures
- Distributed by: PVR Inox Pictures; AA Films
- Release dates: 5 September 2024 (TIFF); 19 September 2025 (India)
- Running time: 94 minutes
- Country: India
- Language: Meiteilon (Manipuri)

Boong is a 2024 Indian Manipuri-language coming-of-age drama film written and directed by Lakshmipriya Devi. It stars Gugun Kipgen, Bala Hijam, Angom Sanamatum, Vikram Kochhar, Nemetia Ngangbam, Jenny Khurai, and Hamom Sadananda.

The film had its world premiere at the Discovery section of the 2024 Toronto International Film Festival on 5 September 2024. At the 79th British Academy Film Awards, it won Best Children's & Family Film, and became the first Indian film to win a BAFTA.

== Premise ==
Brojendro, also called Boong is a schoolboy who lives with his mother, Mandakini in Imphal. After his father, Joykumar who left home to run a furniture shop in Moreh, stops contacting the family, Boong, refusing to believe rumours of his father's death, and his best friend Raju embark to find him and bring him back home.

== Cast ==
- Gugun Kipgen as Brojendro aka Boong
- Bala Hijam as Mandakini
- Angom Sanamatum as Raju Agarwal
- Vikram Kochhar as Sudhir Agarwal
- Nemetia Ngangbam as Juliana Kipgen
- Jenny Khurai as Singer JJ
- Hamom Sadananda as L. Joykumar
- Thoudam Brajabidhu as Mani, Pradhan
- Modhubala Thoudam as Chaobi
- Idhou as Ibobi
- Gurumayum Priyogopal as School Principal
- R.K. Sorojini as Sakhi

== Production ==
The production companies include Excel Entertainment, Chalkboard Entertainment and Suitable Pictures. The film was certified by CBFC with a "U" certificate in 2025.

== Release ==
It was released in select cities and cinemas at PVR INOX in India on 19 September 2025.

Following its historic achievement as the first Indian production to win the BAFTA Award for Best Children's & Family Film, Boong was re-released in Indian theatres on 6 March 2026. The film was screened across major metropolitan hubs and regional centres, including Delhi, Mumbai, Kolkata, Bengaluru, Guwahati, and Imphal at PVR Inox and other major cinema chains.

=== Film festivals ===
Boong received official selections at various international film festivals held in India and abroad.

Festival	Screening date(s)	Ref.
2024 Toronto International Film Festival	5, 8, 9 & 13 September 2024	
International South Asian Film Festival 2024, Canada	26 September 2024	
Warsaw International Film Festival 2024	11 October 2024	
48ª Mostra International De Cinema São Paulo Int'l Film Festival 2024	18 October 2024	
MAMI Mumbai Film Festival 2024	23 & 24 October 2024	
Adelaide Film Festival 2024	27 October & 2 November 2024	
Tallinn Black Nights Festival 2024	8, 11 & 21 November 2024	
25th San Diego Asian Film Festival 2024	13 November 2024	
55th International Film Festival of India	27 November 2024	
2nd Eikhoigi Imphal International Film Festival	9 February 2025	
BUFF International Film Festival 2025, Malmö	15 & 18 March 2025	
International Film Festival Gorinchem 2025	13 April 2025	
Kristiansand International Children's Film Festival 2025	5 & 9 May 2025	
17th Habitat Film Festival	18 May 2025	
8th Malaysia International Film Festival	July 2025	
Indian Film Festival, UK	22 & 23 July 2025	
Indian Film Festival of Melbourne 2025	18 August 2025	
National Indian Film Festival of Australia 2026	18 March 2026	

== Reception ==
Taylor Gates of Collider opined, "Boong is a rich coming-of-age tale that touches on important issues without ever losing its playful tone or big heart." Siddhant Adlakha of Variety wrote, "Devi, through her gentle approach to Boong’s story, centers an innocence and naiveté under threat from steadily brewing forces. And though she doesn’t train her lens on this steadily evolving scenario, she makes it an ever-present part of her movie’s fabric, as ensuring that this political texture remains inseparable from her intimate personal tale."

Calvin Law of The Asian Cut rated Boong 3.5 out of 5, calling it "a spirited and affecting little yarn" that tenderly explores Manipur's socio-political tensions through the eyes of a child, buoyed by Gugun Kipgen's charming lead performance. Nikhil Akhil of Film Fest Report wrote, "Director Lakshmipriya Devi's debut offers a heartfelt perspective on acceptance and transformation, presenting a 360-degree view of Manipur through the eyes of a curious child." Sahar Junejo of Lyca Radio commented, "Ten minutes into Lakshmipriya Devi's Boong, you immediately understand why Farhan Akhtar and Ritesh Sidhwani backed a film like this. It is such a funny, joyous snapshot of Manipur, you can't help but smile." Aribam Bishwajit of Imphal Review of Arts and Politics praised Boong for its layered depiction of maternal resilience, and socio-political unrest in Manipur, but also pointed out inconsistencies in cultural authenticity, language use, and certain Bollywood-style portrayals.

Boong was included in Firstpost’s list of “Five Manipuri Films You Need to Watch in 2026,” highlighting its recognition within contemporary Manipuri cinema.

== Accolades ==
Award	Category	Winner's name(s)	Result	Ref.
International South Asian Film Festival 2024, Canada	Excellence in Feature Filmmaking	Lakshmipriya Devi	Won	
55th International Film Festival of India	Best Debut Director of Indian Feature Film	Lakshmipriya Devi	Nominated	
17th Asia Pacific Screen Awards 2024, Australia	Best Youth Film	Lakshmipriya Devi, Alan McAlex, Vikesh Bhutani, Ritesh Sidhwani, Farhan Akhtar, Shujaat Saudagar	Won	
Indian Film Festival of Melbourne 2025	Best Actor (Male) - Special Mention	Gugun Kipgen	Won	
79th British Academy Film Awards	Best Children's & Family Film	Lakshmipriya Devi and Ritesh Sidhwani	Won	

== See also ==
- Meitei cinema in Australia
- Meitei cinema in Canada
