= Abundance in Millets =

2023 song by Falu and Gaurav Shah

"Abundance in Millets" is a 2023 song featuring Indian Prime Minister Narendra Modi and a husband and wife singing duo, Falu, and Gaurav Shah. The song is about millet, a super grain that may alleviate world hunger. The song was nominated for a Grammy Award in the Best Global Performance category, but it did not win.
