= Lakshmipriya Devi =

Indian filmmaker

- Education: Miranda House, University of Delhi
- Occupations: Film director; screenwriter
- Awards: BAFTA

Lakshmipriya Devi is an Indian filmmaker best known for directing the Manipuri language film Boong, which won the Best Children's and Family Film award at the 79th British Academy Film Awards in 2026. Boong made history by becoming the first Indian film to win in that category, gaining international recognition for its culturally rooted storytelling and emotional depth.
