= List of Indian submissions for the Academy Award for Best International Feature Film =

Best International Feature Film submissions from India

Highlights
- Debut: 1957
- Submissions: 59
- Nominations: 3
- Oscar winners: none

India has submitted films for the Academy Award for Best International Feature Film (formerly Academy Award for Best Foreign Language Film) (Note: The name change was proposed in April 2019 after the Academy deemed the word "Foreign" to be outdated.) since 1957, a year after the incorporation of the category. The award is given annually by the United States Academy of Motion Picture Arts and Sciences to a feature-length motion picture produced outside the United States that contains primarily non-English dialogue. The "Best Foreign Language Film" category was not created until 1956; however, between 1947 and 1955, the academy presented a non-competitive Honorary Award for the best foreign language films released in the United States.

As of 2026, India has been nominated three times, for Mother India (1957), Salaam Bombay! (1988), and Lagaan (2001).

== Submissions ==
Mother India (1967) the country's first submission, came close to winning but lost to Nights of Cabiria by a single vote.

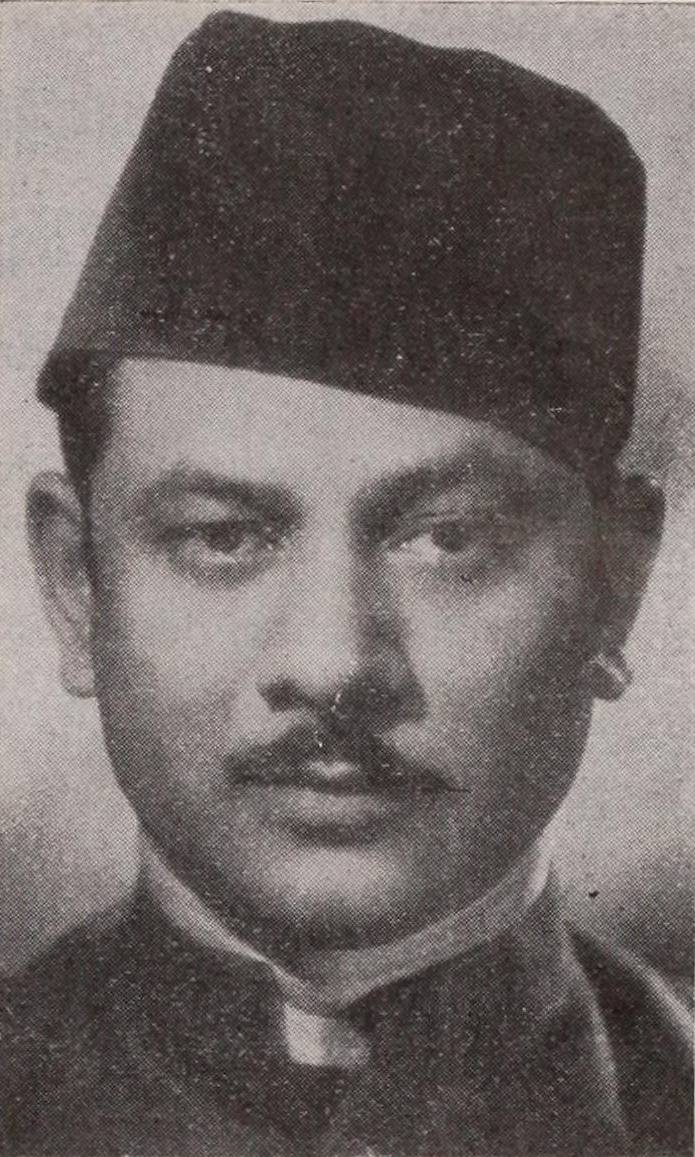
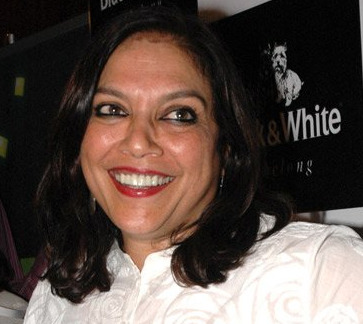
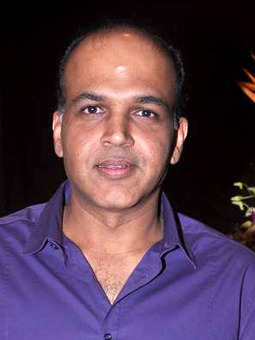
Mehboob Khan, Mira Nair, and Ashutosh Gowariker: the directors of the three Indian film to be nominated for the Academy Award for Best International Feature Film.

From the 59 films submitted, 36 of the which were Hindi films (including five Hindustani films, one Urdu film and one Hindi-Tamil bilingual film), three of which received nominations. Ten Tamil films (including one Hindi-Tamil bilingual film), four of each Malayalam and Marathi films, two of each Bengali and Gujarati films and one film of each Assamese and Telugu languages have been submitted.

Since 1984, India has not submitted a film on only one occasion; in 2003, the FFI controversially chose not make an entry as they felt no film would be in a position to compete with films from other nations.

In 2011, the jury of the 58th National Film Awards made a recommendation that the Best Film winners at the annual National Film Awards be chosen as the official entry.

Bengali filmmaker Satyajit Ray has represented India three times in this competition, the most by any director. As actors Kamal Haasan and Raghubir Yadav have been part of seven films submitted for the consideration—more than any other performer. One of Haasan's directorial effort was also submitted. Aamir Khan has represented India four times as an actor, including once as a director and four times as a producer; Lagaan (2001), which he produced and starred in, received a nomination.

Since the 2010s, the country has failed to submit a number of films considered favorites by critics to a nomination or win, especially: The Lunchbox (2013), RRR (2022) and All We Imagine as Light (2024). RRR went to win the Academy Award for Best Original Song.

The Film Federation of India (FFI) appoints a committee to choose one film among those released that year to be submitted as India's official entry. The chosen films, along with their English subtitles, are sent to the academy, where they are screened for the jury.

Below is a list of the films that have been submitted by India for review by the Academy for the award by year and the respective Academy Awards ceremony.

Year (Ceremony)	Film title used in nomination	Original title	Language	Director(s)	Result
1957 (30th)	Mother India	मदर इंडिया	Hindi	Mehboob Khan	Nominated (Note: The film lost to the Italian film Nights of Cabiria by one vote.)
1958 (31st)	Madhumati	मधुमती	Hindi	Bimal Roy	Not nominated
1959 (32nd)	The World of Apu	অপুর সংসার	Bengali	Satyajit Ray	Not nominated
1962 (35th)	Sahib Bibi Aur Ghulam	साहिब बीबी और ग़ुलाम	Hindi	Abrar Alvi	Not nominated
1963 (36th)	Mahanagar	মহানগর	Bengali	Satyajit Ray	Not nominated
1965 (38th)	Guide	गाइड	Hindi	Vijay Anand	Not nominated
1966 (39th)	Amrapali	आम्रपाली	Hindi	Lekh Tandon	Not nominated
1967 (40th)	Aakhri Khat	आख़री ख़त	Hindi	Chetan Anand	Not nominated
1968 (41st)	Majhli Didi	मझली दीदी	Hindi	Hrishikesh Mukherjee	Not nominated
1969 (42nd)	Deiva Magan	தெய்வ மகன்	Tamil	A. C. Tirulokchandar	Not nominated
1971 (44th)	Reshma Aur Shera	रेशमा और शेरा	Hindi	Sunil Dutt	Not nominated
1972 (45th)	Uphaar	उपहार	Hindi	Sudhendu Roy	Not nominated
1973 (46th)	Saudagar	सौदागर	Hindi	Sudhendu Roy	Not nominated
1974 (47th)	Garm Hava	گرم ہوا	Urdu	M. S. Sathyu	Not nominated
1977 (50th)	Manthan	मंथन	Hindi	Shyam Benegal	Not nominated
1978 (51st)	The Chess Players	शतरंज के खिलाड़ी	Hindi	Satyajit Ray	Not nominated
1980 (53rd)	Payal Ki Jhankaar	पायल की झंकार	Hindi	Satyen Bose	Not nominated
1984 (57th)	Saaransh	सारांश	Hindi	Mahesh Bhatt	Not nominated
1985 (58th)	Saagar	सागर	Hindi	Ramesh Sippy	Not nominated
1986 (59th)	Swathi Muthyam	స్వాతి ముత్యం	Telugu	K. Viswanath	Not nominated
1987 (60th)	Nayakan	நாயகன்	Tamil	Mani Ratnam	Not nominated
1988 (61st)	Salaam Bombay!	सलाम बॉम्बे	Hindi	Mira Nair	Nominated (Note: The film, India's second accepted nomination in 31 years, lost to the Danish film Pelle the Conqueror.)
1989 (62nd)	Parinda	परिंदा	Hindi	Vidhu Vinod Chopra	Not nominated
1990 (63rd)	Anjali	அஞ்சலி	Tamil	Mani Ratnam	Not nominated
1991 (64th)	Henna	हिना	Hindi	Randhir Kapoor	Not nominated
1992 (65th)	Thevar Magan	தேவர் மகன்	Tamil	Bharathan	Not nominated
1993 (66th)	Rudaali	रुदाली	Hindi	Kalpana Lajmi	Not nominated
1994 (67th)	Bandit Queen	बैंडिट क्वीन	Hindi	Shekhar Kapur	Not nominated
1995 (68th)	Kuruthipunal	குருதிப்புனல்	Tamil	P. C. Sreeram	Not nominated
1996 (69th)	Indian	இந்தியன்	Tamil	S. Shankar	Not nominated
1997 (70th)	Guru	ഗുരു	Malayalam	Rajiv Anchal	Not nominated
1998 (71st)	Jeans	ஜீன்ஸ்	Tamil	S. Shankar	Not nominated
1999 (72nd)	Earth	1947: अर्थ	Hindi	Deepa Mehta	Not nominated
2000 (73rd)	Hey Ram	ஹே ராம் हे राम	Tamil, Hindi	Kamal Haasan	Not nominated
2001 (74th)	Lagaan	लगान	Hindi	Ashutosh Gowariker	Nominated (Note: The film, being India's last accepted nomination to date, lost to the Bosnian film No Man's Land.)
2002 (75th)	Devdas	देवदास	Hindi	Sanjay Leela Bhansali	Not nominated
2004 (77th)	Shwaas	श्वास	Marathi	Sandeep Sawant	Not nominated
2005 (78th)	Paheli	पहेली	Hindi	Amol Palekar	Not nominated (Note: Morning Raga, an English film released during the same year, was submitted as an independent entry by its producers; neither film received the nomination.)
2006 (79th)	Rang De Basanti	रंग दे बसंती	Hindi	Rakeysh Omprakash Mehra	Not nominated (Note: Lage Raho Munna Bhai, a Hindi film released during the same year, was submitted as an independent entry; neither film received the nomination.)
2007 (80th)	Eklavya: The Royal Guard	एकलव्य: दी रॉयल गार्ड	Hindi	Vidhu Vinod Chopra	Not nominated
2008 (81st)	Taare Zameen Par	तारे ज़मीन पर	Hindi	Aamir Khan	Not nominated
2009 (82nd)	Harishchandra's Factory	हरिश्‍चंद्राची फॅक्टरी	Marathi	Paresh Mokashi	Not nominated
2010 (83rd)	Peepli Live	पीपली लाइव	Hindi	Anusha Rizvi	Not nominated
2011 (84th)	Abu, Son of Adam	ആദാമിന്റെ മകൻ അബു	Malayalam	Salim Ahamed	Not nominated
2012 (85th)	Barfi!	बर्फी!	Hindi	Anurag Basu	Not nominated
2013 (86th)	The Good Road	ધી ગુડ રોડ	Gujarati	Gyan Korrea	Not nominated
2014 (87th)	Liar's Dice	लायर्स डाइस	Hindi	Geetu Mohandas	Not nominated
2015 (88th)	Court	कोर्ट	Marathi	Chaitanya Tamhane	Not nominated
2016 (89th)	Visaranai	விசாரணை	Tamil	Vetrimaaran	Not nominated
2017 (90th)	Newton	न्यूटन	Hindi	Amit V. Masurkar	Not nominated
2018 (91st)	Village Rockstars	ৱিলে'জ ৰকষ্টাৰ্চ	Assamese	Rima Das	Not nominated
2019 (92nd)	Gully Boy	गली बॉय	Hindi	Zoya Akhtar	Not nominated
2020 (93rd)	Jallikattu	ജല്ലിക്കട്ട്	Malayalam	Lijo Jose Pellissery	Not nominated
2021 (94th)	Pebbles	கூழாங்கல்	Tamil	P. S. Vinothraj	Not nominated
2022 (95th)	Last Film Show	છેલ્લો શો	Gujarati	Pan Nalin	Made shortlist
2023 (96th)	2018	2018: എവരിവൺ ഇസ് എ ഹീറോ	Malayalam	Jude Anthany Joseph	Not nominated
2024 (97th)	Laapataa Ladies	लापता लेडीज़	Hindi	Kiran Rao	Not nominated
2025 (98th)	Homebound	होमबाउंड	Hindi	Neeraj Ghaywan	Made shortlist
2026 (99th)	Gondhal	गोंधळ	Marathi	Santosh Davakhar	Pending

== See also ==
- List of Indian Academy Award winners and nominees
- List of Academy Award–winning foreign-language films
- List of Academy Award winners and nominees for Best International Feature Film
- List of countries by number of Academy Awards for Best International Feature Film
