= Salaam Bombay! =

1988 Indian film by Mira Nair

- Theatrical release poster
- Directed by: Mira Nair
- Screenplay by: Sooni Taraporevala
- Story by: Mira Nair; Sooni Taraporevala
- Produced by: Mira Nair; Michael Nozik
- Starring: Shafiq Syed; Hansa Vithal; Chanda Sharma; Nana Patekar; Raghuvir Yadav; Anita Kanwar; Raju Bernad
- Cinematography: Sandi Sissel
- Edited by: Barry Alexander Brown
- Music by: L. Subramaniam
- Production companies: Cadrage; Channel Four Films; Doordarshan; La Sept Cinéma; Mirabai Films; NFDC
- Distributed by: Alliance (Canada); Cinecom Pictures (USA); Dendy Films (Australia); Transmundo Films (Argentina); Tamasa Distribution (France)
- Release dates: May 11, 1988 (Cannes Film Festival); September 13, 1988 (TIFF); October 7, 1988 (Worldwide)
- Running time: 113 minutes
- Country: India
- Language: Hindi
- Budget: $450,000
- Box office: est. $7.5 million (overseas)

Salaam Bombay! is a 1988 Indian Hindi-language drama film, produced and directed by Mira Nair, in her feature directorial debut. Nair's story idea was expanded into a screenplay by Sooni Taraporevala. Salaam Bombay! depicts the daily lives of children living in slums in Bombay (now Mumbai), India's largest city. It stars Shafiq Syed, Raghuvir Yadav, Anita Kanwar, Nana Patekar, Hansa Vithal and Chanda Sharma.

Nair's inspiration for the film came from the spirit of Bombay's street children and how they lived. Production began in early 1988, with the National Film Development Corporation of India co-financing the film.

Salaam Bombay! had its world premiere at the 1988 Cannes Film Festival, where it received critical acclaim and won the Caméra d'Or. After being released worldwide on 6 October 1988, Salaam Bombay! grossed an estimated $7.4 million at the overseas box office, against a production budget of $450,000. At the 61st Academy Awards, it became only the second Indian film to receive a nomination for Best Foreign Language Film. It has also won the National Film Award for Best Feature Film in Hindi, the National Board of Review Award for Best Foreign Language Film and three awards at the Montreal World Film Festival. The film was on the list of "The Best 1,000 Movies Ever Made" by The New York Times.

== Plot ==
Before the start of the film, Krishna has set fire to his elder brother's motorbike in retaliation for being bullied by him. His angry mother has taken him to the nearby Apollo Circus and told him that he can only come home when he has earned 500 rupees to pay for the damage. Krishna agrees and starts working for the circus.

The film begins as the circus is packing up to move on to its next site. His boss asks him to run an errand, but when Krishna returns, he finds that the circus has left. Alone, with nowhere to go and without the money to repay his mother, he travels to the nearest big city, Bombay. As soon as he arrives, he is robbed of his few possessions. He follows the thieves, befriends them, and ends up in the city's notorious red-light area of Falkland Road, near the Grant Road railway station.

One of the thieves, Chillum, a drug pusher and addict, helps Krishna get a job at the Grant Road Tea Stall and becomes a mentor of sorts to him. Baba, a local drug dealer, employs addicts like Chillum. Baba's wife, Rekha, is a prostitute, and they have a little daughter, Manju. Rekha is annoyed that she has to raise her daughter in such an environment. Baba had promised to start a new life elsewhere, but it is a promise that Baba cannot or will not fulfill.

Krishna gets a new name "Chaipau" and learns to live with it. His goal is still to raise the money he needs to return home, but he soon finds out that saving money in his new surroundings is next to impossible. To make matters worse, he has a crush on a teenage girl named "Sola Saal" (meaning "sixteen years"), who has been recently sold to the brothel. He sets fire to her room and attempts to escape with her, but they are caught. The fire causes Krishna to get a severe beating, while Sola Saal, who is considered valuable since she is still a virgin, denies starting the fire and tearfully tries to resist her enslavement. The madame of the house asks Baba to "tame her," which Baba agrees to do.

Meanwhile, Krishna, as well as working at the tea stall, works odd jobs to save some money and help Chillum, who cannot survive without drugs, especially after being sacked by Baba after a disastrous interview with a foreign journalist. Eventually, one of these odd jobs costs Krishna his job at the tea stall. To get more money, Krishna and his pals rob an elderly Parsi man by breaking into his house in broad daylight. Krishna eventually finds out that the money he has saved has been stolen by Chillum for drugs, with which Chillum has overdosed and died.

One night, while returning home from work with friends, Krishna and Manju are apprehended by the police and taken to a juvenile home. Krishna escapes and goes back to his world. He finds that a new recruit in Baba's drug business has taken Chillum's place and name. Krishna meets Sola Saal and tries to convince her to run away with him. She reveals that she is charmed by Baba and no longer interested in Krishna; she is driven away to service her first 'client'. Meanwhile, Rekha is told that the authorities will not release their daughter because the mother is a prostitute. An angry Rekha decides to leave Baba, but Baba beats her as punishment. She is saved by the timely intervention of Krishna who, in a fit of rage, kills Baba and attempts to run away with her, but they become separated in a parade honoring Ganesh. The film ends with a slow zoom in on Krishna's dejected face.

== Cast ==
- Shafiq Syed as Krishna, nicknamed Chaipau
- Raghuvir Yadav as Chillum (credited as Raghubir Yadav)
- Hansa Vithal as Manju
- Anita Kanwar as Rekha
- Nana Patekar as Baba
- Chanda Sharma as Sola Saal, nicknamed Sweet Sixteen
- Irrfan Khan as Letter writer
- Sanjana Kapoor as Foreigner reporter

== Production ==
=== Writing and inspiration ===
"One of my first images was of kids surrounding my taxi at a traffic junction- blowing bubbles, singing, a maimed kid on a makeshift skateboard. These were clearly children living in a world where fate had given them nothing but life. Yet they lived with a certain style, a flamboyance. This attracted me. Their physicality, their faces and bodies, were like a map of the journey they had gone through to come to Bombay."
— Mira Nair

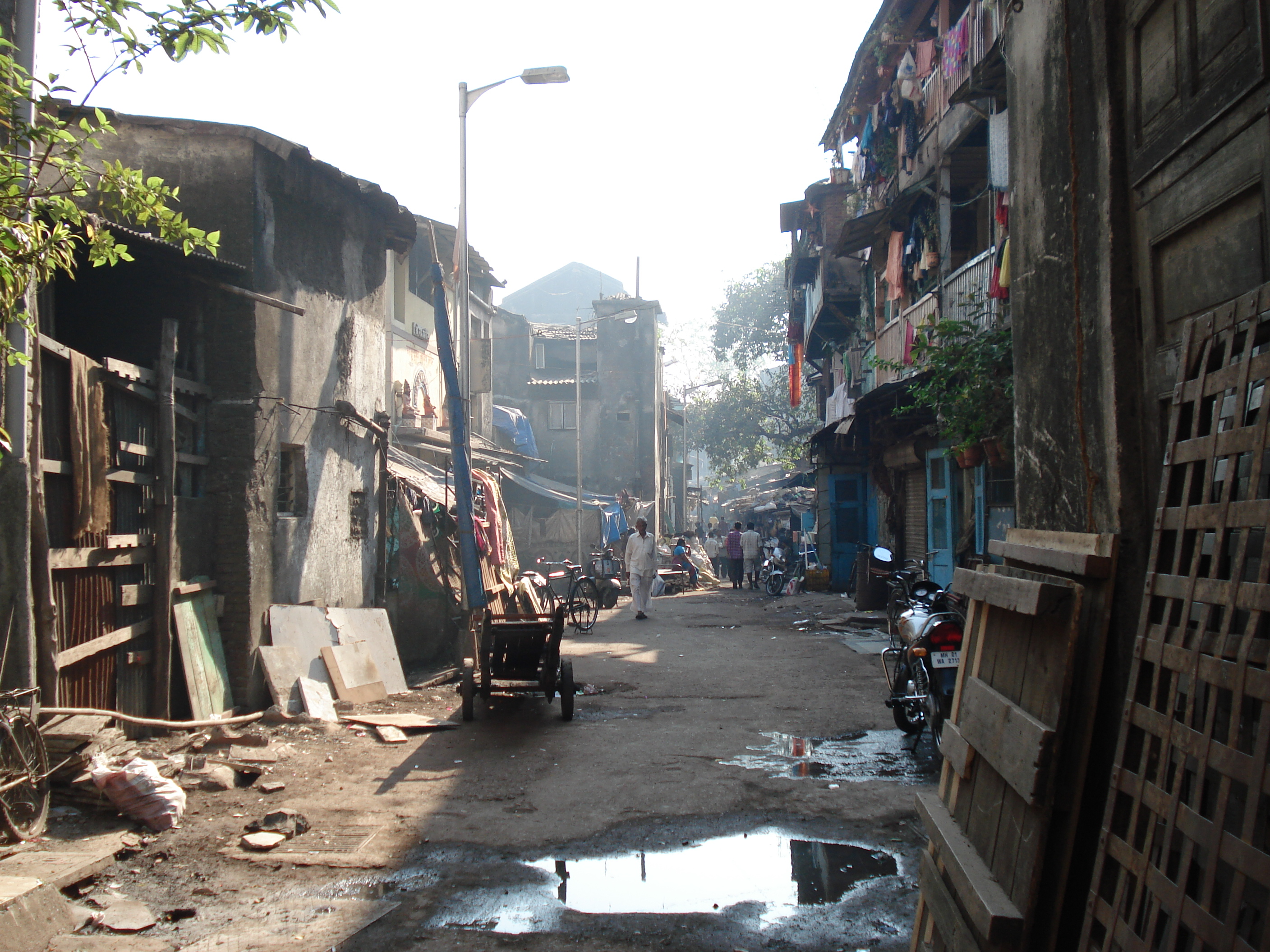
The 1st lane of Kamathipura, Bombay

Nair records that the initial inspiration came from the spirit of Bombay's street children. Her ideas developed when she researched their lives with her creative partner Sooni Taraporevala. From the beginning, they decided that real street children would play in the film since the combination of childhood and knowledge in their faces would be hard to find among professional child actors.

Nair was also inspired to make the film after watching Héctor Babenco's 1981 drama Pixote. She said, "on the first day of shooting, I received the news that the child actor who played the character of Pixote was shot dead in the street. After this incident, I was more determined to make Salaam Bombay!, and decided to share the film's dividends with street children if we could." After making four documentaries, Salaam Bombay! was Nair's first full-length feature film.

=== Funding ===
Initially, Cadrage, Channel Four Films, Doordarshan, La Sept Cinéma, Mirabai Films and the National Film Development Corporation of India funded the production. Several producers co-produced the film with Nair, with Gabriel Auer from France as the executive producer, Michael Nozik from the UK and Anil Tejani from India and Cherry Rogers as the co-executive producers. Also in co-production were Jane Balfour and co-producer Mitch Epstein.

=== Filming ===
Krishna and Sola Saal in Salaam Bombay!

Principal photography primarily took place on Falkland Road, a red light district in Kamathipura, Bombay. The child actors were real street children. The cast received drama training at a workshop in Bombay before filming. Child psychologist Dinaz Stafford found the children, worked with them and assisted in the acting workshop run by Barry John. A room was rented near the Grant Road railway station for rehearsals, where about 130 children rehearsed on the first day. Later, before appearing in the film, a group of 24 street children were trained in a workshop, where they were given music, dance and acting training. Gradually, the stories of the city of Bombay, their parents, sex, trafficking, drug dealing, gangs and their profiteering were learned from them. Some were reunited with their families before the film was shot. They were paid, had medical treatment, and some of that money was left as a fixed deposit. Irrfan Khan made his film debut as a letter writer in a two-minute scene.

After its release, director Nair with Stafford established an organization called the Salaam Baalak Trust in 1989 to rehabilitate the children who appeared in the film. The Salaam Baalak Trust now lends support to street children in Bombay, Delhi and Bhubaneshwar. As of 2009, Shafiq Sayed, who played Krishna in the film, was an auto rickshaw driver in Bangalore.

=== Music and soundtrack ===
Salaam Bombay!: Music from the Original Motion Picture Soundtrack, of the film was composed, performed, and directed by L. Subramaniam, was released on cassette and CD versions in 1986 from DRG Music Publishing. The song "Mera Naam Chin Chin Choo" was written by Qamar Jalalabadi, composed by O. P. Nayyar and sung by Geeta Dutt for the 1958 film Howrah Bridge is included in the film soundtrack. Also in a scene at the movie theatre, Sridevi's dance to the song "Hawa Hawaii" sung by Kavita Krishnamurti from the 1987 film Mr. India is performed.

Salaam Bombay!: Music from the Original Motion Picture Soundtrack

Soundtrack album by L. Subramaniam
- Released: 1988
- Genres: Stage & Screen
- Length: 45:37
- Label: DRG

Professional ratings
Review scores
| Source | Rating |
|---|---|
| Allmusic | 2.5/5 stars |

==== Track listing ====
All music is composed by L. Subramaniam, Mera Naam Chin Chin Choo composed by Qamar Jalalabadi / O. P. Nayyar.

Salaam Bombay!: Music from the Original Motion Picture Soundtrack
| No. | Title | Performed by | Length |
|---|---|---|---|
| 1. | "Main Titles" | L. Subramaniam | 3:21 |
| 2. | "Chaipau's Theme" | L. Subramaniam | 1:23 |
| 3. | "The Entry of Solasaal" | L. Subramaniam | 1:33 |
| 4. | "Chick Melody" | L. Subramaniam | 0:54 |
| 5. | "Mera Naam Chin Chin Choo" | Geeta Dutt | 3:24 |
| 6. | "Chillum's Theme" | L. Subramaniam | 4:56 |
| 7. | "Manju's Theme" | L. Subramaniam | 1:11 |
| 8. | "Chaipau's Theme" | L. Subramaniam | 0:56 |
| 9. | "Street Children Sing a Ballad of Lost Promises" | L. Subramaniam | 1:54 |
| 10. | "Souls of Dead Children Floating" | L. Subramaniam | 1:11 |
| 11. | "Escape From the Chiller Room" | L. Subramaniam | 2:12 |
| 12. | "Baba Kisses Solasaal" | L. Subramaniam | 1:21 |
| 13. | "Farewell to Manju" | L. Subramaniam | 2:25 |
| 14. | "Chaipau Helps Chillum Across the Tracks" | L. Subramaniam | 1:15 |
| 15. | "The Funeral Procession" | L. Subramaniam | 4:31 |
| 16. | "Chaipau Sets Fire to Solasaal's Bed" | L. Subramaniam | 1:13 |
| 17. | "Solasaal's Theme" | L. Subramaniam | 1:01 |
| 18. | "Escape From the Chiller Room" | L. Subramaniam | 2:54 |
| 19. | "Medley: Aartis for the Ganpati Festival" | L. Subramaniam | 2:18 |
| 20. | "Chaipau Alone" | L. Subramaniam | 2:21 |
| 21. | "End Credit Music" | L. Subramaniam | 3:23 |

== Release ==
Before commercial release, the film premiered at the Directors' Fortnight at the Cannes Film Festival on May 20 1988. It was later screened at the Toronto International Film Festival on 13 September 1988 and on 7 October at the 26th New York Film Festival,.

The film's theatrical release was on 24 August 1988 in France, on 13 September in India, a limited release on 7 October in United States, and in other countries in late 1988 and early 1989.

=== Re-releases ===
The film was re-released in France on 12 December 2001 and 7 January 2015. In 2005, it was also screened at the New Horizons Film Festival in Poland on 23 July.

It was re-released in Indian theatres in March 2013. In 2015, at the BFI London Film Festival, the film was screened on 9 October, and on 18 October at the Tallgrass Film Festival in the United States.

== Reception ==
"In that respect Salaam Bombay! is quite different from Pixote, the 1981 film about Brazilian street children. Although the two films obviously have much in common, the children of Pixote exist in an anarchic and savage world, while those in "Salaam Bombay!" share a community, however humble."

— Roger Ebert, Salaam Bombay!, rogerebert.com

Salaam Bombay! received mainly positive reviews from critics who commented on the cultural and social impact of the film. On the film review aggregator website Rotten Tomatoes, the film has an approval rating of 94% based on 31 reviews. The site's critical consensus reads, "Salaam Bombay! examines life in a part of the world that many viewers have never visited - but does so with enough compassion and grace to make them feel as if they have." Metacritic, which uses a weighted average, assigned the film a score of 79 out of 100, based on 18 critics, indicating "generally favorable" reviews.

Roger Ebert wrote, "The history of the making of "Salaam Bombay!" is almost as interesting as the film itself." English writer Hilary Mantel commented, "A warm and lively film, made by Mira Nair with only a handful of professional actors." Ted Shen of Chicago Reader wrote that, "like Hector Babenco's Pixote the film is unsparingly gritty, but with a woman's tenderness it also grants the characters an occasional moment of grace." Richard Corliss of Time magazine wrote that, "Salaam Bombay! deserves a broad audience, not just to open American eyes to plights of hunger and homelessness abroad, but to open American minds to the vitality of a cinema without rim shots and happy endings." American film critic Dave Kehr stated, "Much to Nair`s credit, she exploits neither the exoticism of her locale (there are no tour-guide, look-at-this flourishes) nor the misery of her subjects (suffer they may, but they do not demand pity)." American film critic David Sterritt stated, "the movie is terrifically well-acted and beautifully filmed, however, marking an auspicious feature-film debut for Indian-American director Mira Nair." Peter Travers commented that "poetic, powerful and disturbing, Salaam Bombay! transcends language and cultural barriers.

Emanuel Levy thought that the film "drew its intensity and colour from its locale, the slums of Bombay." Vincent Canby says, "for a film about such hopelessness, Salaam Bombay! is surprisingly cheering." Christopher Null wrote, "with Salaam, Nair proves an early ability with a camera and at getting performances out of obviously inexperienced actors, but her writing talents are much sketchier." Rita Kempley of The Washington Post wrote, "Nair's film has been compared to Hector Babenco's chilling "Pixote," a Brazilian look at a 10-year-old street criminal, but hers is a more compassionate, though equally troubling, portrait." On movie review site Rediff.com critic Sukanya Verma commented, Salaam Bombay! "still brilliant in 25 years."

=== Accolades ===
List of awards and nominations
| Organisation | Date of the ceremony | Category | Nominee(s) | Result | Ref.(s) |
|---|---|---|---|---|---|
| Cannes Film Festival | May, 1988 | Caméra d'Or | Mira Nair | Won | |
| Cannes Film Festival | May, 1988 | Audience Award | Mira Nair | Won | |
| Los Angeles Film Critics Association | 10 December 1988 | New Generation Award: | Mira Nair | Won | |
| Los Angeles Film Critics Association | 10 December 1988 | Best Foreign Film | Mira Nair | Nominated | |
| National Board of Review | 13 December 1988 | Top foreign films | Mira Nair | Won | |
| Boston Society of Film Critics | 1988 | Best Foreign-Language Film | Mira Nair | Won | |
| Los Angeles Women in Film Festival | 1988 | Lillian Gish Award (Excellence in Feature Film) | Mira Nair | Won | |
| Montreal World Film Festival | 1988 | Jury Prize | Mira Nair | Won | |
| Montreal World Film Festival | 1988 | Air Canada Award for Most Popular Film of the Festival | Mira Nair | Won | |
| Montreal World Film Festival | 1988 | Prize of the Ecumenical Jury | Mira Nair | Won | |
| Golden Globe Awards | 28 January 1989 | Best Foreign Language Film | Mira Nair | Nominated | |
| César Awards | 4 March 1989 | Best Foreign Film | Mira Nair | Nominated | |
| Academy Awards | 29 March 1989 | Best International Feature Film | Mira Nair | Nominated | |
| National Film Awards | May 1989 | Best Feature Film in Hindi | Mira Nair | Won | |
| National Film Awards | May 1989 | Best Child Artist | Shafiq Syed | Won | |
| Annonay International Film Festival | 1989 | Prix du Public | Mira Nair | Won | |
| British Academy Film Awards | 11 March 1990 | Best Film Not in the English Language | Mira Nair | Nominated | |
| Filmfare Awards | 1990 | Best Film | Mira Nair | Nominated | |
| Filmfare Awards | 1990 | Best Director | Mira Nair | Nominated | |
| Filmfare Awards | 1990 | Best Supporting Actress | Anita Kanwar | Nominated | |

=== Box office ===
Salaam Bombay! earned US$2,080,046 in the United States and Canada, from 506,100 ticket sales. In France, the film sold 633,899 tickets;. In Germany, the film sold 258,728 tickets;

The film also sold 346 tickets in Switzerland and Spain since 1996, adding up to total overseas footfalls of 1,399,073 tickets sold in the United States, France, Germany, Switzerland and Spain.

Against a production budget of $450,000, the film grossed an estimated total of US$7,434,176 in overseas markets, becoming one of the highest-grossing Indian films in overseas markets at that time.

== See also ==
- List of Indian submissions for the Academy Award for Best Foreign Language Film
- List of submissions to the 61st Academy Awards for Best Foreign Language Film
- Salaam Baalak Trust – Indian non-profit child welfare organization
