= Campaigning in the 2014 Indian general election =

Indian lower house election campaign

- 7 April 2014 – 12 May 2014

543 of the 545 seats in the Lok Sabha 272 seats needed for a majority
- Opinion polls
- Registered: 834,082,814
- Turnout: 66.44% (▲8.23pp)
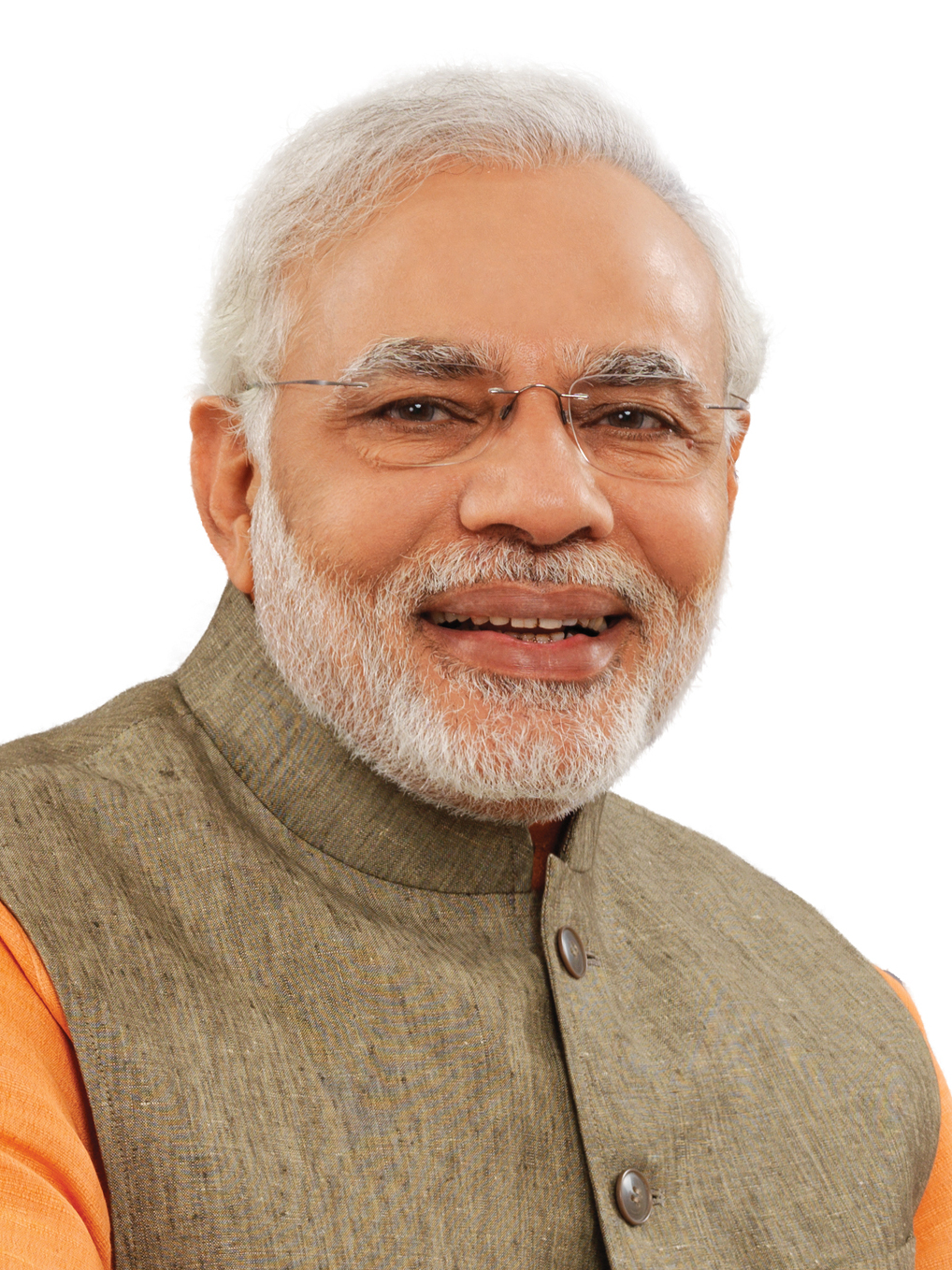

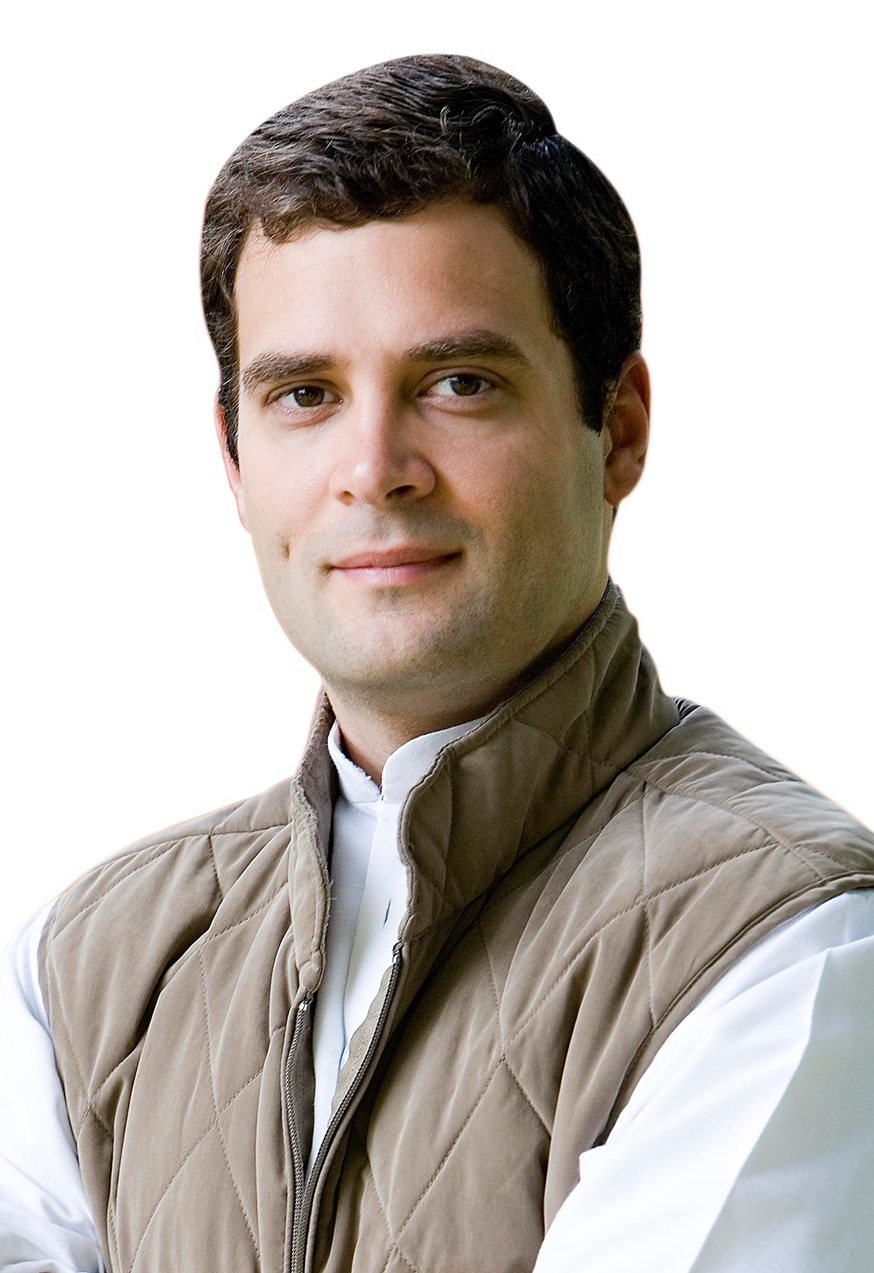
	First party	Second party
Leader	Narendra Modi	Rahul Gandhi
Party	BJP	INC
Alliance	NDA	UPA
Last election	18.80%, 116 seats	28.55%, 206 seats
Seats won	282	44
Seat change	▲166	▼162
Popular vote	171,660,230	106,935,942
Percentage	31.00%	19.31%
Swing	▲12.20pp	▼9.24pp
Alliance seats	336	59
- Results by constituency
Prime Minister before election
Manmohan Singh
INC
Prime Minister after election
Narendra Modi
BJP

The Indian general election of 2014 were held to constitute the 16th Lok Sabha in India. Voting took place in all 543 parliamentary constituencies of India to elect members of parliament in the Lok Sabha. The result of this election was declared on 16 May. The 15th Lok Sabha completed its constitutional mandate on 31 May 2014. Since the last general election in 2009, the 2011 Indian anti-corruption movement by Anna Hazare, and other similar moves by Baba Ramdev, have gathered momentum and political interest. Issues such as Inflation, price rise and corruption were some of the chief issues.

== Social media ==
There has been much commentary about the large role that social media is expected to play in this general election. The expenditure on social media by political parties has been estimated to be around Rs. 5 billion. In view of this, the Election Commission announced that they would be keeping tabs on the expenditure on social media by political parties and candidates. A group launched a non-partisan popular website called Let's Pray for India where people can adopt a constituency that they will pray for during the election.

== Manifestos ==
Indian National Congress released its manifesto on 29 March 2014. Rights to health, homestead and anti-corruption Bill are the main promises made in its manifesto. Bharatiya Janata Party released its manifesto on 7 April, promising good governance, improving economy and infrastructure, ending policy paralysis and curbing corruption. The BJP was unusually late in releasing their manifesto, doing so on the first day of polling. The 'unprecedented' delay was criticised for depriving the people of Assam and Tripura, who voted in the first phase, an opportunity to know the contents of the manifesto before voting.

== Controversies ==
Just prior to a scheduled election rally of Narendra Modi in Patna in October 2013, eight bombs exploded causing five deaths. On 27 April, near to a National Conference rally by its chairman, Farooq Abdullah, an explosion was heard, though no one was injured. The police issued a statement that the sounds came from the Khanyar neighbourhood and they were investigating it. They also reported another blast in central Kashmir's Magam in Budgam district that caused three injured.

In a speech by INC Foreign Minister Salman Khurshid at the School of Oriental and African Studies in London, UK, he criticised the Supreme Court of India and the Election Commission. He said the former's judgement disqualifying convicted lawmakers was not a law but "a judge-made law" and that the Election Commission's guidelines were effectively saying that "you should do or say nothing that wins you an election. You should try your best to lose elections." He also criticised Modi for being ineffective during the 2002 Gujarat riots. Modi then criticised him for his discussion abroad: "This Indian National Congress should be renamed Institutions Neglecting Congress. They break and demean all constitutional institutions. It is their habit to misuse such institutions." It follows the INC's nomination of candidates with corruption allegations.

Aam Aadmi Party leader Kumar Viswas stirred up a controversy when it was revealed that five years ago he had referred to nurses from Kerala as dark skinned and indirectly implying that they were ugly. It triggered a chain of reactions from all over the country. Kejriwal then apologised for the incident.

In one of the most controversial action, Narendra Modi, the PM candidate of NDA, showed the symbol of his party BJP and made a speech after casting his vote in Gandhinagar on 30 April 2014, violating the provisions of Sections 126 (1)(a) and 126 (l)(b) of R P Act 1951. ECI directed the Gujarat government to file complaints or FIR against him and others involved in the political meeting and asked the Gujarat Chief Secretary and DGP to send a compliance report by 6 pm on the same day. ECI even directed to file complaints against all the TV channels and other electronic media which carried the proceedings of the meeting and displayed the election matter and asked the Gujarat administration to file separate FIR against under Section 126 (l) (b) against those channels. Meanwhile, after the directions from ECI, two FIRs were registered on 30 April 2014 against Narendra Modi for violation of model code for elections by the Gujarat police.

=== Electoral ===
In Birbhum, Joy Banerjee, Bengali actor and BJP candidate from Birbhum was caught on camera distributing money to villagers violating model code of conduct. However Joy Banerjee and BJP president Rahul Sinha denied the charge. Joy Banerjee said he paid a villager for some things he bought.

Inclusion of Pramod Muthalik head of Sri Ram Sene, who was involved in 2009 Mangalore pub attack, in BJP stirred a controversy. As Congress, CPIM and CPI latched on this issue and attack BJP, the party took a U-turn and canceled Pramod Muthalik's membership. Later Arun Jaitley said that inclusion of Muthalik in BJP was a mistake.

On 23 March, Sharad Pawar's comment regarding erasing the ink and voting twice made Election Commission of India issuing show cause notice asking him to explain his remarks. Later in his reply to ECI, he said that he regrets his infamous 'ink' remarks.

The digital version release of AIADMK leader Jayalalitha starrer movie Aayirathil Oruvan during the campaign came in trouble following the issue of the model code of conduct by the ECI. It then ordered local authorities in Tamil Nadu's southern districts to remove film posters showing Jayalalitha and AIADMK founder M. G. Ramachandran.

The election commission told the petroleum ministry not to change prices for natural gas products until the election was over. An increase in prices was due to take effect on 1 April; Kejriwal took credit for the application to defer the change.

In March 2014, a video clip surfaced in which Masood was seen threatening Modi. On 29 March, he was arrested by police for his hate speech.

On 8 April, Samajwadi Party leader Azam Khan said that only Muslim soldiers are to be credited for the Kargil War victory which was termed communal and condemned by both the INC and BJP alike.

Semi-nude poses by model Meghna Patel in support of Modi created a stir amongst the BJP. Similarly, Tanisha Singh stripped in support of Rahul Gandhi.

Modi's campaign manager in Uttar Pradesh, Amit Shah, had been banned from electoral rallies and meetings in April for a speech that was deemed to have stirred tensions with minority Muslims in which he said voters should reject parties with Muslim candidates and that Muslims in Uttar Pradesh had raped, killed and humiliated Hindus. The ECI then rescinded the ban saying that Shah had lodged an appeal vowing not to use "abusive or derogatory language" and that the ECI would monitor his campaigning using video tracking.

The ECI banned Baba Ramdev from campaigning in Lucknow, Uttar Pradesh after saying that people should not make "malicious" statements about the private lives of individuals and those who violated the directive would not be allowed to hold rallies during the election. In turn the police announced that they had charged Ramdev with making "false statements" after an analysis of video footage. The statement was that "[Rahul Gandhi] goes to Dalits' house for honeymoon and picnic. Had he married a Dalit girl, then his luck could have clicked and he would have become the prime minister." Ramdev then said in regards to the controversy that the statement was "misrepresented. The term 'honeymoon period is over' is commonly used in political language." However, the INC's Rashid Alvi claimed that Ramdev has "insulted the Dalit community...there are certain crimes which cannot be pardoned." Dalit BJP leader Udit Raj, however, said of the statement that Ramdev had not said anything "wrong" against Dalits and that his intention was not "wrong." The ECI later banned him from holding camps in Himachal Pradesh.

In a controversial action, Narendra Modi displayed the symbol of his party BJP and made a speech after casting his vote in Gandhinagar on 30 April 2014, violating the provisions of Sections 126 (1)(a) and 126 (l)(b) of R P Act 1951. ECI directed the Gujarat government to file complaints or FIR against him and others involved in the political meeting and asked the Gujarat Chief Secretary and DGP to send a compliance report by 6 pm on the same day. ECI even directed to file complaints against all the TV channels and other electronic media which carried the proceedings of the meeting and displayed the election matter and asked the Gujarat administration to file separate FIR against under Section 126 (l) (b) against those channels. Meanwhile, after the directions from ECI, two FIRs were registered on 30 April 2014 against Narendra Modi for violation of model code for elections by the Gujarat police.

=== Insensitive Comments in election rallies ===
On 10 April 2014, at an election rally, Samajwadi Party leader Mulayam Singh Yadav created a controversy when he commented that "When boys and girls have differences, the girl gives a statement that 'the boy raped me,' and that poor boy gets a death sentence." Referring to the Mumbai gang rape, Yadav stated, "... later they had differences, and the girl went and gave a statement that I have been raped. And then the poor fellows, three of them have been sentenced to death. Should rape cases lead to hanging? Boys are boys, they make mistakes. Two or three have been given the death sentence in Mumbai." Following this, complaints were filed against Yadav with the Election Commission and the National Commission for Women (NCW). His comments were denounced by the Indian media, women's groups, women's rights activists, and the public prosecutor in the Shakti Mills gang rape case Ujjwal Nikam. Despite the backlash for his comments, Yadav achieved victory in the elections for Mainpuri constituency.

== Telangana ==
ON 30 July 2013, the Congress Working Committee unanimously passed a resolution for the creation of Telangana. It formally requested the INC-led UPA government to make steps in accordance with the Constitution of India for the bifurcation of Andhra Pradesh and the creation of Telangana. This was seen as an attempt by the INC to merge the Telangana Rashtra Samiti into itself for the general and provincial election after being marginalised in the Rayalseema and coastal regions by the YSR Congress. All-India Congress Committee general secretary for Andhra Pradesh Digvijay Singh said that TRS leader K. Chandrashekhar Rao had "repeatedly said that once Telangana was announced, he would merge his party with the Congress. We will await his decision and will be favourably inclined to accept the offer of a merger." TRS welcomed the decision, with Rao saying that his party was fine with Hyderabad being the joint capital for 10 years; Ongole was then suggested as the new capital of Andhra Pradesh. YSR Congress party leader Jaganmohan Reddy said that he opposed the decision and would agitate against it, as all its MLAs resigned over the issue. However, former party member Konda Surekha attacked the party and its leader saying that he had backtracked on plenary party meeting supporting the issue. Andhra Pradesh BJP president G. Kishan Reddy gave credit for the move to Gujarat Chief Minister Narendra Modi in saying that the INC took active interest in the issue after Modi had announced a tour to Hyderabad for 11 August. The BJP national spokesperson Prakash Javadekar suggested that the INC move was under pressure and "that's why we will watch carefully and see whether the intention again to backstab or to really give Telangana, and will watch till Telangana is formed." He added that the BJP supports the creation of "Telangana and Vidarbha's demand. [The] announcement is the victory of the people of Telangana. BJP has always been in favour of Telangana. Congress promised it in 2004 but dilly-dallied for nine years. It has been a story of the struggle of the people of Telangana and nine years of betrayal by the Congress. The NDA's agenda in 1999 promised creation of three states, and it was honoured. The Congress, in contrast, made a promise in 2004 but betrayed people for nine years." BJP national President Rajnath Singh re-iterated support and added, in regards to requests for the creation of Gorkhaland and Bodoland, "We were in favour of the Second States Reorganisation Commission earlier too. We now demand that the government should set it up and seek a report within a specific timeframe. The Gorkha Janmukti Morcha also reacted in announcing an indefinite strike in calling for Gorkhaland. Meanwhile, the national Home Ministry said that due to the lack of development in the proposed areas and the proximity to other hotbeds in Chhattisgarh's Bastar and Maharashtra's Gadchiroli regions it could turn into a hotbed for the activities of the banned Communist Party of India (Maoist) if the administration is not quickly consolidated. In February, Chief Minister of Andhra Pradesh Kiran Kumar Reddy resigned over the proposal to partition the region and launched a Samaikyandhra political party.

== See also ==
- 2014 Indian general election
- Opinion polling for the Indian general election, 2014
- Indian National Congress campaign for Indian general election, 2014
- Bharatiya Janata Party campaign for Indian general election, 2014
- 2009 Indian general election campaign controversies
