= Opinion polling for the 2019 Indian general election =

Indian lower house election opinion poll

In the run up to the Indian general election, 2019, various organisations carried out opinion polls to gauge voting intention in India. Results of such polls are displayed in this article. The date range for these opinion polls are from the Jan 2018 to April 2019. Many organisations have gone on to conduct exit polls and post-poll surveys as well, which too are displayed.

== Background ==
Opinion polls in India can be controversial. These charges include partisan manipulation.

Opinion poll methodology has heavily improved and agencies like CSDS have got it absolutely correct on 16 occasions, roughly correct on 7 occasions and wrong on 4 occasions.

Post-poll surveys or Exit polls, widely published, are fundamentally different from opinion polls.

== Opinion polls ==
Number of seats projected in opinion polls per alliance over time.

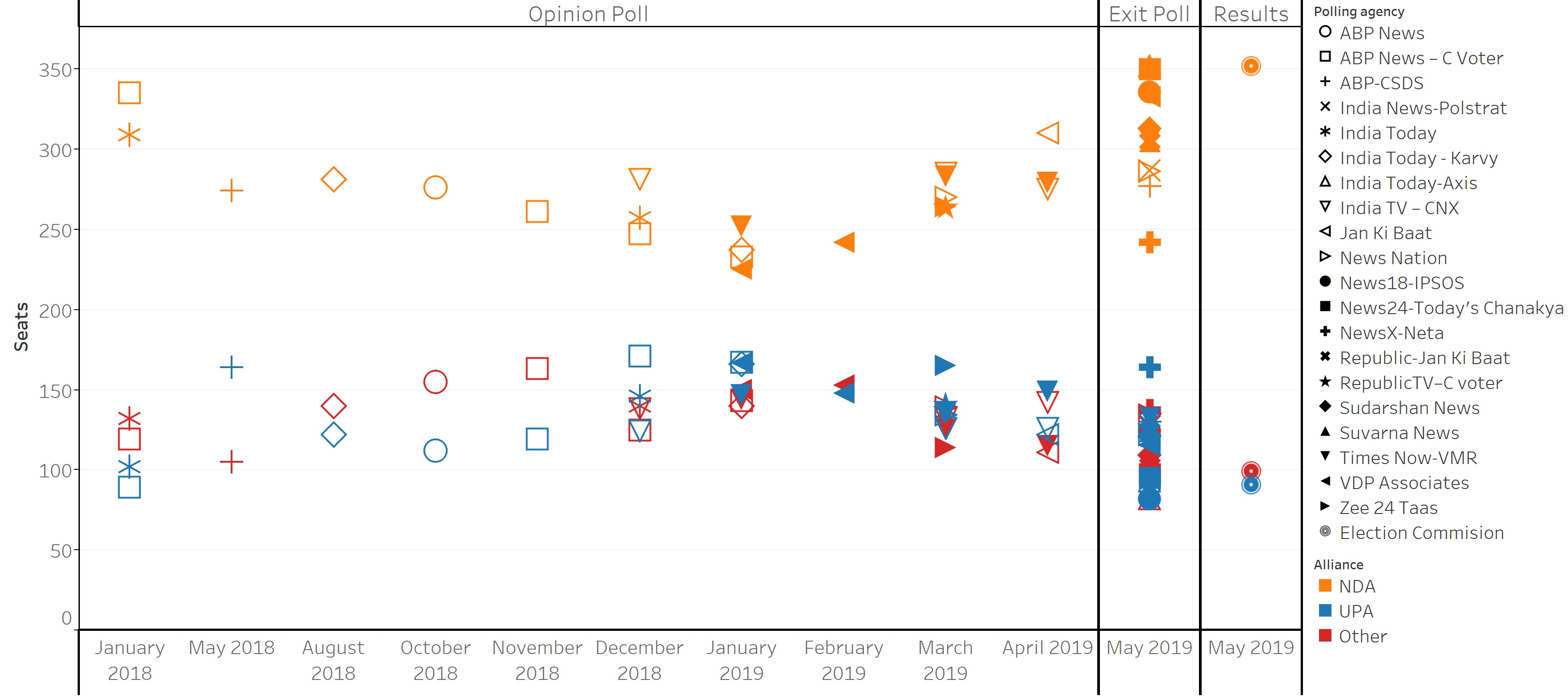
Indian General Election Trends - 2019

Various organisations carried out opinion polling to gauge voting intentions in India. The results of such polls are displayed in this list. The date range for these opinion polls is from the previous general election, held in April and May 2014, to the present day. The ECI banned the release of exit polls from 11 April to 19 May, the last phase of the elections. The commission also banned the publication or broadcast in the media of predictions made by astrologers and tarot card readers.

Poll type	Date published	Polling agency			Others	Majority	Ref
Poll type	Date published	Polling agency	NDA	UPA	Others	Majority	Ref
Opinion polls	8 April 2019	Times Now-VMR	279	149	115	7	
Opinion polls	6 April 2019	India TV-CNX	275	126	142	3	
Opinion polls	Mar 2019	Times Now-VMR	283	135	125	11	
Opinion polls	Mar 2019	News Nation	270	134	139	Hung	
Opinion polls	Mar 2019	CVoter	264	141	138	Hung	
Opinion polls	Mar 2019	India TV-CNX	285	126	132	13	
Opinion polls	Mar 2019	Zee 24 Taas	264	165	114	Hung	
Opinion polls	Feb 2019	VDP Associates	242	148	153	Hung	
Opinion polls	Jan 2019	Times Now-VMR	252	147	144	Hung	
Opinion polls	Jan 2019	ABP News-CVoter	233	167	143	Hung	
Opinion polls	Jan 2019	India Today-Karvy	237	166	140	Hung	
Opinion polls	Jan 2019	VDP Associates	225	167	150	Hung	
Opinion polls	Dec 2018	India Today	257	146	140	Hung	
Opinion polls	Dec 2018	ABP News-CVoter	247	171	125	Hung	
Opinion polls	Dec 2018	India TV-CNX	281	124	138	9	
Opinion polls	Nov 2018	ABP News-CVoter	261	119	163	Hung	
Opinion polls	Oct 2018	ABP News	276	112	155	4	
Opinion polls	Aug 2018	India Today-Karvy	281	122	140	9	
Opinion polls	May 2018	ABP News-CSDS	274	164	105	2	
Opinion polls	Jan 2018	CVoter	335	89	119	63	
Opinion polls	Jan 2018	India Today	309	102	132	37	

== Vote share ==
Date published	Polling agency			Others	Lead
Date published	Polling agency	NDA	UPA	Others	Lead
Mar 2019	News Nation	34%	28%	38%	6%
Mar 2019	ABP News – C voter	41%	31%	28%	10%
Jan 2019	Times Now-VMR	38.7%	32.6%	28.7%	6.1%
Jan 2019	CVoter	37.6%	32.2%	30.2%	5.4%
Jan 2019	India Today -Karvy	35%	33%	32%	2%
April–May 2014	2014 General election results	36.0%	23.0%	42.0%	13.0%

== Polling on politicians ==
=== Narendra Modi vs Rahul Gandhi ===
Date published	Polling agency			Lead
Date published	Polling agency	Narendra Modi	Rahul Gandhi	Lead
Jan 2019	India Today	60%	24%	36%
Jan 2019	India TV - CNX	41%	23%	18%
Nov 2018	ABP News- C Voter	56%	36%	20%
Oct 2018	ABP News- CSDS	60%	34%	26%
Jan 2018	ABP News- CSDS	66%	28%	38%
2017	ABP News- CSDS	69%	26%	43%

=== Narendra Modi vs Priyanka Gandhi ===
Date published	Polling agency			Lead
Date published	Polling agency	Yes	No	Lead
Feb 2019	ABP news - Cvoter	60%	32%	28%

=== Best Alternative to Narendra Modi amongst the Opposition leaders in 2019 Election ===
Date published	Polling agency													can't say	Lead
Date published	Polling agency	Rahul Gandhi	Mamata Banerjee	K. Chandrashekar Rao	P. Chidambaram	Akhilesh Yadav	Arvind Kejriwal	Naveen Patnaik	Sharad Pawar	Mayawati	Nitish Kumar	Sonia Gandhi	Mulayam Singh Yadav	can't say	Lead
Jan 2019	India Today- Karvy	32%	3%	–	3%	3%	–	–	–	7%	–	–	–	12%	34%
Jul 2018	India Today- Karvy	46%	8%	6%	6%	4%	4%	2%	2%	2%	–	–	–	12%	34%
Jan 2018	India Today- Karvy	45%	9%	9%	7%	5%	4%	4%	2%	3%	–	–	–	12%	33%
Jul 2017	India Today- Karvy	21%	4%	6%	4%	–	7%	3%	–	2%	13%	12%	3%	22%	1%
Jan 2017	India Today- Karvy	28%	4%	3%	2%	–	7%	2%	–	3%	13%	9%	3%	24%	4%
Aug 2016	India Today- Karvy	23%	4%	4%	2%	–	12%	3%	–	3%	13%	9%	3%	21%	2%
Feb 2016	India Today- Karvy	32%	2%	5%	–	–	10%	1%	–	3%	8%	15%	2%	15%	17%

== Approval ratings ==
=== Economic performance; compared to previous government ===
Date published	Polling agency			Don't know	Lead
Date published	Polling agency	Better	Worse	Don't know	Lead
Jan 2019	India Today -Karvy	49%	28%	23%	21%
Aug 2018	India Today -Karvy	51%	24%	25%	27%
Jan 2018	India Today -Karvy	56%	21%	23%	34%

=== Issues ===
==== Key Issues ====
Date published	Polling agency	Unemployment	Price rise	Corruption	Farmers' plight
Jan 2019	India today - Karvy	37%	19%	15%	12%

==== Farm distress; Low crop causing farm distress ====
Date published	Polling agency			Don't know	Lead
Date published	Polling agency	Yes	No	Don't know	Lead
Jan 2019	India today - Karvy	65%	25%	10%	40%

==== Jobs; Enough created ====
Date published	Polling agency			Don't know	Lead
Date published	Polling agency	Yes	No	Don't know	Lead
Jan 2019	India today - Karvy	12%	76%	12%	64%

==== Alleged corruption in Rafale deal ====
Date published	Polling agency	Yes	No	Not aware of deal	Can't say
Jan 2019	India today - Karvy	30%	32%	23%	15%

== Statewise opinion polling ==
=== Andhra Pradesh (25) ===
Date published	Polling agency			Lead
Date published	Polling agency	TDP	YSRCP	Lead
6 April 2019	IndiaTV-CNX	7	18	11

Date published	Polling agency					Lead
Date published	Polling agency	TDP	YSRCP	UPA	NDA	Lead

=== Arunachal Pradesh (2) ===
Date published	Polling agency			Lead
Date published	Polling agency	NDA	UPA	Lead

Date published	Polling agency			Others	Lead
Date published	Polling agency	NDA	UPA	Others	Lead

=== Assam (14) ===
Date published	Polling agency				Lead
Date published	Polling agency	NDA	UPA	AIUDF	Lead
6 April 2019	IndiaTV-CNX	5	5	2	–
Mar 2019	Times Now-VMR	8	4	2	4

Date published	Polling agency				Others	Lead
Date published	Polling agency	NDA	UPA	AIUDF	Others	Lead
Mar 2019	Times Now-VMR	37.0%	32.4%	12.8%	14.3%	4.60%

=== Bihar (40) ===
Date published	Polling agency			Lead
Date published	Polling agency	NDA	UPA	Lead
6 April 2019	IndiaTV-CNX	29	11	18
Jan 2019	ABP News - Cvoter	35	5	30
Nov 2018	ABP News- C Voter	34	6	28
Oct 2018	ABP News- CSDS	22	18	4
Oct 2018	ABP News- CSDS	31	9	22

Date published	Polling agency			Others	Lead
Date published	Polling agency	NDA	UPA	Others	Lead

=== Chhattisgarh (11) ===
Date published	Polling agency			Lead
Date published	Polling agency	NDA	UPA	Lead
6 April 2019	India TV - CNX	3	8	5
March 2019	News Nation	5	6	1
Jan 2019	India TV - CNX	5	6	1
Oct 2018	Times Now	8	3	5
Oct 2018	ABP News- CSDS	9	2	7
Oct 2018	Times Now	8	3	5

Date published	Polling agency				Others	Lead
Date published	Polling agency	NDA	UPA	JCC	Others	Lead

=== Goa (2) ===
Date published	Polling agency			Lead
Date published	Polling agency	NDA	UPA	Lead
6 April 2019	India TV - CNX	2	–	2

Date published	Polling agency			Others	Lead
Date published	Polling agency	NDA	UPA	Others	Lead

=== Gujarat (26) ===
Date published	Polling agency			Lead
Date published	Polling agency	NDA	UPA	Lead
6 April 2019	India TV-CNX	24	2	22
March 2019	News Nation	21	5	16

Date published	Polling agency			Others	Lead
Date published	Polling agency	NDA	UPA	Others	Lead

=== Haryana (10) ===
Date published	Polling agency				Lead
Date published	Polling agency	NDA	UPA	INLD	Lead
6 April 2019	India TV - CNX	9	1	–	8
Jan 2019	ABP News - Cvoter	7	3	–	4
Oct 2018	ABP News- CSDS	6	3	1	3

Date published	Polling agency				Others	Lead
Date published	Polling agency	NDA	UPA	INLD	Others	Lead

=== Himachal Pradesh (4) ===
Date published	Polling agency			Lead
Date published	Polling agency	NDA	UPA	Lead

Date published	Polling agency			Others	Lead
Date published	Polling agency	NDA	UPA	Others	Lead

=== Jammu and Kashmir (6) ===
Date published	Polling agency			Lead
Date published	Polling agency	NDA	UPA	Lead
6 April 2019	India TV - CNX	2	4	2
Mar 2019	Times Now	2	4	2

Date published	Polling agency				Others	Lead
Date published	Polling agency	NDA	UPA	JKPDP	Others	Lead

=== Jharkhand (14) ===
Date published	Polling agency			Lead
Date published	Polling agency	NDA	UPA	Lead
9 April 2019	Times Now - VMR	11	3	8
8 April 2019	News Nation	9	5	4
6 April 2019	India TV - CNX	10	4	6
30 March 2019	VDP Associates	7	7	–
5 January 2019	VDP Associates	4	10	6

Date published	Polling agency					Lead
Date published	Polling agency	NDA	UPA	JMM	JVM	Lead

=== Karnataka (28) ===
Date published	Polling agency			Lead
Date published	Polling agency	NDA	UPA	Lead
6 April 2019	India TV - CNX	16	12	4

Date published	Polling agency			Others	Lead
Date published	Polling agency	NDA	UPA	Others	Lead

=== Kerala (20) ===
Date published	Polling agency				Lead
Date published	Polling agency	UDF	LDF	NDA	Lead
15–19 April 2019	Twenty Four News	10-12	8-10	0-2	0-4
14 April 2019	Asianet News - AZ Research	13	6	1	7
8 April 2019	Mathrubhoomi News - Nielson	14	5	1	9
6 April 2019	India TV - CNX	14	5	1	9
March 2019	News Nation	15	4	1	11
March 2019	Times Now-VMR	16	3	1	12
Oct 2018	ABP News- CSDS	12	6	2	6

Date published	Polling agency				Lead
Date published	Polling agency	UDF	LDF	NDA	Lead
15-19 Apr 2019	Twenty Four News	42%	39%	15%	3%
14 April 2019	Asianet News – AZ Research	41%	34%	19%	7%
8 April 2019	Mathrubhoomi News – Nielson	41%	37%	16%	4%
Mar 2019	Times Now-VMR	45%	29.2%	21.7%	15.8%

=== Madhya Pradesh (29) ===
Date published	Polling agency			Lead
Date published	Polling agency	NDA	UPA	Lead
6 April 2019	IndiaTV-CNX	21	8	13
Mar 2019	Times Now-VMR	24	5	19
Jan 2019	ABP News -Cvoter	23	6	17
Jan 2019	India TV - CNX	18	11	7
Nov 2018	ABP News - C Voters	22	7	15
Oct 2018	Times Now	21	8	13
Oct 2018	ABP News- CSDS	23	6	17

Date published	Polling agency			Others	Lead
Date published	Polling agency	NDA	UPA	Others	Lead
Mar 2019	Times Now-VMR	49.20%	39.70%	4.30%	9.5%

=== Maharashtra (48) ===
Date published	Polling agency					Lead
Date published	Polling agency	NDA	SHS	UPA	NCP	Lead
6 April 2019	India TV - CNX	34		13		21
Jan 2019	ABP News - Cvoter	28		20		8
Jan 2019	VDP Associates	23	2	23		–
Jan 2019	India TV - CNX	22	8	18		4
Nov 2018	ABP News- C Voter	23	5	14	6	9
Oct 2018	ABP News- CSDS	16	2	30		14
Oct 2018	ABP News- CSDS	36		12		24
Oct 2018	ABP News- CSDS	22	7	11	8	11

Date published	Polling agency					Lead
Date published	Polling agency	NDA	SHS	UPA	NCP	Lead

=== Manipur (2) ===
Date published	Polling agency				Lead
Date published	Polling agency	UPA	NDA	NPF	Lead
Mar 2019	Times Now	1	1	0	–

=== Mizoram (1) ===
Date published	Polling agency				Lead
Date published	Polling agency	UPA	MNF	NDA	Lead
Mar 2019	Times Now	0	1		1

=== Nagaland (1) ===
Date published	Polling agency				Lead
Date published	Polling agency	UPA	NPF	NDA	Lead
March 2019	Times Now-VMR	0	1	0	1

Date published	Polling agency				Lead
Date published	Polling agency	UPA	NPF	Others	Lead
Mar 2019	Times Now-VMR	30.1%	68.7%	5.9%	38.6%

=== Odisha (21) ===
Date published	Polling agency				Lead
Date published	Polling agency	NDA	UPA	BJD	Lead
6 April 2019	India TV - CNX	6	1	14	8
Jan 2019	ABP News - Cvoter	12	–	9	3
Nov 2018	ABP News- C Voter	13	3	5	6
Oct 2018	ABP News- CSDS	13	2	6	7

Date published	Polling agency				Lead
Date published	Polling agency	NDA	UPA	BJD	Lead

=== Punjab (13) ===
Date published	Polling agency				Lead
Date published	Polling agency	NDA	UPA	AAP	Lead
6 April 2019	India TV	3	9	1	6
Mar 2019	Zee 24 Taas	1	10	2	6
Mar 2019	India TV	3	9	1	6
Jan 2019	ABP News - Cvoter	1	12	0	11
Oct 2018	ABP News- CSDS	1	12	0	11

Date published	Polling agency				Lead
Date published	Polling agency	NDA	UPA	AAP	Lead

=== Rajasthan (25) ===
Date published	Polling agency			Lead
Date published	Polling agency	NDA	UPA	Lead
6 April 2019	India TV - CNX	17	8	9
March 2019	News Nation	17	8	9
Jan 2019	India TV - CNX	15	10	5
Jan 2019	VDP Associates	12	13	1
Nov 2018	ABP News- C Voters	17	8	9
Oct 2018	Times Now	24	1	23
Oct 2018	ABP News- CSDS	18	7	11

Date published	Polling agency			Others	Lead
Date published	Polling agency	NDA	UPA	Others	Lead

=== Sikkim (1) ===
Date published	Polling agency				Lead
Date published	Polling agency	UPA	SDF	NDA	Lead
8 April 2019	News X	0	1		1
6 April 2019	India TV - CNX	0	1		1
March 2019	Times Now	0	1		1

=== Tamil Nadu (39) ===
Date published	Polling agency				Lead
Date published	Polling agency	UPA	NDA	AIADMK	Lead
8 April 2019	Times Now-VMR	33	6		27
8 April 2019	PuthiyaThalaimurai TV	31-33	6-8		27
6 April 2019	IndiaTV-CNX	21	13		8
5 April 2019	People studies-Loyola College	33	3-5		28
Mar 2019	News Nation	24	15		9
Mar 2019	Times	18	15	6	3
Mar 2019	India TV-CNX	22	15	2	7

- AIADMK is part of NDA alliance in Tamil Nadu.

=== Telangana (17) ===
Date published	Polling agency					Lead
Date published	Polling agency	TRS	UPA	BJP	AIMIM	Lead
6 April 2019	India TV - CNX	12	4	0	1	8
Mar 2019	Times Now-VMR	12	1	2	1	10

Date published	Polling agency					Lead
Date published	Polling agency	UPA	TRS	AIMIM	NDA	Lead
Mar 2019	Times Now-VMR	30.30%	41.20%	7.4%	17.60%	10.9%

=== Tripura (2) ===
Date published	Polling agency				Lead
Date published	Polling agency	LDF	NDA	UPA	Lead
Mar 2019	Times Now-VMR	0	2	0	2
March 2019	India TV-CNX	1	1	0	–
Jan 2019	Times Now-VMR	0	2	0	2
Dec 2018	India Today	1	1	0	–

=== Uttar Pradesh (80) ===
Date published	Polling agency				Lead
Date published	Polling agency	NDA	UPA	MGB	Lead
8 April 2019	News Nation	37	2	41	4
6 April 2019	India TV - CNX	41	4	35	6
3 April 2019	ABP News - Nielsen	36	2	42	6
1 April 2019	India TV - CNX	46	4	30	16
19 March 2019	Times Now - VMR	42	2	36	6
12 March 2019	News Nation	35	2	43	8
8 March 2019	India TV - CNX	41	4	35	6
31 January 2019	Times Now - VMR	27	2	51	24
24 January 2019	ABP News - Cvoter	25	4	51	26
23 January 2019	India Today	18	4	58	40
2 November 2018	ABP News - CVoter	31	5	44	13
5 October 2018	ABP News- CSDS	36	2	42	6

Date published	Polling agency				Lead
Date published	Polling agency	NDA	UPA	MGB	Lead

=== Uttarakhand (5) ===
Date published	Polling agency			Lead
Date published	Polling agency	NDA	UPA	Lead
Jan 2019	India TV - CNX	4	1	3

Date published	Polling agency			Others	Lead
Date published	Polling agency	NDA	UPA	Others	Lead

=== West Bengal (42) ===
Date published	Polling agency					Lead
Date published	Polling agency	NDA	UPA	AITC	LF	Lead
6 April 2019	India TV - CNX	12	1	28	1	16
Mar 2019	ABP News- Nielsen	8	3	31	–	23
Jan 2019	Spick Media	8	4	30	0	22
Nov 2018	Spick Media	5	4	32	1	27
Nov 2018	ABP News- C Voter	9	1	32	–	23

Date published	Polling agency					Lead
Date published	Polling agency	NDA	UPA	AITC	LF	Lead

== Union territories ==
=== Andaman and Nicobar Islands (1) ===
Date published	Polling agency			Lead
Date published	Polling agency	NDA	UPA	Lead

Date published	Polling agency			Others	Lead
Date published	Polling agency	NDA	UPA	Others	Lead

=== Chandigarh (1) ===
Date published	Polling agency				Lead
Date published	Polling agency	NDA	UPA	AAP	Lead

Date published	Polling agency				Others	Lead
Date published	Polling agency	NDA	UPA	AAP	Others	Lead

=== Dadra and Nagar Haveli (1) ===
Date published	Polling agency			Lead
Date published	Polling agency	NDA	UPA	Lead

Date published	Polling agency			Others	Lead
Date published	Polling agency	NDA	UPA	Others	Lead

=== Lakshadweep (1) ===
Date published	Polling agency			Lead
Date published	Polling agency	UPA	NDA	Lead

Date published	Polling agency				Lead
Date published	Polling agency	UPA	NDA	NCP	Lead

=== Puducherry (1) ===
Date published	Polling agency			Lead
Date published	Polling agency	UPA	NDA	Lead

Date published	Polling agency			Others	Lead
Date published	Polling agency	UPA	NDA	Others	Lead

=== NCT of Delhi (7) ===
Date published	Polling agency				Lead
Date published	Polling agency	NDA	UPA	AAP	Lead
6 April 2019	India TV - CNX	7	0	0	7
March 2019	News Nation	6	0	1	5
Jan 2019	India TV - CNX	5	1	1	4
Oct 2018	ABP News- CSDS	4	–	3	1

== Exit polls ==
Poll type	Date published	Polling agency			Others	Majority	Ref
Poll type	Date published	Polling agency	NDA	UPA	Others	Majority	Ref
Exit polls		India Today-Axis	352 ± 13	93 ± 15	82 ± 13	70 ± 13	
Exit polls		News24-Today's Chanakya	350 ± 14	95 ± 9	97 ± 11	68 ± 14	
Exit polls		News18-IPSOS; CNN-IBN-IPSOS	336	82	124	64	
Exit polls		VDP Associates	333	115	94	61	
Exit polls		Sudarshan News	313	121	109	41	
Exit polls		Times Now-VMR	306 ± 3	132 ± 3	104 ± 3	34 ± 3	
Exit polls		Suvarna News	305	124	102	33	
Exit polls		India TV-CNX	300 ± 10	120 ± 5	122 ± 6	28 ± 10	
Exit polls		India News-Polstrat	287	128	127	15	
Exit polls		CVoter	287	128	127	15	
Exit polls		News Nation	286	122	134	14	
Exit polls		ABP-CSDS	277	130	135	5	
Exit polls		NewsX-Neta	242	164	137	Hung	

== See also ==
- Opinion polling for the 2014 Indian general election
