= Victoria Gowri =

Indian judge

The Honourable Justice Victoria Gowri

Judge of the Madras High Court
- Incumbent
- Assumed office 07 February 2023
- Nominated by: Justice D. Y. Chandrachud
- Appointed by: Droupadi Murmu

Personal details
- Born: 21 May 1973 (age 53) Kanyakumari District, Tamil Nadu
- Spouse: T.Thulasi Muthu Ram
- Parents: R. Lekshmana Chandra (father); Sarojini Chandra (mother)

Lekshmana Chandra Victoria Gowri is an Additional Judge of the Madras High Court. Prior to her appointment, she was a politician from the Bharatiya Janata Party. Her selection engendered controversy after lawyers alleged her to have given hate speeches against religious minorities and unsuccessfully petitioned the Supreme Court of India to withdraw the appointment.

== Education ==
Gowri received her Bachelor of Laws from Government Law College, Madurai and did her postgraduation from Mother Teresa Women's University.

== Career ==
=== Politics ===
Gowri's family has been associated with the Bharatiya Janata Party (BJP) since decades. She has been associated with Seva Bharati — an affiliate of the Sangh Parivar— since her college days. In October 2010, Gowri was appointed to head the party's Women's Wing in Kerala. In 2016, she was appointed as the National Secretary of the women’s wing. The Print reports that Gowri's social media profile has photographs of her tying rakhi on Narendra Modi and other senior BJP leaders; during the 2019 Indian general election, she took part in the Main Bhi Chowkidar campaign.

=== Law ===
Gowri started practice in 1995 and opened her own firm, two years hence. In 2015, the union government—led by BJP—appointed her as their senior standing counsel at the Madras High Court; five years later, she was recruited as an assistant solicitor general for the union government.

==== Elevation to High Court ====
On 17 January 2023, the Collegium of the Supreme Court of India headed by Chief Justice D.Y. Chandrachud recommended her elevation as a judge of the Madras High Court. Her nomination caused controversy due to her evident bias against minority communities. In a 2018 YouTube interview titled "More Threat to National Security & Peace? Jihad or Christian Missionary?", Gowri explicitly claimed that "Christian groups are more dangerous than Islamic groups" and stated that, like Islam is green terror, Christianity is white terror. She alleged that the Christians had become a majority in the Kanyakumari district, despite official government data showing that Hindus were the largest group. A group of 21 senior lawyers of the Madras High Court petitioned the President of India and the Supreme Court against her appointment on grounds of her public remarks and articles targeting Muslim and Christian minorities, which critics characterized as hate speech. The lawyers argued that her regressive views and religious bigotry made her unfit to uphold constitutional values and secularism.

On 6 February 2023, the Chief Justice of India — who heads the Collegium — constituted a two-judge bench to decide on the issue about a week later; in oral remarks, he appeared to accept an ignorance of Gowri's speeches. However, minutes after the decision, the Government accepted the Collegium's recommendation, and the Chief Justice of Madras High Court requested her to take oath, the next day. The hearing was rescheduled and held before a bench of Bhushan Ramkrishna Gavai and Sanjay Kishan Kaul on the morning of 7 January; they dismissed the case upon an oral hearing, refusing to challenge the wisdom of the collegium by adjudicating the "suitability" of a judge.

Gowri was sworn in simultaneous to the hearings, and she took oath before the arguments had concluded in the Supreme Court; the proceedings would have been effectively infructuous even in case of an unfavorable verdict. (Note: Judges, once holding office, can only be removed by impeachment through the Parliament of India.) The Hindu, in its editorial, remarked that Gowri's elevation — notwithstanding an "unabashed prejudice against minorities" — highlighted the unsuitability of the closed-door collegium system to select judges in the face of political pressure.

== Personal life ==
Gowri is married, and has two daughters.
