= Bharatiya Janata Party campaign for the 2014 Indian general election =

Political campaign

- Affiliation: Bharatiya Janata Party
- Status: Prime Ministerial candidate : 13 September 2013; Head of poll campaign : 10 June 2013
- Key people: Narendra Modi (Prime Ministerial Candidate); Rajnath Singh (Party President); Murli Manohar Joshi (Manifesto Committee); Nitin Gadkari (Vision Document)
- Slogans: Ek Bharat, Shreshtha Bharat ("United India, Great India"); Sabka Saath, Sabka Vikas; Achhe din aane waale hain!
- Chants: Jan–Jan Modi, Ghar-Ghar Modi; Abki Baar Modi Sarkar ("Time for Change, Time for Modi.")

Website
- www.bjp.org www.india272.com
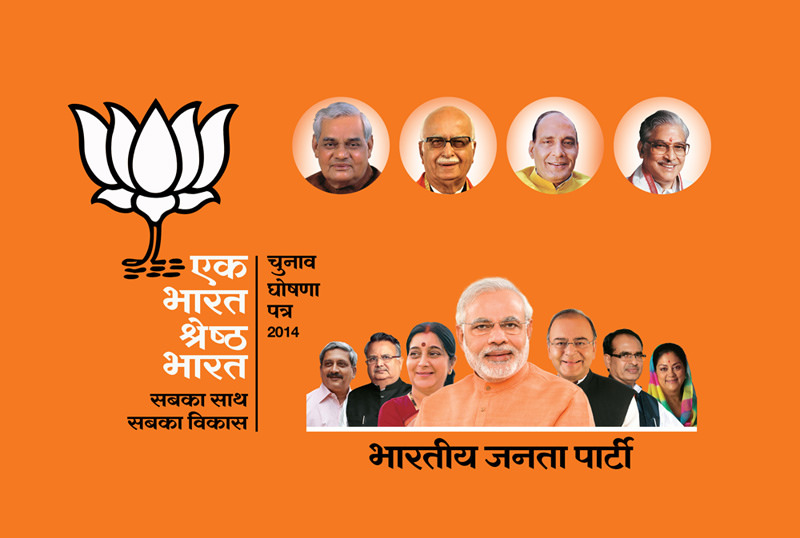

The Bharatiya Janata Party (BJP) is one of the major political parties in India and is the main opposition party during the 15th Lok Sabha. For the 2014 Indian General Election, the BJP contested as the leading party of the National Democratic Alliance (NDA) with Narendra Modi as its prime ministerial candidate. The important issues during the campaign included price hikes, corruption, the economy, national security, basic infrastructure such as roads and railways, and access to basic needs such as electricity and water. The party promised a vibrant and participatory democracy, inclusive and sustainable development, quality of life, productive youth, a globally competitive economy, open and transparent government, and pro-active and pro-people governance in its manifesto.

== Leadership ==
In March 2013, Narendra Modi was appointed to the BJP Parliamentary Board, the party's highest decision-making body, and was chosen to be chairman of the party's Central Election Campaign Committee. On 10 June 2013, Modi was selected to head the poll campaign for the elections at the national level executive meeting of BJP in Goa. The party's senior leader L.K. Advani resigned from all his posts at the party following the selection. However, Advani withdrew his resignation the next day at the urging of RSS chief Mohan Bhagwat. On 19 July 2013, a 12-member committee, headed by Modi and under the guidance of former prime minister Atal Bihari Vajpayee, Rajnath Singh and Advani was appointed at the Goa conclave which included Murli Manohar Joshi, M. Venkaiah Naidu, Nitin Gadkari, Sushma Swaraj, Arun Jaitley, Ananth Kumar, Thawar Chand Gehlot, Ram Lal, Madhya Pradesh Chief Minister Shivraj Singh Chouhan, Chhattisgarh Chief Minister Raman Singh and Goa Chief Minister Manohar Parrikar. Further sub-committees were made headed by senior party leaders. In September 2013, BJP announced Modi as their prime ministerial candidate for the 2014 Lok Sabha polls.

A fortnight after he was anointed as BJP's prime ministerial candidate, Narendra Modi on Sunday relinquished the post of election campaign committee chief to which party president Rajnath Singh was appointed.

== Background ==
The 15th Lok Sabha was due to complete its constitutional term on 31 May 2014. Hence the general election was declared by the Election Commission for the constitution of 16th Lok Sabha in India. The election were held in nine phases from 7 April to 12 May 2014. Following its consecutive defeat in the 2004 and 2009 general elections, BJP had been the principal opposition party in parliament and claimed to secure largest number of parliamentary seats under the leadership of its prime ministerial candidate Narendra Modi who had been gaining ground for a national role after his continued term of 14 years as Gujarat Chief Minister.

BJP won an absolute majority in the 2014 elections with 282 seats making it the first time ever in the 67-year history of independent India that a non-Congress party achieved a simple majority on its own.

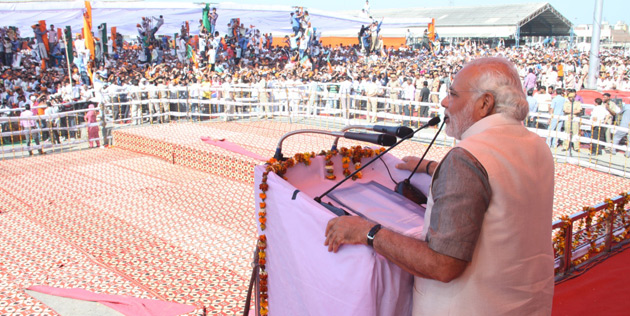
Narendra Modi addressing a Bharat Vijay Rally in Kurukshetra in Haryana

== Expansion of Alliance ==
Following the declaration of Modi as the head of the BJP's election campaign, Janata Dal (United) which had been a key ally of NDA for 17 years had walked out of the coalition as it feared Modi's elevation would wean away its Muslim voters. The parties in and supporting the NDA are listed below with the number of parliamentary constituencies being contested by them :

Party	Base State	Seats Contesting
Bharatiya Janata Party	National Party	428
Shiv Sena	Maharashtra	20
Swabhimani Paksha	Maharashtra	2
Republican Party of India (Athvale)	Maharashtra	1
Rashtriya Samaj Paksha	Maharashtra	1
Desiya Murpokku Dravida Kazhagam	Tamil Nadu	14
Pattali Makkal Katchi	Tamil Nadu	8
Marumalarchi Dravida Munnetra Kazhagam	Tamil Nadu	7
Kongunadu Makkal Desia Katchi	Tamil Nadu	1
Indhiya Jananayaga Katchi	Tamil Nadu	1
All India N.R. Congress	Puducherry	1
Telugu Desam Party	Andhra Pradesh	30
Jana Sena Party	Andhra Pradesh	0
Lok Janshakti Party	Bihar	7
Rashtriya Lok Samata Party	Bihar	3
Kerala Congress (Nationalist)	Kerala	1
Revolutionary Socialist Party (Bolshevik)	Kerala	1
Shiromani Akali Dal	Punjab	10
Haryana Janhit Congress	Haryana	2
Apna Dal	Uttar Pradesh	2
National People's Party (India)	Meghalaya	1
Naga People's Front	Nagaland	1
United Democratic Front	Mizoram	1
Manipur Peoples Party	Manipur	0
Gorkha Janmukti Morcha	West Bengal	0
Maharashtrawadi Gomantak Party	Goa	0
New Justice Party	Tamil Nadu	*
North-East Regional Political Front	North East	#
National Democratic Alliance – Total	India	543
* New Justice Party President Contesting in one seat as BJP Candidate in Lotus Symbol
# North-East Regional Political Front Members NPP, NPF and MNF are contesting in each Seats & Other 8 Members supporting NDA Candidates

In Varanasi, Modi also received support from the newly founded Bharatiya Awam Party, which aims to represents Muslim women.

== Results ==
=== Bharatiya Janata Party ===
State	Total Seats	Seats Won	Seat Change
Andaman & Nicobar Islands (UT)	1	1	Steady
Andhra Pradesh	25	2	▲2
Arunachal Pradesh	2	1	▲1
Assam	14	7	▲3
Bihar	40	22	▲10
Chandigarh (UT)	1	1	▲1
Chhattisgarh	11	10	Steady
Dadra & Nagar Haveli (UT)	1	1	Steady
Daman & Diu (UT)	1	1	Steady
Goa	2	2	▲1
Gujarat	26	26	▲11
Haryana	10	7	▲7
Himachal Pradesh	4	4	▲1
Jammu & Kashmir	6	3	▲3
Jharkhand	14	12	▲4
Karnataka	28	17	▼2
Kerala	20	0	Steady
Lakshadweep (UT)	1	0	Steady
Madhya Pradesh	29	27	▲11
Maharashtra	48	23	▲14
Manipur	2	0	Steady
Meghalaya	2	0	Steady
Mizoram	1	0	Steady
Nagaland	1	0	Steady
NCT of Delhi	7	7	▲7
Orissa	21	1	▲1
Puducherry (UT)	1	0	Steady
Punjab	13	2	▲1
Rajasthan	25	25	▲21
Sikkim	1	0	Steady
Tamil Nadu	39	1	▲1
Telangana	17	1	▲1
Tripura	2	0	Steady
Uttar Pradesh	80	71	▲61
Uttarakhand	5	5	▲1
West Bengal	42	2	▲1
Total	543	282	▲166

== Issues ==
=== Corruption ===
Corruption is widespread in India. India is ranked 95 out of a 179 countries in Transparency International's Corruption Perceptions Index, but its score has improved consistently from 2.7 in 2002 to 3.1 in 2011. In India, corruption takes the form of bribes, tax evasion, exchange controls, embezzlement, etc. Since the last general election in 2009, the 2011 Indian anti-corruption movement by Anna Hazare, and other similar moves by Baba Ramdev, have gathered momentum and political interest. The anti-corruption movement activist Anna Hazare began a hunger strike at the Jantar Mantar in New Delhi in August 2011 with the chief legislative aim to alleviate corruption in the Indian government through introduction of the Jan Lokpal Bill. Another aim, spearheaded by Ramdev, was the repatriation of black money from Swiss and other foreign banks.

=== Economy ===
Since 1991, when India undertook a series of reforms in the face of a balance-of-payments crisis, the nation has been governed by a broad agreement about its economy. Starting in 2012, India entered a period of more anaemic growth, with growth slowing down to 4.4%. Other economic problems also became apparent: a plunging Indian rupee, a persistent high current account deficit and slow industrial growth. Hit by the US Federal Reserve's decision to taper quantitative easing, foreign investors had been rapidly pulling out money from India though this has now reversed with the Stock market at near all-time high and the current account deficit narrowing substantially. Bloomberg highlighted India's slowing economy amidst a record high current account deficit and a falling rupee in summer 2013. It pointed out to a lack of infrastructure investment and a government increasingly likely to give subsidies the national finances cannot afford just before the election. Other points it mentioned were stagnant policymaking and an inefficient bureaucracy. The economy was the main issue in the campaign. The lack of a clear mandate as a result of the election could lead to an increase in the price of gold in the country.

=== Inflation ===
Inflation remains stubbornly high at 7.55% as of August 2012, the highest amotrade (counting exports and imports) stands at $606.7 billion and is currently the 9th largest in the world.

== Manifesto ==
A manifesto committee was constituted by the party to frame a manifesto for the general election. It was led by Murli Manohar Joshi and MP Jaswant Singh, MP Yashwant Sinha, former Himachal Pradesh Chief Minister Prem Kumar Dhumal, Sushil Kumar Modi, Shahnawaz Hussain and others as the members of the committee. On 7 April 2014, the day when the first phase of the Lok Sabha polls began, BJP unveiled its election manifesto. The manifesto covered a wide range of issues ranging from economic growth to social sector problems. The manifesto focused on improving the country's economy and infrastructure, ending policy paralysis and curbing widespread corruption. The manifesto sought to achieve following aims :

- Price rise: Manifesto proposed to lower inflation by taking steps such as, special Courts to stop hoarding and black marketing, setting up a Price Stabilization Fund, evolving a single 'National Agriculture Market, leveraging on technology to disseminate real time data, area specific crops and vegetables linked to food habits of the people.
- Corruption: The BJP said that to eliminate the scope of corruption, it will emphasise on technology enabled e-Governance. Apart from that public awareness, policy-driven governance and simplification of the tax regime have also been cited as solutions to the problem of corruption.
- E-Governance: There was a special mention of e-governance and IT as an enabler of empowerment. The manifesto said that BJP will focus on increasing the penetration and usage of broadband across the country, leverage technology for e-Governance, generate IT based jobs in rural and semi-urban areas, use mobile and e-Banking to ensure financial inclusion.
- Open Government and Accountable Administration: The manifesto said that Administrative reforms will be a priority for the BJP if it comes to power in the elections. The measures will include digitisation of government records, opening up government to draw expertise from the industry, academia and society into the services. BJP also emphasised that the hallmarks of its governance model would be People-centric, Policy driven, Time bound delivery, Minimum Government, Maximum Governance.

The manifesto reiterated BJP's stand to explore all possibilities within the framework of the Constitution to facilitate the construction of the Ram Temple in Ayodhya. Touching the other contentious issues like abrogation of Art 370 giving special status to Jammu & Kashmir and enactment of Uniform Civil Code were included in the manifesto. The manifesto gave high priority to revival of growth and job creation, but remained silent on the number of jobs to be created. It said no to FDI in multi-brand retail but said that FDI will be allowed in sectors wherever needed for job and asset creation, infrastructure and acquisition of niche technology and specialised expertise. The party promised to set up a Price Stabilisation Fund to check inflation, ensure fiscal discipline and pursue banking sector reforms to deal with the problem of rising bad loans. The manifesto said that a dedicated fund will be created for integrated development of Himalayan region. BJP promised to bring all states on board to implement GST. The manifesto promised launch of Diamond Quadrilateral project of high speed train network and it sought to develop freight and industrial corridors and boost development of coastal areas through 'Sagar Mala project.

== Rallies ==
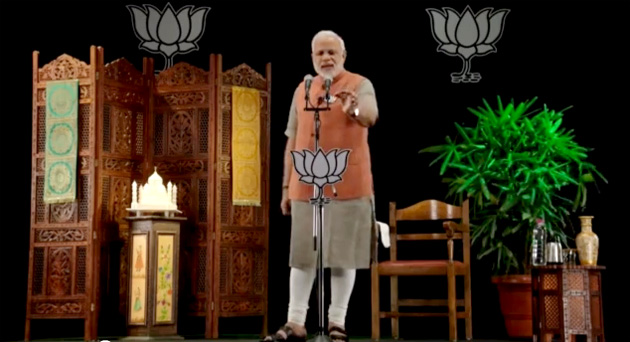
Narendra Modi addressing a 3D rally during 2014 Indian general elections.

The BJP tried to redefine the idea of election rallies by pitching in experts from event management companies, advertisement firms and using technology for maximum impact. Rallies were organised like corporate events with the party employing all the tools to reach out to voters. Beginning on 26 March, Narendra Modi planned to address 185 'Bharat Vijay' rallies across the country covering a total of 295 constituencies. As well as the prime ministerial candidate for the BJP, party president Rajnath Singh also expected to address about 155 to 160 election rallies in various constituencies. Senior leaders of the party L. K. Advani, Sushma Swaraj, Arun Jaitley and Murli Manohar Joshi and Chief Ministers of Madhya Pradesh, Chhattisgarh, Rajasthan and Goa also campaigned in many constituencies.

== Parliamentary candidates ==
The BJP fielded as many as 427 candidates and a total of 543 candidates including the parties in NDA. The prime ministerial candidate Narendra Modi's candidature was fielded from Varanasi, Uttar Pradesh. At the same time, Modi will also be fielded from Vadodara in his home region of Gujarat. L. K. Advani was given the Gandhinagar seat from Gujarat. BJP president Rajnath Singh shifted to Lucknow away from home constituency of Ghaziabad. Arun Jaitley, who is contesting for the Lok Sabha seat for the first time, is fielded from Amritsar. Party leader Sushma Swaraj is contesting from home constituency of Vidisha. Party's vice-president Smriti Irani was fielded from high-profile constituency of Amethi. Nomination of BJP candidate S. Gurumurthy was rejected from Niligiris for failing to submit mandatory forms during his nomination.

== Controversies ==
The move to field Arun Jaitley from Amritsar was controversial as incumbent MP Navjot Singh Sidhu was unhappy with not being allocated the constituency. Yet he said that as Jaitley was his guru and he would accept the decision, but would not run from any other constituency. His wife, BJP MLA from Amritsar East Navjot Kaur, welcomed Jaitley to the city. The reason for not allocating the ticket to Sidhu was said to be because of his spat with the Shiromani Akali Dal, Punjab Chief Minister Parkash Singh Badal and party President Sukhbir Singh Badal, as well as other BJP personnel. Likewise, Jaswant Singh was reported to be seeking a seat from his native Barmer, Rajasthan. He threatened to leave the party and run as an independent. On 21 March, he filed his nomination papers as an independent candidate from Barmer. Instead, former INC members Colonel Sonaram Choudhary became the BJP candidate from the constituency. Rajasthan Chief Minister Vasundhara Raje spoke at his nomination in saying to Singh: "A family is a family and we have to be together. Don't leave the party, please accept what the party does." L. K. Advani was upset at the decision to be fielded from Gandhinagar, the capital of Gujarat, from where he incumbent and instead wanted to run from Bhopal, Madhya Pradesh.

== Chai Pe Charcha ==
Chai Pe Charcha (Hindi phrase for discussion over tea) is campaign organised by the BJP along with the Citizens for Accountable Governance, a political advocacy group founded by election strategist Prashant Kishor. Narendra Modi interacts with people at a tea stall in predetermined places using a combination of satellite, DTH, internet and mobile. The "I Support Narendra Modi" team (consisting of members Vikas Pandey, Vinod Rai, Hitesh Rangra, Devang Dave, Bijesh Dwiwedy, Hardik Upadhyay, Shailesh Jha and Vikki Giridhar) helped to bring a large number of people to Chai Pe Charcha.

List of events

Date	Place	Topic
2014-02-12	Ahmedabad	Good Governance
2014-03-08	Delhi	Women Empowerment
2014-03-20	Yavatmal, Wardha, Maharashtra	Farmers and Agrarian Crisis

== I Support Narendra Modi ==
"I Support Narendra Modi" (ISN) was an Indian social advocacy group supporting Narendra Modi as Prime Minister of India. The movement was founded by members Vikas Pandey, Vinod Rai, Hitesh Rangra, Devang Dave, Bijesh Dwiwedy, Hardik Upadhyay, Shailesh Jha and Vikki Giridhar. ISN used social media tools to mobilize young people during the election and supported initiatives such as blood donation camps and political activism.

The I Support Narendra Modi Facebook fan page was listed among the top 5 pages in the world in the Political category, with 1 crore followers. The success of "Chai Pe Charcha" was largely due to the ISN team.

== See also ==
- Bharatiya Janata Party campaign for the 2019 Indian general election
- Indian National Congress campaign for the 2014 Indian general election
