= Main Bhi Chowkidar =

Hindi slogan used in 2019 Indian general election

Logo for the campaign

Main Bhi Chowkidar (Hindi: मैं भी चौकीदार, transl. "I too am a watchman") is a Hindi slogan used by the Bharatiya Janata Party (BJP) in its campaign for the 2019 Indian general election. The slogan was coined by the BJP's prime ministerial candidate Narendra Modi as a counter-slogan against the Indian National Congress leader Rahul Gandhi. Millions of BJP members changed their DPs (display pictures) and profiles to show their solidarity with Modi.

== History ==
On 14 March 2019, Modi responded to the jibe of Chowkidar Chor Hai coined by Rahul Gandhi by launching a campaign with the slogan "Main Bhi Chowkidar" for his supporters, implying that everyone is a fighter against corruption and social evils. Modi even changed the name of his official Twitter handle titled 'Narendra Modi' to 'Chowkidar Narendra Modi'. The slogan came under considerable ridicule from opposition, who labeled it as a "new drama".

In a coordinated campaign, party leaders of the BJP, including party president Amit Shah, chief ministers and other union ministers changed their Twitter profile names by adding a prefix "Chowkidar". Eventually, lacs of National Democratic Alliance (NDA) supporters also changed their names accordingly. Modi addressed a large group of watchmen on audio link as part of the campaign.

Congress party criticized BJP's election slogan with Rahul Gandhi stating that the truth cannot change since Chowkidar Chor Hai. The chief spokesperson of Congress, Randeep Surjewala, responded to Modi's slogan and accused Modi of being the "only chowkidar who is a thief". Congress social media team responded with the slogan "Main Bhi Berozgar" (I too am jobless) to highlight the problem of unemployment under the Modi government and to counter Main Bhi Chowkidar campaign.

Aam Aadmi Party (AAP) chief Arvind Kejriwal stated that Modi wants the entire country to become chowkidar, people who want their children to become watchmen should vote for Modi while those looking for good education for the children to become doctor, engineer or lawyer should vote for him.

Main Bhi Chowkidar is considered more impactful than Chowkidar Chor Hai campaign.

For 2020 Bihar Elections, Nitish Kumar modelled his campaign Main Bhi Nitish Kumar (I too am Nitish Kumar) after it.

== See also ==
- Bharatiya Janata Party campaign for the 2019 Indian general election
- 2019 Indian general election
- Chowkidar Chor Hai
