= Bharatiya Janata Party campaign for the 2019 Indian general election =

Political campaign

- Campaign: 2019 Indian general election
- PM Candidate: Narendra Modi; Prime Minister of India
- Affiliation: Bharatiya Janata Party
- Status: Prime Ministerial candidate
- Key people: Narendra Modi (Prime Ministerial Candidate); Amit Shah (Party President)

Website
- www.bjp.org
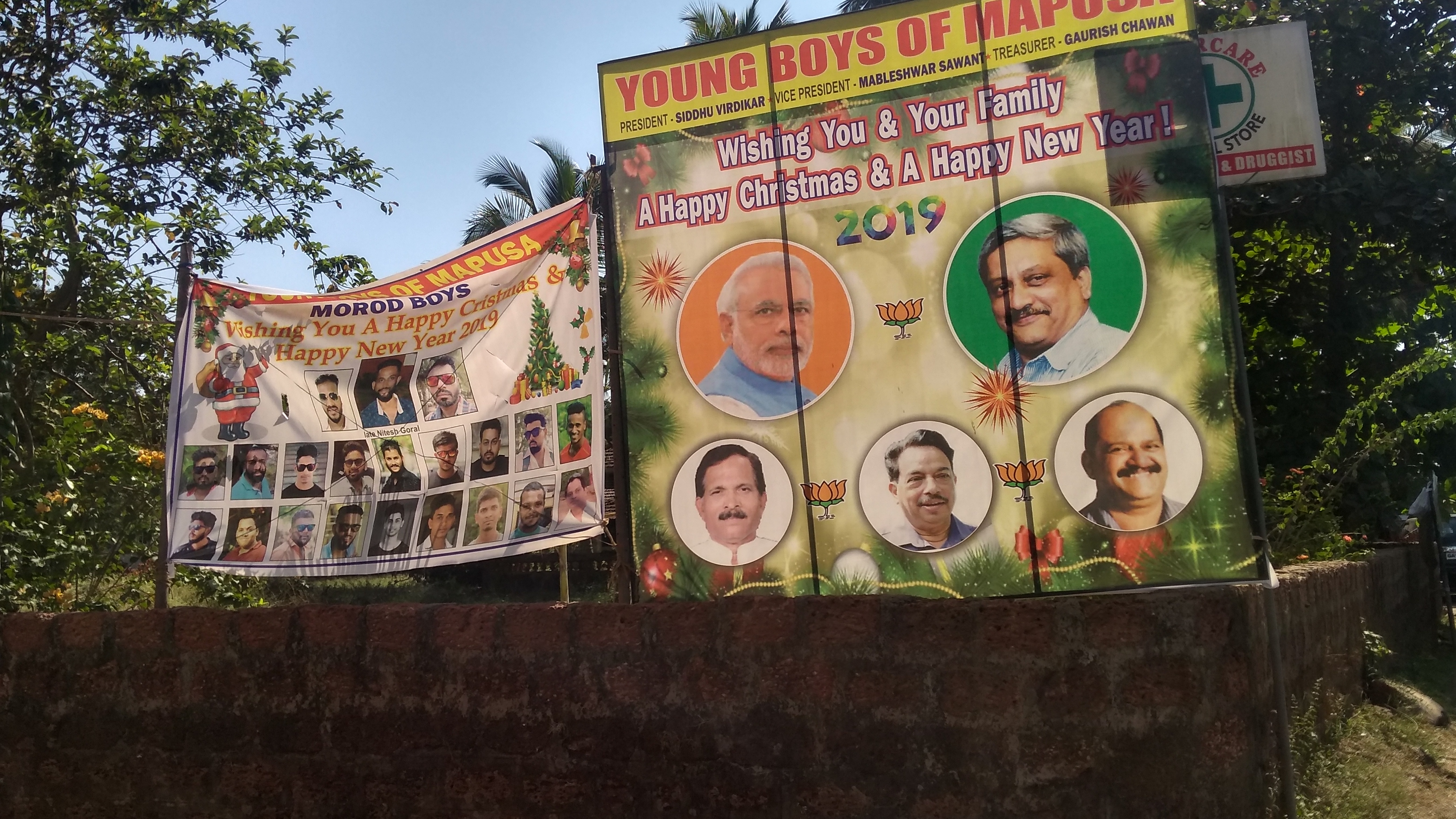

The Bharatiya Janata Party (BJP) is one of India's two largest national political parties and was the ruling party at the time of the 2019 general election, having held power since the 16th Lok Sabha in 2014. It was seeking re-election in the 2019 parliamentary election as the leading party of the National Democratic Alliance, with Narendra Modi as its Prime Ministerial candidate and party president Amit Shah as the campaign chief.

== Background ==
The campaign followed the party's successful 2014 general election campaign, in which the BJP won 282 seats — a clear majority in the 543-seat Lok Sabha.

On 26 December 2018, Party President Amit Shah announced the leadership teams for the BJP's campaign in seventeen states.

The BJP released its manifesto, titled Sankalp Patra, on 8 April 2019.

== Results ==
State	Total Seats	Seats Won	Seat Change
Andaman & Nicobar Islands (UT)	1	0	▼1
Andhra Pradesh	25	0	▼2
Arunachal Pradesh	2	2	▲1
Assam	14	9	▲2
Bihar	40	17	▼5
Chandigarh (UT)	1	1	Steady
Chhattisgarh	11	9	▼1
Dadra & Nagar Haveli (UT)	1	0	▼1
Daman & Diu (UT)	1	1	Steady
Goa	2	1	▼1
Gujarat	26	26	Steady
Haryana	10	10	▲3
Himachal Pradesh	4	4	Steady
Jammu & Kashmir	6	3	Steady
Jharkhand	14	11	▼1
Karnataka	28	25	▲8
Kerala	20	0	Steady
Lakshadweep (UT)	1	0	Steady
Madhya Pradesh	29	28	▲1
Maharashtra	48	23	Steady
Manipur	2	1	▲1
Meghalaya	2	0	Steady
Mizoram	1	0	Steady
Nagaland	1	0	Steady
NCT of Delhi	7	7	Steady
Odisha	21	8	▲8
Puducherry (UT)	1	0	Steady
Punjab	13	2	Steady
Rajasthan	25	24	Steady
Sikkim	1	0	Steady
Tamil Nadu	39	0	▼1
Telangana	17	4	▲3
Tripura	2	2	▲2
Uttar Pradesh	80	62	▼9
Uttarakhand	5	5	Steady
West Bengal	42	18	▲16
Total	543	303	▲21

== Main Bhi Chowkidar ==
Modi responded to Rahul Gandhi's Chowkidar Chor Hai jibe by launching a campaign with the slogan "Main bhi chowkidar" (Hindi: मैं भी चोकीदार।, transl. "I too am a watchman") for his supporters, implying that everyone is a fighter against corruption and social evils. Modi also changed his official Twitter account name from 'Narendra Modi' to 'Chowkidar Narendra Modi'.

In a coordinated campaign, ministers, party president Amit Shah and other BJP leaders such as Piyush Goyal changed their Twitter profile names by adding a prefix "Chowkidar". Many supporters of BJP also changed their names accordingly. Modi addressed a large group of watchmen on audio link as part of the campaign.

== Leadership ==
BJP's president during the election campaign was Amit Shah.

== Alliance ==
The BJP contested the 2019 election as the leading party of the National Democratic Alliance (NDA), a coalition that included parties such as the Janata Dal (United), Lok Jan Shakti Party, Shiromani Akali Dal, and Shiv Sena, among others.

== Issues ==
=== Ram temple ===
The BJP supports the building of a Ram temple on the disputed land in Ayodhya, Uttar Pradesh. The BJP campaigned prominently on the Ram temple issue during the election. Prime Minister Narendra Modi and Uttar Pradesh Chief Minister Yogi Adityanath both advocated for the construction of the Ram temple, seeking to consolidate the Hindu vote.

== Manifesto ==
The BJP constituted the manifesto committee on 6 January 2019, to be chaired by Rajnath Singh. Fifteen sub-committees were planned to be formed under the main committee to draft the manifesto. Other key members of the committee were Arun Jaitley, Ravi Shankar Prasad, Nirmala Sitharaman, Thawar Chand Gehlot, Piyush Goyal, Mukhtar Abbas Naqvi, Shivraj Singh Chouhan, Sushil Modi, Keshav Prasad Maurya and Meenakshi Lekhi. The inputs for the manifesto were gathered through crowd-sourcing, wherein around 7,500 suggestion boxes were placed in 4,000 assembly constituencies and transported in 300 buses or raths.

=== Jammu and Kashmir ===
In April 2019, the BJP announced that, if re-elected, it would revoke Jammu and Kashmir's special constitutional status under Article 370, which granted the state significant legislative autonomy, including restrictions on non-residents acquiring property there.
