= Chowkidar Chor Hai =

Hindi slogan used by the Indian National Congress (INC)

Chowkidar Chor Hai (Hindi: चौकीदार चोर है, lit. 'The watchman is a thief') was a Hindi slogan used by the Indian National Congress (INC) in its election campaign for the 2019 Indian general election. The slogan was coined by the then INC president, Rahul Gandhi, against the ruling Bharatiya Janata Party (BJP) affiliated sitting Prime Minister Narendra Modi, after raising allegations of favouritism and price escalation in the Dassault Rafale deal. The slogan was coined with the intention of conveying that the person who was entrusted with safeguarding public money (i.e. the watchman) was in fact a thief; context being that PM Modi had in past claimed to be a "chowkidar" (Watchman in English) of the country.

== Background ==
Narendra Modi has often referred to himself as a "chowkidar" (watchman), implying that he would not allow any corruption in the country. While campaigning for the 2014 Indian general election, Modi in his speeches had promised that he would serve the country, not as a prime minister, but as a watchman. Modi further added that as a watchman he would never allow anyone to put their paws on the public money. Rahul Gandhi had referred to Modi as chowkidar during his campaign for the 2017 Gujarat Legislative Assembly election.

== Slogan ==
The slogan "Chowkidar Chor Hai" was coined by Gandhi as a jibe against Modi while campaigning for 2018 Rajasthan Legislative Assembly election. The Hindi slogan translates to "the watchman is a thief." It was aimed at Modi in relation to the alleged irregularities and favouritism in awarding of the contracts related to the Rafale fighter jet deal. On 14 December, Gandhi stated that Chowkidar chor hai and his party will prove the corruption that was done in the Rafale deal. The government has denied any wrongdoing in the Rafale deal and also Supreme Court of India dismissed all the petitions seeking a review of its December 2018 judgement and upheld the Rafale deal, stating that no irregularities or corruption have been found.

Gandhi in one of his rallies compared it with BJP's 2014 Indian general election slogan "Achhe din aane waale hain" (Good days are coming) by stating slogan "Achhe din aayenge" has now changed to "Chowkidar chor hai". Later in Nagpur, Gandhi stated that an enquiry will be done after the election post which, "the Chowkidar will go to jail".

On 20 November Gandhi commented that a "crime thriller" called "Chowkidar hi chor hai" is being played out in Delhi and in its most recent episode, the Central Bureau of Investigation (CBI) Deputy Inspector General of Police (DIG) Manoj Sinha accused senior government officials of corruption in a writing to the Supreme Court, meanwhile his "partner from Gujarat" was amassing enormous wealth. Sinha had stated that government officials and ministers were interfering in the investigation into CBI special director Rakesh Asthana.

On 18 November 2018, during a BJP election rally in Chhindwara, Madhya Pradesh, responding to the repeated chowkidar chor hai slogan against him, Modi stated that the "Naamdaar" (dynast) and the Congress party were hurling abuses at him.

On 24 December 2018, Shiv Sena chief Uddhav Thackeray while speaking at a rally in Maharashtra state's Pandharpur town, repeated the slogan "Chowkidar chor hai". He elaborated the slogan with a story about a farmer whose neem plants were attacked by the pests. This was unusual because Neem tree extracts are traditionally used in India for repelling the pests. Thackeray then stated that "this is what is happening everywhere and even those, tasked with protection, are stealing these days."

On 25 March, the slogan Chowkidar chor hai was raised by the audience during the fourth cricket match of IPL 2019 at Jaipur.

=== Main Bhi Chowkidar ===
On 14 March 2019, Modi responded to the jibe by launching a campaign with the slogan "Main Bhi Chowkidar" (Hindi: मैं भी चोकीदार, lit. 'I too am a watchman') for his supporters, implying that everyone is a fighter against corruption and social evils. Modi even changed the name of his official Twitter handle titled 'Narendra Modi' to 'Chowkidar Narendra Modi'.

In a coordinated campaign, ministers, party president Amit Shah and other BJP leaders such as Piyush Goyal changed their Twitter profile names by adding a prefix "Chowkidar". Many supporters of BJP also changed their names accordingly. Modi addressed a large group of watchmen on audio link as part of the campaign.

Congress party criticized BJP's election slogan with Gandhi claiming the original phrase is too popular to be overtaken. The chief spokesperson of Congress, Randeep Surjewala responded to Modi's slogan and accused Modi of being the "only chowkidar who is a thief". Congress social media team responded with the slogan "Main Bhi Berozgar" (I too am jobless) to highlight the problem of unemployment under the Modi government and to counter Main Bhi Chowkidar campaign.

Aam Aadmi Party (AAP) chief Arvind Kejriwal stated that Modi wants the entire country to become chowkidar, people who want their children to become watchmen should vote for Modi while those looking for good education for the children to become doctor, engineer or lawyer should vote for him.

=== Supreme Court case ===
BJP leader Meenakshi Lekhi filed a case in the Supreme Court of India seeking a contempt action against Gandhi for misattributing his remarks to the top court. On 22 April 2019, Gandhi filed his response to the Supreme Court's notice on his comments on the sub-judice case of the Rafale fighter jet deal, saying he had attributed the chowkidar chor hai remarks to the Supreme Court "in the heat of the campaign". In his reply, Gandhi said he got carried away while campaigning and "unfortunately", the media "mingled" his words. He expressed regret for dragging the top court's name into the comments he made a week ago and also admitted that the Supreme Court had never used the phrase (chowkidar chor hai), which he reiterates at every campaign rally accusing Modi of stealing from the poor and handing doles to the rich. Later he apologised, after the Court expressed displeasure on a "regret", instead of "apology" as was sought earlier.

== Across border impact ==
Sheikh Rasheed Ahmad, the 38th Interior Minister of Pakistan from 2020 to 2022, raised this slogan against the Pakistan Army in the presence of his supporters in Pakistani Punjab when allegedly the army-backed horse trading toppled Imran Khan government in the country.

== See also ==
- Main Bhi Chowkidar
- Who watches the watchmen, a Latin phrase found in the work of the Roman poet Juvenal
