= Aap Ki Adalat =

Courtroom styled Indian talk show

- Genre: Public affairs; Talk show
- Starring: Rajat Sharma
- Country of origin: India
- Original language: Hindi

Production
- Producer: Independent News Service
- Running time: approx. 60 minutes

Original release
- Network: Zee TV; Zee News; India TV
- Release: 1993 – present

Aap Ki Adalat (transl. Your court) is an Indian television show that is hosted by journalist Rajat Sharma. The show began in 1993, was broadcast on the television channel Zee TV until 2004, moved on from Zee News in 2004, and now airs on India TV. It is the longest running reality show in India's television history, and in 2014 celebrated its 21st anniversary at Pragati Maidan in New Delhi.

== Overview ==
The set up of the show resembles a courtroom, where a celebrity is appointed as a judge, and Rajat Sharma, the host, acts as the lawyer. Personalities grilled on the show have ranged from top politicians and Bollywood stars to sportsmen and spiritual gurus, and they have poured out all sorts of emotions – some tried to browbeat, some defended their acts and some shed tears.

In 1994, actor Rajesh Khanna was the guest in the show on its 50th Episode. In 1995, Shiv Sena founder Bal Thackeray was the guest in the show.

A regular weekend feature on India TV, the show has consistently ruled television ratings for more than twenty years. The interview of Narendra Modi just before the 2014 general election broke all rating records, attracting 74 per cent of Hindi news television viewers in India.

Aap Ki Adalat is India's longest-running and by far the strongest running show on Indian television, attracting millions of viewers since 1993. In 2014 India TV celebrated the show's 21st anniversary at Pragati Maidan in New Delhi; participants included President of India Pranab Mukherjee, Prime Minister Narendra Modi, actors, cricketers, other politicians and bureaucrats.

In the show, Sharma has also interviewed Jammu and Kashmir's separatist leader Yasin Malik.
