= Rajat Sharma =

Indian journalist

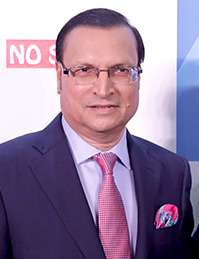
- Rajat Sharma in 2019
- Born: 18 February 1957 (age 69); New Delhi, India
- Education: Shri Ram College of Commerce; University of Delhi
- Occupations: Journalist; Television presenter; Businessperson
- Organization: India TV
- Spouse: Ritu Dhawan (m. 1997)
- Awards: Padma Bhushan (2015)

Rajat Sharma (born 18 February 1957) is an Indian journalist and businessperson acting as the chairman and Editor-in-Chief of India TV, an Indian news channel. He is most known as host of Indian television show Aap Ki Adalat, which first aired in 1993, making it the longest-running reality show in India's television history, In 2015, he was awarded the Padma Bhushan, one of India's highest civilian awards.

== Early life and education ==
Sharma was born 18 February 1957 in Sabzi Mandi, Delhi. He grew up with his six brothers and a sister, and did his schooling from Sanatan Dharm Middle School, Subzi Mandi (1963–71) and Ramjas School, Pusa Road (1971-74). Meanwhile, he became part of the movement led by Jayprakash Narayan, and involved with a small newspaper, 'Mashaal'. Subsequently, in 1975, when the Emergency was declared by then Prime Minister Indira Gandhi, he was arrested and imprisoned in Tihar Jail for 11 months for his activities with the movement. After his release, he pursued his higher education at the Shri Ram College of Commerce (SRCC) and joined Akhil Bharatiya Vidyarthi Parishad (ABVP). In 1977, he was elected the General Secretary of the Delhi University Students Union (DUSU), with Vijay Goel as the Union's President.

== Career ==
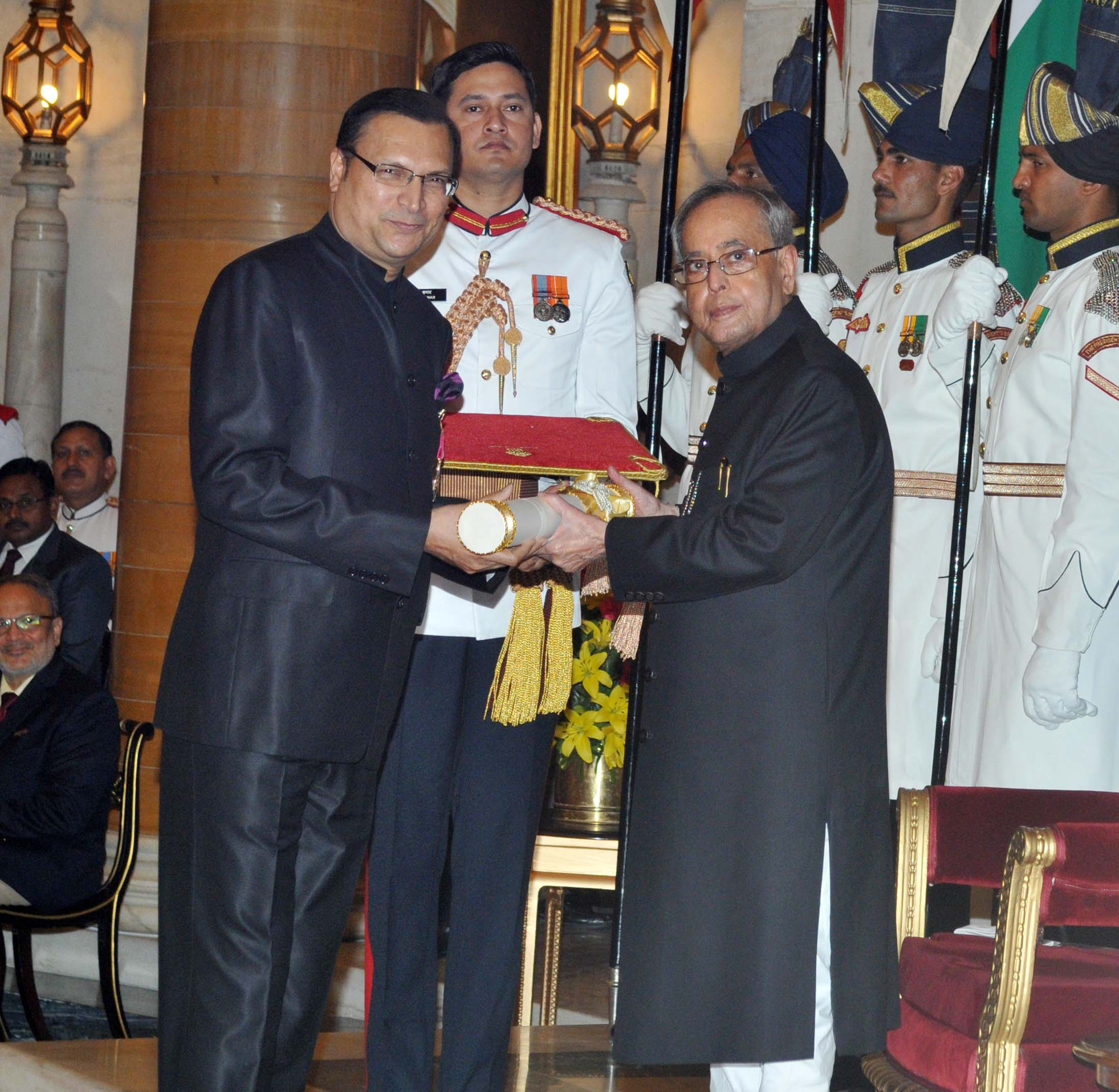
Pranab Mukherjee presenting the Padma Bhushan Award to Rajat Sharma

After completing his M.Com. From SRCC, he started his journalism career as a researcher for veteran political columnist Janardan Thakur in the late 1970s. Soon, he became a reporter with the fortnightly magazine Onlooker, by 1984, he became chief-of-bureau, and its editor 1985 in Mumbai. He went on to become the editor of the newspaper Sunday Observer in 1987 and later remained the editor of The Daily till 1992. In 1993, he started hosting Aap ki Adalat, an interview show in the format of a courtroom (Adalat) on Zee TV. Nearly a decade later he co-founded TV news channel India TV in 2004, along with his wife Ritu Dhawan.

Today he remains the chairman and Editor-in-Chief of India TV, an Indian news outlet. Sharma is said to be very close to the ruling BJP and the late Arun Jaitley, a BJP politician and the Prime Minister Narendra Modi. In 2014, India TV's former anchor Tanu Sharma filed FIR against two India TV executives, including Sharma, alleging that she faced harassment in the workplace leading her to attempt suicide. In response, Sharma and Ritu Dhiman threatened to pursue legal action against her.

In June 2024, Sharma filed a lawsuit against Ravindra Kumar Choudhary, leading the Delhi High Court to restrain Choudhary from using the names “Baap Ki Adalat” and “Jhandiya TV,” which were deemed deceptively similar to Sharma's show “Aap Ki Adalat.” The court ordered that Choudhary must cease using Sharma’s images and name across various platforms.

Sharma has also filed a public interest litigation (PIL) in the Delhi High Court, urging the Ministry of Electronics and Information Technology (MeitY) to identify and block platforms that facilitate deepfake creation, following his own experience with a malicious deepfake video. The court acknowledged the urgency of the issue, indicating that political parties have raised similar concerns. Sharma’s PIL also calls for appointing a government nodal officer to manage deepfake complaints and advocates for clear disclosures of AI-generated content by platforms. He argued that current legislation does not adequately address the challenges posed by deepfakes.

An RTI request filed by the Indian Express revealed that Sharma was not on the government's list of nominees but received the Padma Bhushan award at the recommendation of Arun Jaitley. He was President of the Delhi Cricket Association. However, he resigned only twenty months into his job citing corruption and various "pulls and pressures".

On 9 July 2024, he was unanimously elected as president of the News Broadcasters & Digital Association (NBDA) which is known as the largest organisation of news broadcasters and digital media in India. He replaced the NBDA's previous president, Avinash Pandey.

== Awards ==
- Padma Bhushan (2015) by the Government of India for his contributions through Journalism.

== Defamation suit ==
In June 2024, Rajat Sharma faced allegations from Congress leaders Ragini Nayak, Jairam Ramesh, and Pawan Khera, who claimed that he used abusive language during a live broadcast on the day of the Lok Sabha election results. Following these accusations, Sharma filed a defamation suit in the Delhi High Court, seeking the removal of the tweets and videos in question. The Delhi High Court, after reviewing the case, ruled in favor of Sharma, stating that the continued presence of the alleged defamatory material could irreparably harm his reputation as a journalist. The court ordered the removal of the tweets and directed social media platforms to make the related videos private until the case was resolved. Sharma's legal team contended that the Congress leaders only began tweeting about the allegations six days after the broadcast, suggesting a coordinated effort to damage his reputation.
