= Indian National Congress campaign for the 2014 Indian general election =

Political campaign

- Campaign: 2014 Indian general election
- Affiliation: Indian National Congress
- Alliance: United Progressive Alliance
- Key people: Sonia Gandhi (Party President); Rahul Gandhi (Party Vice-President), (Manifesto Committee); Manmohan Singh (then Prime Minister)
- Slogan: "Kattar Soch Nahi Yuva Josh " Meaning: youthful energy, not hardline views
- Chant: "Main nahin, Hum"; Meaning: Not I, but We
- Chant: "Har Hath Shakti, Har Hath Tarakki"; Meaning: power in every hand, progress to everyone
- Website: www.inc.in

The Indian National Congress (INC) is one of the two major political parties in India. The prominent members of the party are the president Sonia Gandhi, vice-president Rahul Gandhi, former prime minister Manmohan Singh and Priyanka Gandhi. INC took part in the elections alongside other members of the United Progressive Alliance. On the fourth anniversary of the second United Progressive Alliance government, the INC announced that its campaign for the election would be led by Prime minister Manmohan Singh, party chairperson Sonia Gandhi, and general secretary Rahul Gandhi.

Burson-Marsteller, JWT and Dentsu were contracted to provide an image makeover to the party and Rahul Gandhi. In its election manifesto, INC promised "Right to Health", "Right to homestead", "Right to social security" and "Right to pension". During the elections, Congress leaders criticised the Bharatiya Janata Party (BJP) and its prime ministerial candidate Narendra Modi for being involved in low level politics. They accused Modi of favouring businessmen. The party campaigned throughout India, but suffered its worst ever defeat, winning only 44 seats over 543 constituencies; the BJP won the election and was able to form a government with a majority for the first time since the victory of Rajiv Gandhi in 1984. After the results were announced both Sonia and Rahul Gandhi offered to resign from their posts in the party but the Congress Working Committee rejected their resignations and criticised the government's communication strategy for the party's defeat.

== Background ==
As the 15th Lok Sabha was due to complete its constitutional term on 31 May 2014, a general election was called by the Election Commission for the constitution of the 16th Lok Sabha. The election was held in nine phases from 7 April to 12 May 2014. The Congress party had won the previous two elections in 2004 and 2009, and so was campaigning to win the election for the third consecutive time. The result of this election were declared on 16 May, before the 15th Lok Sabha completed its constitutional mandate on 31 May 2014.

"The government and the party have decided while Singh is the PM and Sonia is the Congress chief, Rahul Gandhi has energised the party cadre. So the 2014 elections would be fought under the leadership of the triumvirate."

— Manish Tewari's statement in May 2013

Rahul Gandhi was appointed to head a six-member committee to formulate and implement alliances, the party manifesto, and general publicity for the election. On 19 January 2013, Rahul Gandhi was appointed the vice-president of the Indian National Congress at the Jaipur Declaration of Congress. The resolution to make Rahul the vice-president was moved by A. K. Antony and was unanimously adopted by the Congress Working Committee. Rahul had earlier been the party's general secretary, the chief of Indian Youth Congress, and National Students Union of India. The party decided not to announce a prime ministerial candidate. The members of the party's pre-poll alliance committee were Veerappa Moily, A. K. Antony, Jitendra Singh, and Suresh Pachauri. Ambika Soni, Digvijaya Singh, Jyotiraditya Scindia and Manish Tewari formed the party's publicity group for the elections.

== Candidates ==
The United Progressive Alliance (of which INC is the biggest member) fielded 541 candidates for the Lok Sabha elections; 465 belonged to INC (Note: The Indian National Congress did not field any candidate in Mainpuri and Kannauj.) and the rest were fielded by the other members of the UPA.

Constituents of United Progressive Alliance (Pre-poll Alliance)
#	Party	Alliance in states	Seats sharing	Seats Won		References
1	Indian National Congress	All States and UT	465	44	▼162	
2	Rashtriya Janata Dal	Bihar, Jharkhand	28	4	Steady	
3	Nationalist Congress Party	Bihar, Goa, Gujarat, Maharashtra	23	6	▼3	
4	Rashtriya Lok Dal	Uttar Pradesh	8	0	▼5	
5	Jharkhand Mukti Morcha	Jharkhand	4	2	Steady	
6	Jammu & Kashmir National Conference	Jammu & Kashmir	3	0	▼3	
7	Mahan Dal	Uttar Pradesh	3	0	Steady	
8	Indian Union Muslim League	Kerala	2	2	Steady	
9	Socialist Janata (Democratic)	Kerala	1	0	Steady	
10	Kerala Congress (M)	Kerala	1	1	Steady	
11	Revolutionary Socialist Party	Kerala	1	1	▲1	
12	Bodoland People's Front	Assam	1	0	▼1	
13	Communist Party of India	Telangana, Andhra Pradesh	1	1	▼3	
Total UPA Candidates			541 (Note: Congress' candidate from Gautam Buddha Nagar, Ramesh Chand Tomar joined the BJP a week before scheduled elections in the constituency.) (Note: When Congress filed a plea in Supreme Court of India to postpone elections in Gautam Buddha Nagar, it refused to postpone the elections.)	61	▼145	

== Manifesto ==
INC formed a Manifesto Committee in 2013 to prepare its manifesto. The members of the committee were:

- A. K. Antony
- P. Chidambaram
- Sushil Kumar Shinde
- Anand Sharma
- Salman Khurshid
- Sandeep Dikshit

- Mohan Gopal
- Renuka Chowdhary
- Jairam Ramesh
- Digvijay Singh
- Ajit Jogi
- PL Punia

The party released its 2014 Lok Sabha election manifesto on 26 March 2014 at the party office in Delhi. In the manifesto the party promised a "Right to Health", a "Right to homestead", a "Right to social security", a "Right to dignity and humane working conditions", a "Right to entrepreneurship" and a "Right to pension" and highlighted its achievements in bringing in a "Right to Information", MNREGA and the Food Security Bill. INC said that it would provide jobs to 100 million people in India, take all necessary measures to increase the country's GDP to 8% within 100 days of coming to power and provide inclusive growth to India. A. K. Antony said that it was the "lengthiest Manifesto so far that took five months to prepare" and that the "2014 manifesto must reflect the aspirations of the Indian people and this manifesto must bring out a new vision." While presenting the manifesto, Rahul Gandhi said "it truly reflects the voice of the people" and maintained that the party has delivered on 90% of the promises made in the previous election. Manmohan Singh said that the party had pulled 140 million people out of poverty. INC promised to waive all export taxes, return the country to a high rate of economic growth and enact all remaining anti-corruption bills.

The opposition parties accused INC of not learning from mistakes and making the same promises it had in the previous two manifestos. BJP's Mukhtar Abbas Naqvi accused INC of shirking responsibility for its failure. Brinda Karat of the Communist Party of India blamed Congress for repeatedly making the same promises and called it a "cruel joke". Aam Admi Party member Ashutosh said that Congress "cannot gain the support which it has already lost".

On 5 April, the INC mocked BJP for not releasing its manifesto, after BJP released a "charge sheet" against INC. BJP's manifesto was released on 7 April, the day when the first phase of the elections began, citing "logistical reasons" for the delay.

== Campaigning ==
The Congress party had established an election committee for all election related decision, campaigning and co-ordination. The members of the committee were:

- Sonia Gandhi (President)
- Manmohan Singh
- Rahul Gandhi
- Ahmed Patel
- Ambika Soni
- Janardan Dwivedi
- Mukul Wasnik

- Oscar Fernandes
- Girija Vyas
- Mohsina Kidwai
- A.K. Antony
- M. Veerappa Moily
- B.K. Handique
- Makhan Lal Fotedar

INC created an Election control room, headed by Randeep Surjewala, to keep track of all the events and information related to campaigning. The war room was located at 15, Rakabganj Road and kept track of 160 Lok Sabha constituencies where the party needed to boost its preparations. The Congress party initiated its election campaign in January 2014. It gave extra focus to the new middle class of India which was above the poverty line but not enough rich to be in middle class. This new economic class comprises 700 million people out of the country's total population of 1.2 billion. This class includes railway coolies, servants, rickshaw-pullers, labourers, fishermen, guards and other people who earn their living by doing minor chores.

The party created a social media platform called Khidki.com. It was designed under the supervision of national spokesperson Sandeep Dikshit with the motive of promoting the party during the elections. It was inaugurated by Rahul Gandhi during a media conclave in July 2013. While addressing a rally in Uttarakhand on 23 February, Gandhi promised that after forming the government, INC will provide free healthcare facilitates. He accused BJP of practising "politics of blood". On 15 March, he interacted with party workers, block, district and Pradesh Congress Committee presidents on Google Hangout for the first one hour and then with general public afterwards. This step was seen by media as a measure to counter Narendra Modi's "Chai pe Charcha" where he interacted with people on Internet while sipping tea. The party began its campaign in Uttar Pradesh on 23 March 2014 in Pratapgarh by organising a rally which was addressed by Rahul Gandhi, Madhusudan Mistry, Pramod Tiwari and other senior party leaders. On 29 March, Rahul Gandhi shared stage with Imran Masood's wife in Saharanpur a few hours after he was arrested for making libelous remarks on Modi. Rahul Gandhi addressed rallies in several places including Delhi, Haryana, Bardoli, Gujarat and Rajasthan. He also addressed rallies in north-eastern states of India including Kohima (Nagaland), Tezpur and Dibrugarh in Assam and Itanagar in Arunachal Pradesh.

INC's president Sonia Gandhi did rallies in Telangana, Tamil Nadu, and Delhi as part of the party's election campaigning. Manmohan Singh accused BJP of dividing the country, while addressing a rally in Uttar Pradesh. He also addressed a rally in Kerala. In Assam he criticised BJP for "always playing a destructive role" and "running a person centric campaign". He added that BJP was making promises which it could not fulfill. Singh was the party's star campaigner in Maharashtra along with Sonia and Rahul Gandhi, Ghulam Nabi Azad, Jyotiraditya Scindia, Ashok Chavan and Mohan Prakash. Sonia Gandhi also campaigned in Amethi, the constituency of Rahul Gandhi on 19 April. After she suffered an asthma attack while campaigning, her three rallies scheduled for 20 April were cancelled.

Priyanka Gandhi, while campaigned in Rae Bareli on 24 April, accused Narendra Modi of favouring businessmen by allocating land to their companies at very low prices and defended her husband Robert Vadra over the accusations of corruptions. While addressing a rally in Amethi on 5 May, Modi responded by criticising Priyanka for saying that BJP was involved in low level politics. He also added that former prime minister Rajiv Gandhi had humiliated a former chief minister of a state at an airport. Priyanka Gandhi called Modi's statement an insult to his "martyr father" and criticised BJP for involving in low level politics. INC's senior leaders felt that Priyanka's attacks on Modi had energised the party workers. Priyanka also said that it is not 56-inch chest but big heart, moral strength that are necessary to run the nation. She further said that Modi wanted power for himself and alleged that books defaming her family members were being dropped at night in the places where her public meetings were scheduled to take place. Agitated by the allegations BJP launched a CD and booklet titled Damadshree accusing Bhupinder Singh Hooda and Ashok Gehlot of helping Vadra in acquiring land in violation of the regulations. Priyanka Gandhi criticised this move of the BJP and compared it to "panicky rats". She also took a pun on Modi's remarks on Rahul Gandhi in which he called him Shahzada (prince) and Namuna (specimen), by calling Modi's behaviour childish.

On 10 May, the last day of campaigning Rahul Gandhi did a roadshow in Varanasi, the constituency from where the prime ministerial candidate of the Bharatiya Janata Party, Narendra Modi was contesting in the elections. Gandhi was accompanied by Raj Babbar, Nagma, Madhusudan Mistry and the party's candidate for the constituency Ajay Rai. He alleged that Modi was responsible for tapping the phone of a woman architect in Gujarat and had ordered police officials to spy on her. He also accused Modi for favouring Adani Group by giving them land worth ₹400 billion (US$4.2 billion) at a petty cost of Rs. 1 per square metre and promoted his party by telling people about the benefits of scholarships programs initiated by the government and MNREGA. During the roadshow family members of Bharat Ratna laureate Bismillah Khan played shehnai. The family members had refused to be the proposers when Narendra Modi filed his nomination in Varanasi.

== Advertisement ==
In January 2014 Congress party released ₹700 crore (US$73 million) for advertisement. During the same month a half-page advertisement titled Main Nahi Hum (Not me, but We) featuring Rahul Gandhi and nine people from different communities was launched for newspapers. It had a slogan—Har Hath Shakti, Har Hath Tarakki (power in every hand, progress to everyone). The advertisement also mocked Narendra Modi's Gujarat model of development and spotted a punch line—"No hand has a magic wand that can be waved to achieve progress". US-based Burson-Marsteller, JWT and Dentsu India, a Japanese publicity agency were given contracts to provide an image makeover for the party and its vice-president Rahul Gandhi. The primary focus of the advertising was to portray "Rahul Gandhi as a young, vibrant leader who will deliver on the aspirations of the common Indian."

An advertisement "Face of the Congress – Kattar Soch Nahi, Yuva Josh" was aired through TV, Radio, hoardings, newspapers etc. It featured Hasiba B. Amin, who is the Congress party's students' Wing National Student Union of India's state president from Goa. In it, she talked about the party and its approach towards youngsters of the nation and also highlights party's anti-corruption stand. Several commercials ran on televisions as part of "Bharat Nirman" campaign which is in turn a ₹100 crore (US$10 million) initiative of Information and Broadcasting Ministry. They talked about the development work undertaken by the UPA government. After the "Face of the Congress" ad was launched news about Amin's involvement in a ₹300 crore (US$31 million) scam and her jail term were disclosed and shared on social media. She denied such allegations and said that "I couldn't imagine that people could stoop so low". After the ad was launched on YouTube, a mock ad was released on YouTube titled "Har Haath Lollipop" as a lampooning by the opposition parties.

Senior leaders of the party blamed Dentsu for its defeat in the elections. They also said that Dentsu had charged too much for its services.

== Fundraising ==
Political parties in India use the money donated by willing people and organisations to campaign for elections. The Congress party received donations from General Electoral Trust, Torrent Power Ltd, the Bharti Electoral Trust, Asianet V Holding Pvt. Ltd, the Electoral Trust and ITC Ltd. to name a few. Before the commencement of elections the Cabinet of India revised the limit of election expenditure by a candidate for Parliamentary Constituencies to ₹7 million (US$73,000) in bigger states and to ₹5.4 million (US$56,000) in smaller states and all union territories except Delhi. This revision of the ceiling on election expenditure was attributed to the increase in the number of electors and polling stations as well as the increase in the cost inflation index.

== Controversies ==
During the election campaigning the party's candidate from Saharanpur, Imran Masood while addressing a rally allegedly said that he would "chop down Narendra Modi into pieces". He was arrested on 29 March, for deliberately outraging religious feelings. He filed a bail plea in Saharanpur district court, but his plea was dismissed and he was sent to a 14-day judicial custody. Madhusudan Mistry, the party's candidate from Vadodra was arrested by the police on 3 April along with 33 other party workers for vandalising Modi's poster in the city. He accused the Vadodara Municipal Corporation for favouring BJP in allotting spots for putting posters. He and the other 33 party workers were released on the same day after filling personal bonds worth ₹5,000 (US$52) each.

Former prime ministerial adviser Sanjaya Baru published a book titled The Accidental Prime Minister: The Making and Unmaking of Manmohan Singh in which he criticised Singh for not being "fully in charge of his government in having to compete with the dynastic INC leader, Sonia Gandhi, for influence within his own cabinet." Singh's office retorted in saying it is "smacks of fiction and coloured views of a former adviser." After Baru said "it is no secret that Sonia Gandhi was the super prime minister," Priyanka Vadra replied "I think Manmohan Singh ji is the super PM." The opposition targeted Sonia Gandhi on the basis of this book.

== Result ==
The Indian National Congress won 44 seats out of the 543 constituencies in the election. This was the worst defeat that Congress had suffered in its history. The Bharatiya Janata Party under the leadership of its prime ministerial candidate won 282 seats and emerged as the single largest party to form the majority government, the first time in India since the government formed by Rajiv Gandhi in 1984. After the results were announced both Sonia and Rahul Gandhi took the responsibility for the defeat and offered their resignation at a meeting of party members in Delhi but the party's working committee unanimously rejected their resignation. Manmohan Singh took the responsibility for the "shortcomings that existed at the government level." while the members of the committee said that the defeat was a collective responsibility and passed a resolution criticising the communication strategy of the government for the defeat.

State	Total Seats	Seats Won	Seat Change
Andaman & Nicobar Islands (UT)	1	0	Steady
Andhra Pradesh	42	0	▼19
Arunachal Pradesh	2	1	▼1
Assam	14	3	▼4
Bihar	40	2	Steady
Chandigarh (UT)	1	0	Steady
Chhattisgarh	11	1	Steady
Dadra & Nagar Haveli (UT)	1	1	Steady
Daman & Diu (UT)	1	1	Steady
Goa	2	1	▼1
Gujarat	26	0	▼11
Haryana	10	1	▼8
Himachal Pradesh	4	0	▼1
Jammu & Kashmir	6	0	▼2
Jharkhand	14	0	▼1
Karnataka	28	9	▲3
Kerala	20	8	▼5
Lakshadweep (UT)	1	0	▼1
Madhya Pradesh	29	2	▼10
Maharashtra	48	2	▼15
Manipur	2	2	Steady
Meghalaya	2	1	Steady
Mizoram	1	1	Steady
Nagaland	1	0	Steady
NCT of Delhi	7	0	▼7
Orissa	21	0	▼6
Puducherry (UT)	1	0	▼1
Punjab	13	3	▼5
Rajasthan	25	0	▼20
Sikkim	1	0	Steady
Tamil Nadu	39	0	Steady
Telangana	17	2	Steady
Tripura	2	0	Steady
Uttar Pradesh	80	2	▼19
Uttarakhand	5	0	▼5
West Bengal	42	4	▼2
Total	543	44	▼162

== See also ==
- Bharatiya Janata Party campaign for the 2014 Indian general election
- 2014 Indian general election
- United Progressive Alliance
