= Bharatiya Awam Party =

Bharatiya Awam Party - Rashtriya
- Leader: Najma Parveen
- Founder: Najma Parveen
- Headquarters: Mughalsarai district, Chandauli, Uttar Pradesh

The Bharatiya Awam Party is a registered unrecognised political party in India.

The majority of the party's members are Muslims. The party claims to have more than 35,000 members with over 50,000 applications. The demographic composition of the party is 90% female, with a 10% male reservation.

The party sees the Indian freedom fighter Subhas Chandra Bose as its ideal figure, and aims to represent the interests of women, of whom many are employed in Varanasi's sari industry.

The party announced unconditional support for Narendra Modi in the 2014 election, and would not contest the election, but plans to contest the 2017 polls.
