= Achhe Din Aane Waale Hain =

Indian political slogan used by the BJP

Narendra Modi with the slogan

In Indian politics, achhe din aane waale hain (lit. 'Good days are coming') was the Hindi slogan of the Bharatiya Janata Party (BJP) for the 2014 Indian general election. The slogan was coined by the BJP's Prime Ministerial candidate Narendra Modi, with the intention of conveying that a prosperous future was in store for India if the BJP came into power.

== Slogan ==
The slogan "Good days are coming" was coined by Narendra Modi, BJP's Prime Ministerial candidate for the 2014 Indian general election. According to Modi, he got the idea for the slogan from the leader of his main opposition party, Indian National Congress, and then-Prime Minister of India Manmohan Singh. On 8 January 2014, while addressing the audience during Pravasi Bharatiya Divas, Singh said, "Yes, we are facing bad days now but the good days will be coming soon". During his speech at the same event the following day, Modi referred to Singh and repeated his statement in Hindi, which stuck as the slogan, achhe din aane wale hain. The slogan was used by BJP for Modi's lead campaign for the 2014 Indian general election.

== Post-election ==
When it became clear that the BJP would win the election, Narendra Modi tweeted [that], "India has won! भारत की विजय। अच्छे दिन आने वाले हैं। ["Victory to India. Good days are coming."]" This tweet became India's most retweeted Twitter post. A victory song incorporating the slogan was also released by BJP. The slogan was considered decisive for BJP's victory. However, the slogan has also been criticised for inflating expectations that the new government can quickly turn around the economy and spur economic growth. Since the election, the slogan often has been referred to by various people while expressing their optimism about a better future under Modi's government. British politician George Osborne referred to the phrase when he came to India with a business delegation.

The slogan was used and copied by British Prime Minister David Cameron while introducing Modi at an event in Wembley Stadium, London on 13 November 2015. Cameron told the crowd, "They said a chai wala would never govern the largest democracy, but he proved them wrong. He rightly said acche din aane wale hain. But with his energy, with his vision, with his ambition. I will go on further and say acche din zaroor aayega. ("Good days are definitely coming").
