= North-East Regional Political Front =

- Founded: 21 October 2013
- Succeeded by: North-East Democratic Alliance
- Political position: Centre-right
- Alliance: NDA
- Colors

The North-East Regional Political Front (NERPF) was a political coalition that was formed on 21 October 2013 by eleven political parties in Northeast India. The motive of the new political front was to protect the interest of the people of the region. Prafulla Kumar Mahanta was appointed as the chief adviser of the front.

== Members ==
The following parties are members of NERPF:

No	Party	Current No. of MPs	Base State	Joining Date
1	Naga People's Front	1	Nagaland	October 2013
2	National People's Party	1	Meghalaya	October 2013
3	Manipur Peoples Party	0	Manipur	October 2013
4	Mizo National Front	0	Mizoram	October 2013
5	Manipur Democratic People's Front	0	Manipur	October 2013
6	People's Party of Arunachal	0	Arunachal Pradesh	October 2013
7	Indigenous Nationalist Party of Twipra	0	Tripura	October 2013
8	United Democratic Party	0	Meghalaya	October 2013
9	Hill State People's Democratic Party	0	Meghalaya	October 2013
10	Asom Gana Parishad	0	Assam	October 2013

== Support for NDA ==
NERPF pledged their alliance with the NDA for the 2014 general elections to ensure peace and development in the northeastern states.

== North East Democratic Alliance ==
In May 2016, the NERPF was expanded and renamed as North-East Democratic Alliance.

== See also ==
- National Democratic Alliance
- Coalition government
