= 2009 Indian general election campaign controversies =

Political controversies in India

The 2009 Indian general election was held in five phases between 16 April – 13 May 2009. During the course of the campaign, several controversies arose, with parties being accused by one another and the Election Commission of India of violating the model code of conduct that was in force during the election.

== Indian National Congress ==
- The Election Commission took exception to a full page advertisement on the 2010 Commonwealth Games taken out in major Delhi newspapers. The advertisement listed the infrastructural facilities that have come up in preparation for the 2010 event – including 24 flyovers, 75 aerobridge airport, 1,285 km of better roads, 5,000 low-floor buses, 80 new metro destinations, 11 world-class sports venues and thousands of job opportunities. The EC served notice to the Ministry of Youth Affairs and Sports, the Cabinet Secretary and the Chief Secretary of Delhi, stating that the advertisement is a clear violation of the model code of conduct since it enumerates the achievements of the UPA Government. The EC has also asked the violators to pay from their own pockets.
- Congress MP and Bollywood actor Govinda is being investigated by the Mumbai Suburban District Collector for giving money to supporters outside his Mumbai house on 12 March 2009.
- Andhra Pradesh Chief Minister Y. S. Rajasekhara Reddy is being investigated for addressing an election meeting within a Government school's premises during a Class 10 public examination in the school. His son-in-law Anil Kumar, an evangelist, has a case filed against him for distributing religious pamphlets promoting Government programs in a church. Three others were arrested in the case and Anil Kumar is expected to be arrested as well.
- Two Congress Lok Sabha candidates from Pilibhit and Shrawasti constituencies from Uttar Pradesh booked for violating the model code of conduct, the Congress nominee from Pilibhit B.M. Singh was registered for using as many as 98 four-wheelers in his procession, against the three authorized by the district authorities, whereas the party’s nominee from Shrawasti, V.K. Pandey, was booked for conducting a road show Tuesday without taking permission from the district authorities

== Janata Dal (United) ==
- JD(U) leader Jitan Ram Manjhi was booked by EC on 9 March 2009, for violating the model code of conduct which took effect from the day the election was announced by the EC. Manjhi attended an election meeting in Nalanda district using the official car made available to him for his position as the Social Welfare Minister in the Government of Bihar.

== Bharatiya Janata Party ==
- An FIR was filed against BJP MP & spokesperson Rajiv Pratap Rudy for holding a press conference at circuit house in Chhapra on 4 March 2009 in violation of the model of conduct.
- The EC directed the District Magistrate of Pilibhit to lodge a criminal case against the BJP's candidate Varun Gandhi for his allegedly inflammatory speech against non-Hindus made on 7 March 2009. This decision was taken after the EC had earlier issued a notice to Varun Gandhi and the BJP. After reviewing the incident, the EC found Varun Gandhi guilty of violating the model code of conduct by creating feeling of enmity and hatred between different communities. However, since Varun has not been convicted by a court of law, the EC can not bar him from contesting the election. Instead, they have recommended to his party, the BJP, to drop him from their list of candidates. The BJP have since come out in support of Varun and have refused to drop Varun as a candidate, saying that the EC has no right to provide such a recommendation. He was then sent to judicial custody and booked under the National Security Act by the government of Uttar Pradesh Chief Minister Mayawati on charges of inciting communal tensions. He was subsequently elected with the biggest majority of anyone of the four Gandhi family candidates running in the election, including his mother, aunt and first-cousin.
- Former Finance Minister of India Jaswant Singh was shown on tape on 31 March 2009 distributing money during an election meeting in Gajaria village in Barmer. Singh's son Manvendra Singh is contesting the election on a BJP ticket from Barmer. The District Collector of Barmer collected and presented the facts of the incident to the EC. Jaswant Singh has denied the charges of violating the model code of conduct, instead saying that it was the party tradition to help the poor and needy.
- Former BJP Lok Sabha MP Ananth Kumar Hegde became the second BJP leader of this election to be reported for making a hate speech against a particular community. During an election rally at Karwar, Kumar allegedly threatened to prevent Muslims from celebrating religious festivals after cautioning the people against activities of Islamist groups. Karnataka's Chief Electoral Officer has sent a report on this incident along with a CD of Kumar's speech to the CEC.

== Samajwadi Party ==
- SP's chief Mulayam Singh Yadav was issued a notice on 12 March 2009, by the EC for allegedly bribing voters during an election rally on 11 March in his native village of Safai in Etawah Lok Sabha constituency. The party workers were seen distributing Rs. 100 notes to all those who attended the rally. The party claims that the money was being given away as a gift to the people of the village and that the gathering was to celebrate the festival of Holi and was not a political rally. On 31 March 2009, the EC decided not to proceed on this case and no action will be taken against either Mulayam Singh Yadav or the party.
- The EC on 30 March 2009 also served notice to Mulayam Singh Yadav for his alleged threats against Ministhy Dileep, the District Magistrate of Mainpuri. Mulayam is expected to contest the election from Mainpuri Lok Sabha constituency.
- Jaya Prada, the Samajwadi Party candidate in Rampur was issued a notice by the Election Commission on 26 April 2009, for violating the code of conduct by distributing bindis to women in Rampur's Swar locality.
