= Opinion polling for the 2014 Indian general election =

Indian lower house election opinion poll

In the run up to the 2014 Indian general election, various organisations carried out opinion polls to gauge voting intention in India. Results of such polls are displayed in this article. The date range for these opinion polls are from the Jan 2013 to April 2014. Many organisations have gone on to conduct exit polls and post-poll surveys as well, which too are displayed.

== Background ==
Opinion polls in India can be controversial. These charges include partisan manipulation.

Opinion poll methodology has heavily improved and agencies like CSDS have got it absolutely correct on 16 occasions, roughly correct on 7 occasions and wrong on 4 occasions.

Post-poll surveys or Exit Polls, widely published, are fundamentally different from opinion polls. According to a study, post-poll surveys in the past have consistently overestimated BJP seats. However, in 2014, it was the opposite and most exit polls underestimated the number of seats to be won by BJP and allies.

== Opinion polls ==
=== Seats ===
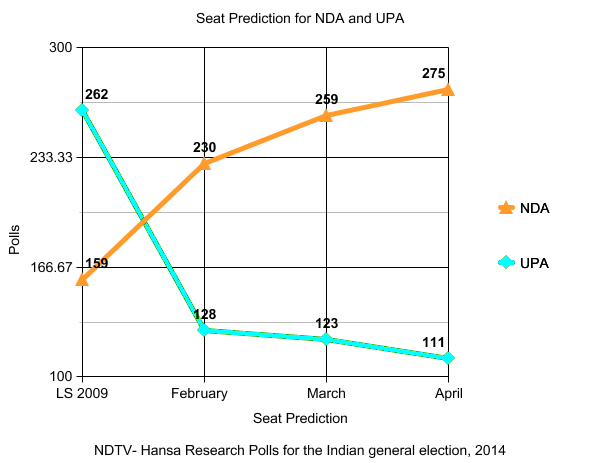
NDTV - Hansa Research seat predictions

When conducted	Ref	Polling organisation/agency	Sample size				
When conducted	Ref	Polling organisation/agency	Sample size	UPA	NDA	Left	Other
Jan–Mar 2013		Times Now-CVoter	No sample size provided	128	184	–	–
Apr–May 2013		Headlines Today-CVoter	120,000	209 (without Modi); 155(with Modi)	179(without Modi); 220 (with Modi)	–	–
May 2013		ABP News-Nielsen	33,408	136	206	–	–
Jul 2013		The Week – Hansa Research	No sample size provided	184	197	–	162
Jul 2013		CNN-IBN and The Hindu by CSDS	19,062	149–157	172–180	–	208–224
Jul 2013		Times Now-India Today-CVoter	36,914	134 (INC 119)	156 (BJP 131)	–	–
Aug–Oct 2013		Times Now-India TV-CVoter	24,284	117 (INC 102)	186 (BJP 162)	–	240
Dec 2013 – Jan 2014		India Today-CVoter	21,792	103 (INC 91)	212 (BJP 188)	–	228
Dec 2013 – Jan 2014		ABP News-Nielsen	64,006	101 (INC 81)	226 (BJP 210)	–	216
Jan 2014		CNN-IBN-Lokniti-CSDS	18,591	107 – 127 (INC 92 – 108)	211 – 231 (BJP 192 – 210)	–	205
Jan–Feb 2014		Times Now-India TV-CVoter	14,000	101 (INC 89)	227 (BJP 202)	–	215
Feb 2014		ABP News-Nielsen	29,000	92	236	29	186
Feb 2014		CNN-IBN-Lokniti-CSDS	29,000	119 – 139 (INC 94 – 110)	212 – 232 (BJP 193 – 213)	105–193	
March 2014		NDTV- Hansa Research	46,571	128	230	55	130
March 2014		CNN-IBN-Lokniti-CSDS	20,957	111–123	234–246	174–198	
April 2014		NDTV- Hansa Research	24,000	111 (INC 92)	275 (BJP 226)	157	

=== Votes ===
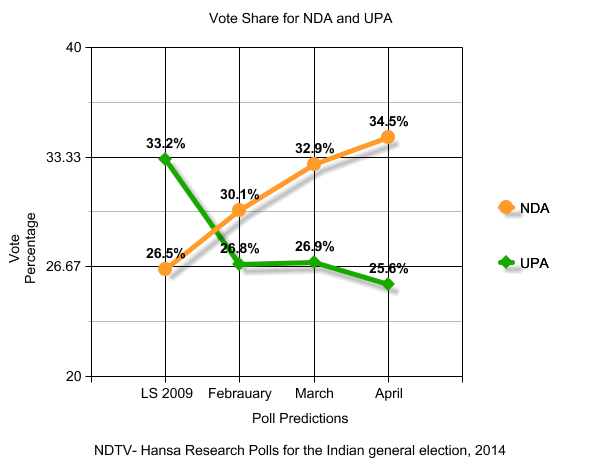
NDTV - Hansa Research vote share predictions

When conducted	Ref	Polling organisation/agency	Sample size				
When conducted	Ref	Polling organisation/agency	Sample size	UPA	NDA	Left	Other
December 2013 – January 2014		India Today-CVoter	21,792	23%	34%	–	43%
December 2013 – January 2014		ABP News-Nielsen	64,006	23%	31%	5%	41%
January 2014		CNN-IBN-Lokniti-CSDS	18,591	36% (INC 27%)	28% (BJP 34%)	4%	32%
February 2014		ABP News-Nielsen		20	46	5%	40%
April 2014		NDTV- Hansa Research	24,000	25.6%	34.5%	39.9%	

== Graphs ==
- NDA
- UPA
- Others
- NDA
- UPA
- Others

== Statewise opinion polling ==
=== Andhra Pradesh (42) ===
NDTV - Hansa Research April 2014 opinion poll for Andhra Pradesh

BJP +TDP Alliance - 18 seats
YSR Congress - 9 seats
TRS - 8 seats
INC - 6 seats

When conducted	Ref	Polling organisation/agency	Sample size					
When conducted	Ref	Polling organisation/agency	Sample size	INC	BJP	TDP	YSR Congress	TRS
Aug–Oct 2013		Times Now-India TV-CVoter	24,284	7	–	8	13	13
Dec 2013 – Jan 2014		India Today-CVoter	21,792	7	–	8	13	13
Jan–Feb 2014		Times Now-India TV-CVoter	14,000	6	2	10	13	10
March 2014		NDTV- Hansa Research	46,571	6	9		15	9
March–April 2014		CNN-IBN-Lokniti-CSDS	1308	4–8	13–19		9–15	4–8
April 2014		NDTV- Hansa Research	24,000	6	18		9	8
4–12 April 2014		India Today-Cicero	1358	4–6	17–21		7–11	6–10

=== Arunachal Pradesh (2) ===
When conducted	Ref	Polling organisation/agency	Sample size		
When conducted	Ref	Polling organisation/agency	Sample size	INC	BJP
Aug–Oct 2013		Times Now-India TV-CVoter	24,284	1	1
Jan–Feb 2014		Times Now-India TV-CVoter	14,000	1	1

=== Assam (14) ===
NDTV - Hansa Research March 2014 opinion poll for Assam

INC - 12 seats
BJP - 1 seats
Others - 1 seats

When conducted	Ref	Polling organisation/agency	Sample size					
When conducted	Ref	Polling organisation/agency	Sample size	INC	BJP	AGP	AUDF	BPF
Aug–Oct 2013		Times Now-India TV-CVoter	24,284	9	3	0	1	1
Jan–Feb 2014		Times Now-India TV-CVoter	14,000	7	5	0	1	1
March 2014		NDTV- Hansa Research	46,571	12	1	0	0	0

=== Bihar (40) ===
Latest NDTV - Hansa Research April 2014 opinion poll for Bihar

BJP+LJP Alliance - 24 seats
INC +RJD+NCP Alliance - 12 seats
JD(U) - 4 seats

When conducted	Ref	Polling organisation/agency	Sample size				
When conducted	Ref	Polling organisation/agency	Sample size	INC-RJD-NCP	BJP-LJP	JD(U)	Others
Aug–Oct 2013		Times Now-India TV-CVoter	24,284	15	15	9	1
Dec 2013 – Jan 2014		India Today-CVoter	21,792	13	22	4	1
Jan–Feb 2014		Times Now-India TV-CVoter	14,000	13	22	5	0
March 2014		NDTV- Hansa Research	46,571	11	23	5	1
March–April 2014		CNN-IBN-Lokniti-CSDS	1557	7–13	21–29	2–5	0–3
30 March – 2 April 2014		India Today-Cicero	1498	15–19	20–24	0–2	0–1
April 2014		NDTV- Hansa Research	24,000	12	24	4	0

=== Chhattisgarh (11) ===
Latest NDTV - Hansa Research April 2014 opinion poll for Chhattisgarh

BJP - 8 seats
INC - 3 seats

When conducted	Ref	Polling organisation/agency	Sample size		
When conducted	Ref	Polling organisation/agency	Sample size	INC	BJP
Aug–Oct 2013		Times Now-India TV-CVoter	24,284	3	8
Jan–Feb 2014		Times Now-India TV-CVoter	14,000	3	8
March 2014		NDTV- Hansa Research	46,571	2	9
April 2014		NDTV- Hansa Research	24,000	3	8

=== Goa (2) ===
When conducted	Ref	Polling organisation/agency	Sample size		
When conducted	Ref	Polling organisation/agency	Sample size	INC	BJP
Aug–Oct 2013		Times Now-India TV-CVoter	24,284	1	1
Jan–Feb 2014		Times Now-India TV-CVoter	14,000	1	1

=== Gujarat (26) ===
Latest NDTV - Hansa Research April 2014 opinion poll for Gujarat

BJP - 22 seats
INC - 4 seats

When conducted	Ref	Polling organisation/agency	Sample size			
When conducted	Ref	Polling organisation/agency	Sample size	INC	BJP	Others
Aug–Oct 2013		Times Now-India TV-CVoter	24,284	4	22	0
Dec 2013 – Jan 2014		India Today-CVoter	21,792	5	21	0
Jan–Feb 2014		Times Now-India TV-CVoter	14,000	4	22	0
March 2014		NDTV- Hansa Research	46,571	3	23	0
March–April 2014		CNN-IBN-Lokniti-CSDS	917	0–4	20–26	0–2
April 2014		NDTV- Hansa Research	24,000	4	22	0

=== Haryana (10) ===
Latest NDTV - Hansa Research April 2014 opinion poll for Haryana

BJP +HJC Alliance - 6 seats
INC - 2 seats
INLD - 2 seats

When conducted	Ref	Polling organisation/agency	Sample size				
When conducted	Ref	Polling organisation/agency	Sample size	INC	BJP-HJC	INLD	AAP
Aug–Oct 2013		Times Now-India TV-CVoter	24,284	5	4	1	0
Jan–Feb 2014		Times Now-India TV-CVoter	14,000	1	7	1	1
March 2014		NDTV- Hansa Research	46,571	3	7	0	0
April 2014		NDTV- Hansa Research	24,000	2	6	2	0

=== Himachal Pradesh (4) ===
When conducted	Ref	Polling organisation/agency	Sample size		
When conducted	Ref	Polling organisation/agency	Sample size	INC	BJP
Aug–Oct 2013		Times Now-India TV-CVoter	24,284	1	3
Jan–Feb 2014		Times Now-India TV-CVoter	14,000	1	3

=== Jammu and Kashmir (6) ===
When conducted	Ref	Polling organisation/agency	Sample size					
When conducted	Ref	Polling organisation/agency	Sample size	INC	BJP	PDP	NC	Others (IND. & People's Conference)
Aug–Oct 2013		Times Now-India TV-CVoter	24,284	1	1	1	2	1
Jan–Feb 2014		Times Now-India TV-CVoter	14,000	1	2	2	1	0

=== Jharkhand (14) ===
Latest NDTV - Hansa Research April 2014 opinion poll for Jharkhand

BJP - 12 seats
INC - 1 seats
JMM - 1 seats

When conducted	Ref	Polling organisation/agency	Sample size					
When conducted	Ref	Polling organisation/agency	Sample size	INC	BJP	JMM	JVM	Others
Aug–Oct 2013		Times Now-India TV-CVoter	24,284	1	6	2	3	2
Jan–Feb 2014		Times Now-India TV-CVoter	14,000	1	8	2	2	1
March 2014		NDTV- Hansa Research	46,571	4	6	2	0	2
April 2014		NDTV- Hansa Research	24,000	1	12	1	0	0

=== Karnataka (28) ===
Latest NDTV - Hansa Research April 2014 opinion poll for Karnataka

BJP - 12 seats
INC - 14 seats
JD(S) - 2 seats

When conducted	Ref	Polling organisation/agency	Sample size					
When conducted	Ref	Polling organisation/agency	Sample size	INC	BJP	JD(S)	AAP	Others
Aug–Oct 2013		Times Now-India TV-CVoter	24,284	13	12	3	0	0
Dec 2013 – Jan 2014		India Today-CVoter	21,792	12	13	0	0	3
Jan–Feb 2014		Times Now-India TV-CVoter	14,000	14	11	2	1	0
March 2014		NDTV- Hansa Research	46,571	6	20	2	0	0
March–April 2014		CNN-IBN-Lokniti-CSDS	825	12–18	7–13	1 – 4 (Including Others)	0	1 – 4 (Including JD(S))
April 2014		NDTV- Hansa Research	24,000	14	12	2	0	0

=== Kerala (20) ===
Latest NDTV - Hansa Research April 2014 opinion poll for Kerala

LDF - 12 seats
UDF - 8 seats

When conducted	Ref	Polling organisation/agency	Sample size					
When conducted	Ref	Polling organisation/agency	Sample size	BJP	LDF	INC	KC(M)	IUML
Aug–Oct 2013		Times Now-India TV-CVoter	24,284	0	13	4	1	2
Dec 2013 – Jan 2014		India Today-CVoter	21,792	–	11	6	–	–
Jan–Feb 2014		Times Now-India TV-CVoter	14,000	1	9	7	1	2
March 2014		NDTV- Hansa Research	46,571	0	13	7 (As UDF)		
March–April 2014		CNN-IBN-Lokniti-CSDS	607	0	4–8	11 – 17 (As UDF)		
April 2014		NDTV- Hansa Research	24,000	0	12	8 (As UDF)		

=== Madhya Pradesh (29) ===
Latest NDTV - Hansa Research April 2014 opinion poll for Madhya Pradesh

BJP - 26 seats
INC - 3 seats

When conducted	Ref	Polling organisation/agency	Sample size				
When conducted	Ref	Polling organisation/agency	Sample size	INC	BJP	BSP	Others
Aug–Oct 2013		Times Now-India TV-CVoter	24,284	6	23	0	0
Dec 2013 – Jan 2014		India Today-CVoter	21,792	6	22	0	1
Jan–Feb 2014		Times Now-India TV-CVoter	14,000	5	24	0	0
March 2014		NDTV- Hansa Research	46,571	4	24	1	0
March–April 2014		CNN-IBN-Lokniti-CSDS	1121	1–5	24–28	0	0
April 2014		NDTV- Hansa Research	24,000	3	26	0	0

=== Maharashtra (48) ===
Latest NDTV - Hansa Research April 2014 opinion poll for Maharashtra

BJP +Shiv Sena Alliance - 37 seats
INC +NCP Alliance - 9 seats
Others - 2 seats

When conducted	Ref	Polling organisation/agency	Sample size					
When conducted	Ref	Polling organisation/agency	Sample size	INC	NCP	BJP	SS	Others
Aug–Oct 2013		Times Now-India TV-CVoter	24,284	11	6	15	14	2
Dec 2013 – Jan 2014		India Today-CVoter	21,792	9	5	14	14	6
Jan–Feb 2014		Times Now-India TV-CVoter	14,000	8	5	17	15	3
March 2014		NDTV- Hansa Research	46,571	12		33		3
March 2014		ABP News-Nielsen	Not Available	8	5	19	12	4
March–April 2014		CNN-IBN-Lokniti-CSDS	1662	16–22		24–30		1–3
April 2014		NDTV- Hansa Research	24,000	9		37		2

=== Manipur (2) ===
When conducted	Ref	Polling organisation/agency	Sample size			
When conducted	Ref	Polling organisation/agency	Sample size	INC	BJP	Others
Aug–Oct 2013		Times Now-India TV-CVoter	24,284	2	0	0
Jan–Feb 2014		Times Now-India TV-CVoter	14,000	1	0	1

=== Meghalaya (2) ===
When conducted	Ref	Polling organisation/agency	Sample size		
When conducted	Ref	Polling organisation/agency	Sample size	INC	NPP
Aug–Oct 2013		Times Now-India TV-CVoter	24,284	1	1
Jan–Feb 2014		Times Now-India TV-CVoter	14,000	1	1

=== Mizoram (1) ===
When conducted	Ref	Polling organisation/agency	Sample size		
When conducted	Ref	Polling organisation/agency	Sample size	INC	Others
Aug–Oct 2013		Times Now-India TV-CVoter	24,284	0	1
Jan–Feb 2014		Times Now-India TV-CVoter	14,000	1	0

=== Nagaland (1) ===
When conducted	Ref	Polling organisation/agency	Sample size		
When conducted	Ref	Polling organisation/agency	Sample size	NPF	Others
Aug–Oct 2013		Times Now-India TV-CVoter	24,284	1	0
Jan–Feb 2014		Times Now-India TV-CVoter	14,000	1	0

=== Odisha (21) ===
Latest NDTV - Hansa Research April 2014 opinion poll for Odisha

BJD - 13 seats
BJP - 7 seats
INC - 1 seats

When conducted	Ref	Polling organisation/agency	Sample size				
When conducted	Ref	Polling organisation/agency	Sample size	INC	BJP	BJD	Others
Aug–Oct 2013		Times Now-India TV-CVoter	24,284	9	0	12	0
Dec 2013 – Jan 2014		India Today-CVoter	21,792	8	0	13	0
Jan–Feb 2014		Times Now-India TV-CVoter	14,000	7	2	12	0
March 2014		NDTV- Hansa Research	46,571	3	1	17	0
March–April 2014		CNN-IBN-Lokniti-CSDS	796	0–4	3–7	10–16	0–2
April 2014		NDTV- Hansa Research	24,000	1	7	13	0

=== Punjab (13) ===
Latest NDTV - Hansa Research April 2014 opinion poll for Punjab

BJP +SAD Alliance - 7 seats
INC - 6 seats

When conducted	Ref	Polling organisation/agency	Sample size			
When conducted	Ref	Polling organisation/agency	Sample size	INC	BJP	SAD
Aug–Oct 2013		Times Now-India TV-CVoter	24,284	4	2	7
Jan–Feb 2014		Times Now-India TV-CVoter	14,000	6	2	5
March 2014		NDTV- Hansa Research	46,571	8	5	
April 2014		NDTV- Hansa Research	24,000	6	7	

=== Rajasthan (25) ===
Latest NDTV - Hansa Research April 2014 opinion poll for Rajasthan

BJP - 21 seats
INC - 3 seats
Others - 1 seats

When conducted	Ref	Polling organisation/agency	Sample size			
When conducted	Ref	Polling organisation/agency	Sample size	INC	BJP	Others
Aug–Oct 2013		Times Now-India TV-CVoter	24,284	5	19	1
Dec 2013 – Jan 2014		India Today-CVoter	21,792	3	21	1
Jan–Feb 2014		Times Now-India TV-CVoter	14,000	4	21	0
March 2014		NDTV- Hansa Research	46,571	5	19	1
March–April 2014		CNN-IBN-Lokniti-CSDS	837	0–2	21–25	0–2
April 2014		NDTV- Hansa Research	24,000	3	21	1

=== Sikkim (1) ===
When conducted	Ref	Polling organisation/agency	Sample size			
When conducted	Ref	Polling organisation/agency	Sample size	INC	BJP	SDF
Jan–Feb 2014		Times Now-India TV-CVoter	14,000	0	0	1

=== Tamil Nadu (39) ===
Latest NDTV - Hansa Research April 2014 opinion poll for Tamil Nadu

AIADMK - 22 seats
DMK Alliance - 14 seats
BJP Alliance - 3 seats

When conducted	Ref	Polling organisation/agency	Sample size					
When conducted	Ref	Polling organisation/agency	Sample size	INC	BJP	AIADMK	DMK	Others
Aug–Oct 2013		Times Now-India TV-CVoter	24,284	1	0	28	5	5
Dec 2013 – Jan 2014		India Today-CVoter	21,792	0	–	29	5	5
Jan–Feb 2014		Times Now-India TV-CVoter	14,000	1	0	27	5	6
March 2014		NDTV- Hansa Research	46,571	0	0	27	10	2
March–April 2014		CNN-IBN-Lokniti-CSDS	1460	0	6 – 10 (In alliance)	15–21	10 – 16 (In alliance)	0
April 2014		NDTV- Hansa Research	24,000	0	3 (In alliance)	22	14 (In alliance)	0
4–12 April 2014		India Today-Cicero	1358	0	4 – 6 (In alliance)	20–24	9 – 13 (In alliance)	0–2

=== Tripura (2) ===
When conducted	Ref	Polling organisation/agency	Sample size			
When conducted	Ref	Polling organisation/agency	Sample size	INC	BJP	CPI(M)
Aug–Oct 2013		Times Now-India TV-CVoter	24,284	0	0	2
Jan–Feb 2014		Times Now-India TV-CVoter	14,000	0	0	2

=== Uttar Pradesh (80) ===
Latest NDTV - Hansa Research April 2014 opinion poll for Uttar Pradesh

BJP - 74 seats
INC - 1 seats
BSP - 1 seats
SP - 4 seats

When conducted	Ref	Polling organisation/agency	Sample size					
When conducted	Ref	Polling organisation/agency	Sample size	INC	BJP	SP	BSP	Others
Aug–Oct 2013		Times Now-India TV-CVoter	24,284	7	17	25	31	0
Dec 2013 – Jan 2014		India Today-CVoter	21,792	4	30	20	24	2
Dec 2013 – Jan 2014		ABP News-Nielsen	64,006	12	35	14	15	4
Jan–Feb 2014		Times Now-India TV-CVoter	14,000	5	34	20	21	0
Feb 2014		ABP News-Nielsen	29,000	11	40	13	14	2
March 2014		NDTV- Hansa Research	46,571	12	40	13	15	0
March–April 2014		CNN-IBN-Lokniti-CSDS	2633	4 – 8	42 – 50	11–17	10–16	0–2
30 March – 3 April 2014		India Today-Cicero	1498	6 – 10	42 – 50	15–21	9–13	0–2
April 2014		NDTV- Hansa Research	24,000	5	51	14	10	0

=== Uttarakhand (5) ===
When conducted	Ref	Polling organisation/agency	Sample size		
When conducted	Ref	Polling organisation/agency	Sample size	INC	BJP
Aug–Oct 2013		Times Now-India TV-CVoter	24,284	0	5
Jan–Feb 2014		Times Now-India TV-CVoter	14,000	0	5

=== West Bengal (42) ===
Latest NDTV - Hansa Research April 2014 opinion poll for West Bengal

AITC - 30 seats
Left Front - 8 seats
INC - 4 seats

When conducted	Ref	Polling organisation/agency	Sample size					
When conducted	Ref	Polling organisation/agency	Sample size	INC	BJP	AITC	Left Front	Others
Aug–Oct 2013		Times Now-India TV-CVoter	24,284	3	0	23	16	0
Dec 2013 – Jan 2014		India Today-CVoter	21,792	2	0	23	16	1
Jan–Feb 2014		Times Now-India TV-CVoter	14,000	2	1	24	14	1
March 2014		NDTV- Hansa Research	46,571	1	0	32	9	0
March–April 2014		CNN-IBN-Lokniti-CSDS	1440	4–7	0–1	23–29	7–13	0
1 – 5 April 2014		India Today-Cicero	1706	6–10	0–3	23–27	7–11	0–1
April 2014		NDTV- Hansa Research	24,000	4	0	30	8	0

== Union Territories ==
=== NCT of Delhi (7) ===
Latest NDTV - Hansa Research April 2014 opinion poll for Delhi

BJP - 7 seats
AAP - 0 seats

When conducted	Ref	Polling organisation/agency	Sample size			
When conducted	Ref	Polling organisation/agency	Sample size	INC	BJP	AAP
Aug–Oct 2013		Times Now-India TV-CVoter	24,284	3	4	0
Jan–Feb 2014		Times Now-India TV-CVoter	14,000	0	4	3
March 2014		NDTV- Hansa Research	46,571	1	2	4
March–April 2014		CNN-IBN-Lokniti-CSDS	891	0–1	3–4	2–3
28–29 March 2014		India Today- Cicero	1,188	0–2	5–7	1–2
April 2014		NDTV- Hansa Research	24,000	0	7	0

=== Other Union Territories (6) ===
When conducted	Ref	Polling organisation/agency	Sample size				
When conducted	Ref	Polling organisation/agency	Sample size	INC	BJP	AAP	Others
Aug–Oct 2013		Times Now-India TV-CVoter	24,284	1	4	0	1
Jan–Feb 2014		Times Now-India TV-CVoter	14,000	1	3	1	1

== Other findings ==
The eight largest metropolises in India are considered important because they constitute 31 seats, larger than some regions altogether. In the previous election, the INC-led UPA won 24 of these seats, but the UPA is trailing in these areas. A NDTV opinion poll in Uttar Pradesh indicated that the BJP would win its largest share of seats in the region by winning 40 of the 80 seats. BSP would get 15 seats, SP would get 13 seats, INC-RLD will get 12 seats, amongst its losses will Ajit Singh. The poll also asked those in Gujarat if Modi should run from U.P., of which 67% responded negatively, while those in U.P. said by 62% that they would like to see him run from there. A survey of first time voters suggested Modi was the most popular prime ministerial candidate and Mamata Banerjee was the most popular outside the BJP or INC. Latest survey by CNN-IBN-Lokniti predicts the decline (by 5%) in popularity of Narendra Modi as PM candidate.

== Exit polls ==
When conducted	Ref	Polling organisation/agency	Constituencies polled				
When conducted	Ref	Polling organisation/agency	Constituencies polled	UPA	NDA	TF	Other
April/May 2014 (post-poll)		CNN-IBN-Lokniti-CSDS	287	92–102 (INC 72–82)	270–282 (BJP 230–242)	125–171	
April/May 2014 (exit+post-poll)		India Today – Cicero	543	110–120	261–283	150–162	
April/May 2014 (exit+post-poll)		News 24-Today's Chanakya	479	61–79 (INC 48–66)	326–354 (BJP 277–305)	122–144	

Publish Date	Ref	Polling Organisation			
Publish Date	Ref	Polling Organisation	NDA	UPA	Other
12 May 2014		CNN-IBN – CSDS – Lokniti	276	97	148
12 May 2014		India Today – Cicero	272	115	156
12 May 2014		News 24 – Chanakya	340	70	133
12 May 2014		Times Now – ORG	249	148	146
12 May 2014		ABP News – Nielsen	274	97	165
12 May 2014		India TV – CVoter	289	101	148
14 May 2014		NDTV – Hansa Research	279	103	161
14 May 2014		CNN-IBN – CSDS	280	97	148
12 May 2014		Poll of Polls	283	105	149

== Controversy ==
Polling agencies have been criticised by some political parties, intellectuals and political scholars. One of the limitations in making predictions is the modelling the relationship between vote share and the number of seats.

A controversy erupted when a lowly rated news channel News Express released footage of a sting operation named Operation Polly which alleged that a number of polling agencies were involved in malpractices such as juggling with the statistics and results. The sting was aimed to suggest that Polling agencies are fudging numbers. The allegation included global research Giants like Ipsos and CVoter, whose contract with the India Today group was suspended briefly.
