= India TV =

Indian Hindi-language news channel

- Logo used since 2013
- Country: India
- Broadcast area: Worldwide
- Headquarters: B-30, Sector 85, Noida, Uttar Pradesh, India

Programming
- Language: Hindi
- Picture format: 1080i HDTV

Ownership
- Parent: Independent News Service Pvt Ltd

History
- Launched: 20 May 2004; 22 years ago
- Founder: Rajat Sharma; Ritu Dhawan

Links
- Website: indiatv.in indiatvnews.com indiatvspeednews.com

Availability

Streaming media
- India TV Live: Official streaming link

India TV is an Indian Hindi-language news channel based in Noida, Uttar Pradesh, India. It was launched on 20 May 2004 by Rajat Sharma and his wife Ritu Dhawan. The channel is a subsidiary of Independent News Service, which was co-founded by Sharma and Dhawan in 1997. A rebranding of the channel took place in February 2022.

== History ==
In 1997, Rajat Sharma and Ritu Dhawan set up the Independent News Service (INS), the parent company which owns India TV. He co-founded India TV with his wife in April 2004 from a studio in Film City, Noida, India TV. Its Broadcast Centre is in Sector 85, Noida, Uttar Pradesh, India.

Prior to launching India TV, Sharma was previously the anchor of Aap Ki Adalat on Zee News and Janata Ki Adalat on Star News (now ABP News).

The channel has been accused of publishing pro-government content in favour of the Modi administration in a Bloomberg report.

As of 2024, the news channel has been described as right-wing.
