= Kamlesh Patel =

Kamlesh Patel may refer to:

- Kamlesh Patel (Daaji), Indian religious leader
- Kamlesh Patel, Baron Patel of Bradford (born 1960), British-Indian politician
- Kamlesh Patel (politician), Indian politician
