= Opinion polling on the Narendra Modi premiership =

A number of opinion polls have been conducted regarding the premiership of Narendra Modi.

== Overall approval ==
=== By Pew Research Center ===
Area polled	Segment polled	Polling group	Date	Approve	Disapprove	Unsure	Sample size	Margin of error	Polling method	Source(s)
India	All adults	Pew Research Center	25 March – 11 May 2023	79% (55% Very favorable)	20%	1%	2,611	2.8 percentage points	Face-to-face	
India	All adults	Pew Research Center	21 February – 10 March 2017	88% (69% Very favorable)	10% (6% Very unfavorable)	2%	2,464	3.7 percentage points	Face-to-face	
India	All adults	Pew Research Center	7 April – 24 May 2016	81% (57% Very favorable)	16% (6% Very unfavorable)	3%	2,464	3.2 percentage points	Face-to-face	
India	All adults	Pew Research Center	6 April – 19 May 2015	87% (68% Very favorable)	11% (5% Very unfavorable)	2%	2,452	3.2 percentage points	Face-to-face	
India	All adults	Pew Research Center	7 December 2013 – 12 January 2014	78% (60% Very favorable)	16%	6%	2,464			

=== By India Today ===
Area polled	Segment polled	Polling group	Date	Approve	Disapprove	Average	Unsure	Sample size	Polling method	Source(s)
India	All adults	India Today	August 2026	51%	27%	17%		116,979		
India	All adults	India Today	January 2026	57%	24%	16%		125,979		
India	All adults	India Today	1 July – 14 August 2025	58% (34.2% Outstanding)	26%	15.3%		206,826	Telephone	
India	All adults	India Today	2 January – 9 February 2025	62% (36% Outstanding)	21%	16%	1%	125,123	Telephone	
India	All adults	India Today	3 – 13 January 2021	74% (30% Outstanding)	8%	17%	1%	12,232	Telephone	
India	All adults	India Today	15 – 27 July 2020	78% (30% Outstanding)	5%	17%		12,071	Telephone	
Global	India Today online readers	India Today	August 2017	63% (20% Very good)	12%	23%	1%		Online	

=== By Morning Consult ===
Area polled	Segment polled	Polling group	Date	Approve	Disapprove	Average	Unsure	Sample size	Polling method	Source(s)
Global	All adults	Morning Consult	July 2025	75%	18%		7%		Online interviews	
Global	All adults	Morning Consult	January 2022	71%	21%		8%	3,000 - 5,000	Interviews	
Global	All adults	Morning Consult	September 2021	70%	25%		5%	2,126	Online interviews	

=== By others ===
Area polled	Segment polled	Polling group	Date	Approve	Disapprove	Average	Unsure	Sample size	Polling method	Source(s)
India	All adults		August 2024	49%	22%		29%		Online interviews	
India	All adults		30 May 2022	67%	30%		3%	64,000		
India	All adults	IANS-CVoter COVID-19	16 March – 21 April 2020	93.5%						
India	All adults	IANS-CVoter COVID-19	25 March 2020	76.8%						
India	All adults	IANS-CVoter	November 2019 – January 2020	83.1% (62.3% Very much satisfied)	16.8%			30,240		
Global	Online mood	The Economic Times	September 2019	64%	36%				Online	
Global	The Times of India Online readers	The Times of India	May 2017	76% (48% Very good)	11%	13%	2%	>1,000,000	Online	

=== Graph ===
This shows only polls with known sample sizes meant to be representative of Indians. Global polls are not included.

Polling aggregates
- Government evaluation
- Good/Excellent
- Regular
- Bad/Terrible
- Unsure/No Opinion

View source data.

== Issue-specific ==
=== COVID-19 ===
The government under Narendra Modi faced the COVID-19 pandemic in India.

Area polled	Segment polled	Polling group	Date	Approve	Disapprove	Average	Unsure	Sample size	Polling method	Source(s)
India (rural areas)	All adults	Gaon Connection and Lokniti-CSDS	30 May – 16 July 2020	74.7% (37.3% very satisfied)	14.7% (6.1% very dissatisfied)	–	–	25,371	Face-to-face	

== Historical rankings ==
The Mood of the Nation survey conducted annually between 2016 and 2021 consistently listed Modi as the most popular prime minister among Indian public. A YouGov-Mint-CPR survey in 2022 also ranked Modi first, with Jawaharlal Nehru and Atal Bihari Vajpayee being in the second and third places respectively.

== See also ==
- Opinion polling for the 2014 Indian general election
- Opinion polling for the 2019 Indian general election
- Opinion polling for the 2024 Indian general election
- Opinion polling for the next Indian general election
- List of heads of the executive by approval rating
