= Kamlesh Patel (politician) =

Indian politician (died 2024)

Kamlesh Patel (died 17 October 2024) was an Indian politician and member of the Bharatiya Janata Party. Patel was a member of the Gujarat Legislative Assembly from 1990 to 2002 from the Maninagar constituency in Eastern side of the city Ahmedabad. He vacated his seat for Narendra Modi who resigned from the seat to become Chief Minister of Gujarat. He was later the Chairman of Tourism Corporation of Gujarat Limited. Patel died on 17 October 2024.
