= Opinion polling on the Bongbong Marcos presidency =

Opinion polling on the 17th president of the Philippines

Opinion polling, commonly known as surveys in the Philippines, on the presidency of Bongbong Marcos has been conducted by various pollsters since the start of his tenure.

== Approval ratings of Bongbong Marcos ==
=== 2026 ===
Fieldwork date(s)	Pollster	Sample size	MoE	Approve	Disapprove	Undecided/no opinion	Net
Sep 21 – 27	SWS	1,500	±3.0%	35	46	20	-11
Jun 28 – Jul 3; Jul 6	Pulse Asia	2,400	±2.0%	29	50	21	-21
Jun 20 – 29	SWS	1,200	±3.0%	38	45	17	-7
Mar 24 – 31	SWS	1,500	±3.0%	33	49	18	-15
Mar 19 – 25	OCTA	1,200	±3.0%	55	26	19	+29
Mar 10 – 17	WR Numero	1,455	±3.0%	29	47	24	-18
Feb 27 – Mar 2	Pulse Asia	1,200	±2.8%	36	45	19	-9

=== 2025 ===
Fieldwork date(s)	Pollster	Sample size	MoE	Approve	Disapprove	Undecided/no opinion	Net
Dec 16 – 20	OCTA	1,200	±3.0%	51	27	22	+24
Dec 12 – 15	Pulse Asia	1,200	±2.8%	34	48	18	-14
Nov 24 – 30	SWS	1,200	±3.0%	40	43	17	-3
Nov 21 – 28	WR Numero	1,412	±2.0%	21	47	32	-26
Sep	Pulse Asia			33	44	23	-11
Sep	SWS			39	44	17	-5
Jul 29 – Aug 6	WR Numero	1,814	±2.0%	35	32	33	+3
Jun 25 – 29	SWS	1,200	±3.0%	46	36	19	+10
Apr	SWS			38	48	14	-10
Mar 31 – Apr 7	WR Numero	1,894	±2.0%	29	42	29	-13
Mar 23 – 29	Pulse Asia	2,400	±2.0%	25	53	22	-28
Mar 15 – 20	Publicus Asia	1,500	±3.0%	19	57	24	-38
Feb 10-18	WR Numero	1,814	±2.0%	30	43	27	-13

=== 2024 ===
Fieldwork date(s)	Pollster	Sample size	MoE	Approve	Disapprove	Undecided/no opinion	Net
Dec 12 – 18	SWS	2,160	±2.0%	51	32	16	+17
Nov 29 – Dec 3	Publicus Asia	1,500	±3.0%	33	38	29	-5
Nov 26 – Dec 3	Pulse Asia	2,400	±2.0%	48	25	27	+23
Sep	SWS			58	26	15	+32
Sep 15 – 19	Publicus Asia	1,500	±3.0%	46	29	21	+17
Sep 6 – 13	Pulse Asia	2,400	±2.0%	50	21	29	+29
Sep 4 – 7	OCTA	1,200	±3.0%	66	12	23	+54
Jun 30 – Jul 5	OCTA	1,200	±3.0%	68	–	–	—
Jun 24 – Jul 1	SWS	1,500	±2.5%	62	22	16	+40
Jun 17–24	Pulse Asia	2,400	±2.0%	53	19	29	+34
Jun 15 – 19	Publicus Asia	1,507	±3.0%	44	–	–	—
Mar 6–10	Pulse Asia	1,200	±2.8%	55	20	25	+35

=== 2023 ===
Fieldwork date(s)	Pollster	Sample size	MoE	Approve	Disapprove	Undecided/no opinion	Net
Dec 8 – 11	SWS	1,200	±2.8%	65	18	17	+47
Sep	SWS			65	21	14	+44
Sep 10–14	Pulse Asia	1,200	±2.8%	65	10	25	+55
Jun 7–12	Publicus Asia	1,500	±3.0%	60	18	22	+42
Mar 24–28	OCTA	1,200	±3.0%	80	6	15	+74
Mar 15–19	Pulse Asia	1,200	±2.8%	78	5	16	+73

=== 2022 ===
Fieldwork date(s)	Pollster	Sample size	MoE	Approve	Disapprove	Undecided/no opinion	Net
Dec 10–14	SWS	1,500	±2.8%	75	7	21	+68
Nov 25–30	Publicus Asia	1,500	±3.0%	64	20	17	+44
Oct 23–27	OCTA	1,200	±3.0%	78	5	18	+73
Oct	SWS			71	8	18	+63

=== By pollster ===
==== Social Weather Stations ====
Year	Fieldwork date(s)	Sample size	MoE	Approve	Disapprove	Undecided/no opinion	Net
2026	Jun 20 – 29	1,200	±3.0%	38	45	17	-7
2026	Mar 24 – 31	1,500	±3.0%	33	49	18	-15
2025	Nov 24 – 30	1,200	±3.0%	40	43	17	-3
2025	Sep			39	44	17	-5
2025	Jun 25 – 29	1,200	±3.0%	46	36	19	+10
2025	Apr			38	48	14	-10
2024	Dec 12 – 18	2,160	±2.0%	51	32	16	+19
2024	Sep			58	26	15	+32
2024	Jun 24 – Jul 1	1,500	±2.5%	62	22	16	+40
2023	Dec 8 – 11	1,200	±2.8%	65	18	17	+47
2023	Sep			65	21	14	+44
2022	Dec 10–14	1,200	±2.8%	75	7	21	+68
2022	Oct			71	8	18	+63

==== Pulse Asia ====
Year	Fieldwork date(s)	Sample size	MoE	Approve	Disapprove	Undecided/no opinion	Net
2026	Jun 28 – Jul 3; Jul 6	2,400	±2.0%	29	50	21	-21
2026	Feb 27 – Mar 2	1,200	±2.8%	36	45	19	-9
2025	Dec 12 – 15	1,200	±2.8%	34	48	18	-14
2025	Sep			33	44	23	-11
2025	Mar 23 – 29	2,400	±2.0%	25	53	22	-28
2024	Nov 26 – Dec 3	2,400	±2.0%	48	25	27	+23
2024	Sep 6 – 13	2,400	±2.0%	50	21	29	+29
2024	Jun 17–24	2,400	±2.0%	53	19	29	+34
2024	Mar 6–10	1,200	±2.8%	55	20	25	+35
2023	Sep 10–14	1,200	±2.8%	65	10	25	+55
2023	Mar 15–19	1,200	±2.8%	78	5	16	+73

== Approval ratings of Sara Duterte ==
=== By pollster ===
==== Social Weather Stations ====
Year	Fieldwork date(s)	Sample size	MoE	Approve	Disapprove	Undecided/no opinion	Net
2026	Jun 20 – 29	1,200	±3.0%	58	26	16	+31
2026	Mar 24 – 31	1,500	±3.0%	54	25	21	+29
2025	Nov 24 – 30	1,200	±3.0%	54	26	18	+28
2025	Sep			52	30	17	+22
2025	Jun 25 – 29	1,200	±3.0%	55	27	17	+27
2025	Apr			56	27	16	+30
2025	Feb			51	33	16	+19
2025	Jan			48	34	16	+15
2024	Dec 12 – 18	2,160	±2.0%	52	31	16	+21
2024	Sep			57	30	13	+27
2024	Jun 23 – July 1	1,500	±2.5%	65	21	14	+44
2024	Mar			75	13	12	+63
2023	Dec 8 – 11	1,200	±2.8%	73	12	14	+61
2023	Sep			72	15	13	+57
2023	Jun			77	8	15	+69
2023	Mar			78	8	14	+71
2022	Dec 10 – 14	1,200	±2.8%	83	5	11	+77

== Trust ratings ==
=== 2026 ===
Fieldwork date(s)	Pollster	Sample size	MoE	Trust	Distrust	Undecided/no opinion	Net
Mar 19 – 25	OCTA	1,200	±3.0%	54	30	16	+24

=== 2025 ===
Fieldwork date(s)	Pollster	Sample size	MoE	Trust	Distrust	Undecided/no opinion	Net
Dec 16 – 20	OCTA	1,200	±3.0%	48	31	22	—
Nov 24 – 30	SWS	1,200	±3.0%	38	41	20	—
Sep 24 – 30	SWS	1,500	±3.0%	43	36	21	—
Jul 12 – 17	OCTA	1,200	±3.0%	62	20	16	—
Jun 25 – 29	SWS (Note: Commissioned by Stratbase Group)	1,200	±3.0%	48	30	21	—
May 6 – 9	Pulse Asia	1,200	±2.0%	32	42	27	—
Apr	Pulse Asia			29	45	25	—
Mar 23 – 29	Pulse Asia	2,400	±2.0%	25	54	21	—

=== 2023 ===
Fieldwork date(s)	Pollster	Sample size	MoE	Trust	Distrust	Undecided/no opinion	Net
Mar 24–28	OCTA	1,200	±3.0%	66	4	13	—
Mar 15–19	Pulse Asia	1,200	±2.8%	80	15	5	—

== See also ==
- Opinion polling for the 2022 Philippine presidential election
- Bongbong Marcos 2022 presidential campaign
- List of heads of the executive by approval rating
