= Opinion polling on the Nayib Bukele presidency =

Surveying on Salvadoran administration

Opinion polling has been conducted in El Salvador since September 2019, three months after Nayib Bukele took office as President of El Salvador on 1 June 2019, to gauge public opinion of Bukele and his government. Despite negative reception from outside of El Salvador, domestically, Bukele is considered to be one of the most popular presidents in Salvadoran history as his approval ratings generally hover around 90 percent.

== Presidential approval rating ==
Polling aggregates
- Nayib Bukele's presidential approval rating
- Approves
- Disapproves
- Unsure/No Opinion

Local regression of polls conducted

Polling firm	Fieldwork date	Sample size	Approves	Disapproves	Unsure	Lead	Ref.
Data Poll	26–29 Oct 2026	772	92.0	–	–	–	
CID Gallup	24–27 Oct 2026	600	94.0	–	–	–	
Data Poll	8–12 Jul 2026	1,780	94.0	4.0	2.0	90.0	
IUDOP	15–26 May 2026	1,271	87.8	–	–	–	
LPG Datos	15–23 May 2026	1,200	85.5	10.9	3.6	74.6	
CID Gallup	May 2026	–	93.0	3.0	4.0	90.0	
CID Gallup	15–21 Mar 2026	1,200	94.0	–	–	–	
Data Poll	14–18 Feb 2026	960	93.0	5.0	2.0	88.0	
CID Gallup	12–18 Feb 2026	1,200	93.0	–	–	–	
LPG Datos	19–25 Jan 2026	1,200	91.9	5.9	2.2	86.0	
IUDOP	Jan 2026	–	83.9	–	–	–	
CID Gallup	Dec 2025	1,200	90.0	5.0	5.0	85.0	
CID Gallup	Sept 2025	1,200	87.0	6.0	4.0	81.0	
LPG Datos	12–20 May 2025	1,518	85.2	10.8	4.0	74.4	
TResearch	Apr 2025	1,200	90.1	8.4	1.5	81.7	
CID Gallup	Nov 2024	1,200	91.0	6.0	3.0	85.0	
CID Gallup	Sept 2024	–	89.0	4.0	7.0	85.0	
CID Gallup	May 2024	–	92.0	6.0	2.0	86.0	
CID Gallup	Jan 2024	–	92.0	5.0	3.0	87.0	
CID Gallup	6–13 Nov 2023	1,200	92.0	6.0	2.0	86.0	
CID Gallup	Sept 2023	–	90.0	5.0	5.0	85.0	
TResearch	Jun 2023	1,000	92.9	5.3	1.8	87.6	
CID Gallup	May 2023	–	90.0	7.0	3.0	83.0	
TResearch	May 2023	1,000	91.5	7.2	1.3	84.3	
TResearch	Apr 2023	1,000	90.7	7.0	2.3	83.7	
TResearch	Mar 2023	1,000	89.2	9.2	1.6	80.0	
TResearch	Feb 2023	1,000	87.6	10.1	2.3	77.5	
LPG Datos	Feb 2023	1,500	91.0	6.9	2.1	84.1	
CID Gallup	16–27 Jan 2023	1,200	90.0	4.0	6.0	86.0	
TResearch	Jan 2023	1,000	84.8	11.5	3.7	73.3	
TResearch	Dec 2022	1,000	80.1	14.8	5.1	65.3	
LPG Datos	16–21 Nov 2022	–	87.8	9.5	2.5	78.3	
TResearch	Nov 2022	1,000	81.6	13.9	4.5	67.7	
TResearch	Oct 2022	1,000	83.7	12.0	4.3	71.7	
TResearch	Sept 2022	1,000	82.0	13.2	4.8	68.8	
TResearch	Aug 2022	1,000	83.8	8.1	8.1	75.7	
TResearch	Jul 2022	1,000	82.7	8.9	8.4	73.8	
TResearch	Jun 2022	1,000	80.7	10.9	8.4	69.8	
Funda Ungo	Jun 2022	–	89.0	6.7	4.3	82.3	
CIESCA	30 May 2022	1,338	91.6	3.2	5.2	88.4	
CID Gallup	26 Jan 2022	1,200	84.0	12.0	4.0	72.0	
Funda Ungo	Nov–Dec 2021	–	84.5	10.1	5.4	82.3	
LPG Datos	24–29 Nov 2021	1,520	85.1	11.7	3.2	73.4	
LPG Datos	18–24 Aug 2021	1,506	84.7	12.3	2.9	72.4	
CID Gallup	18 Aug 2021	1,200	87.0	11.0	2.0	76.0	
CIESCA	24 May 2021	–	94.0	6.0	0.0	88.0	
LPG Datos	13–22 May 2021	1,103	86.5	9.1	4.3	77.4	
CID Gallup	2–10 Mar 2021	1,200	96.0	3.0	1.0	93.0	
CID Gallup	25 Nov–10 Dec 2020	1,200	89.0	10.0	2.0	79.0	
Funda Ungo	Nov–Dec 2020	–	91.1	6.2	2.7	84.9	
CID Gallup	7–16 Nov 2020	1,200	96.0	–	–	–	
LPG Datos	11–22 May 2020	1,406	92.5	5.4	2.1	87.1	
LPG Datos	28 Feb 2020	–	85.9	10.4	3.7	75.5	
LPG Datos	10 Sept 2019	–	90.4	0.4	9.2	90.0	

== Polling on the gang crackdown ==
Polling firm	Fieldwork date	Sample size	Support	Oppose	Unsure	Lead	Ref.
CID Gallup	Sept 2024	–	83.0	12.0	5.0	71.0	
CID Gallup	Jan 2024	–	88.0	8.0	4.0	80.0	
CID Gallup	Sept 2023	–	84.0	12.0	4.0	72.0	
TResearch	Jun 2023	1,000	92.4	5.1	2.5	87.3	
TResearch	May 2023	1,000	91.2	6.5	2.3	84.7	
TResearch	May 2023	1,000	90.9	6.6	2.5	84.3	
CIESCA	May 2023	–	92.21	5.30	2.49	86.91	
TResearch	Apr 2023	1,000	89.4	8.2	2.4	81.2	
TResearch	Mar 2023	1,000	88.9	10.6	0.5	78.3	
Funda Ungo	1–6 Mar 2023	500	85.6	–	–	–	
TResearch	Feb 2023	1,000	85.2	12.2	2.6	83.0	
CID Gallup	Feb 2023	–	92.0	–	–	–	
TResearch	Jan 2023	1,000	82.1	13.9	4.0	68.2	
TResearch	Dec 2022	1,000	78.3	16.7	5.0	61.6	
TResearch	Nov 2022	1,000	79.1	15.9	5.0	63.2	
TResearch	Oct 2022	1,000	80.8	14.1	5.1	66.7	
TResearch	Sept 2022	1,000	79.7	15.2	5.1	64.5	
UCA	Sept 2022	–	75.9	–	–	–	
CID Gallup	5 Sept 2022	1,200	91.0	6.0	1.0	85.0	
TResearch	Aug 2022	1,000	83.5	13.9	2.6	69.6	
TResearch	Jul 2022	1,000	82.6	14.7	2.7	67.9	
TResearch	Jun 2022	1,000	74.6	16.3	9.1	58.3	
CIESCA	30 May 2022	1,338	90.1	7.1	2.8	83.03	

== 2024 re-election polling ==
Polling firm	Fieldwork date	Sample size	Would support	Would not support	Undecided	Lead	Ref.
Iudop-UCA	11–29 Nov 2023	1,512	69.9	24.3	5.8	45.6	
TResearch	Jun 2023	1,000	90.9	8.8	0.3	82.1	
CEC-UFG	27 May–1 Jun 2023	1,334	75.6	12.5	11.9	63.1	
CIESCA	May 2023	–	91.85	5.36	2.79	86.49	
TResearch	May 2023	1,000	90.4	9.3	0.3	81.1	
TResearch	Apr 2023	1,000	91.2	7.5	1.3	83.7	
TResearch	Mar 2023	1,000	92.6	6.2	1.2	86.4	
La Prensa Gráfica	15–24 Feb 2023	1,500	68.0	13.0	19.0	55.0	
TResearch	14–16 Feb 2023	1,000	93.9	5.7	0.4	88.2	
CEC-UFG	4–8 Feb 2023	1,263	62.2	19.0	18.8	43.2	
TResearch	Jan 2023	1,000	92.7	5.9	1.4	86.8	
TResearch	Dec 2022	1,000	93.7	4.8	1.5	88.9	
LPG Datos	16–21 Nov 2022	1,520	64.6	17.9	17.5	46.7	
TResearch	Nov 2022	1,000	94.1	4.5	1.4	89.6	
CEC-UFG	27–31 Oct 2022	1,227	74.7	12.8	12.5	61.9	
CEC-UFG	27–31 Oct 2022	1,227	77.2	11.0	11.8	66.2	
TResearch	Oct 2022	1,000	94.8	3.9	1.3	90.9	
TResearch	17–19 Sept 2022	1,000	94.3	4.4	1.4	89.9	
CIESCA	18 Sept 2022	25,623	88.3	11.7	–	76.6	
CEC-UFG	10–14 Sept 2022	1,231	58.9	23.1	15.0	35.8	
CEC-UFG	26 May 2022	–	72.2	–	–	–	

== See also ==
- Opinion polling for the 2024 Salvadoran general election
- List of heads of the executive by approval rating
