= Opinion polling on the Emmanuel Macron presidency =

Surveying on French administration since 2017

Opinion polling on the presidency of Emmanuel Macron has been regularly conducted by French pollsters since the start of his five-year term. Public opinion on various issues has also been tracked.

== Political barometers ==
The table below lists "political barometers" published by various polling organisations, which monitor the evolution of public opinion on the President of France, Prime Minister of France, as well as notable political personalities. IFOP–Fiducial publishes two polls each month: one on the popularity of the executive and the second on various political personalities, including Emmanuel Macron and the Prime Minister. Only the first is listed in the table below.

Though the composition of panels of respondents of every pollster are determined by the quota method as defined by the French National Institute of Statistics and Economic Studies, differences in methodology between each political barometer result in significant different results between pollsters. These differences range from the sample size, method of collecting respondents (with Kantar Sofres using face–to–face interviews, IFOP using phone interviews and BVA recruiting its panel by phone) and significant differences in question wording. According to Frédéric Dabi, director of the IFOP, the difference between the two political barometers produced by his institute–one conducted for Le Journal du Dimanche, the other for Paris Match and Sud Radio–is that the latter asks about the "action" of the executive, and is therefore a more "short–termist" political question, and as a result is significantly more volatile than the other survey.

=== Macron and Lecornu ===
Polling firm	Fieldwork date	Sample size	Emmanuel Macron				Sebastien Lecornu				Question wording
Polling firm	Fieldwork date	Sample size	Approve	Disapprove	No opinion	Net	Approve	Disapprove	No opinion	Net	Question wording
Ipsos	10-12 Dec 2025	1,000	18%	77%	5%	59%	29%	58%	13%	29%	(Note: What is your judgment on Emmanuel Macron's actions as President of the Republic? What is your judgment on Edouard Philippe's actions as Prime Minister? (Quel jugement portez-vous sur l'action d’Emmanuel Macron en tant que président de la République ? Quel jugement portez-vous sur l'action d’Edouard Philippe en tant que Premier ministre ?))
Ipsos	6–7 Nov 2025	1,000	19%	77%	4%	58%	25%	60%	15%	35%	
Ipsos	14–15 Oct 2025	1,000	20%	80%	0%	60%	42%	57%	1%	15%	

=== Macron and Bayrou ===
Polling firm	Fieldwork date	Sample size	Emmanuel Macron				François Bayrou				Question wording
Polling firm	Fieldwork date	Sample size	Approve	Disapprove	No opinion	Net	Approve	Disapprove	No opinion	Net	Question wording
BVA	19–20 Mar 2025	1,011	29%	71%	0%	42%	31%	68%	1%	37%	(Note: What is your opinion of ... (1) Emmanuel Macron as President of the Republic?; (2) Edouard Philippe as Prime Minister? (Quelle opinion avez-vous d’… (1) Emmanuel Macron en tant que président de la République ?; (2) Edouard Philippe en tant que Premier ministre ?))
Ifop	12–20 Mar 2025	2,000	24%	76%	0%	52%	27%	73%	0%	46%	
Ipsos	12–14 Mar 2025	1,000	27%	69%	4%	42%	25%	64%	11%	39%	
Elabe	11–12 Mar 2025	1,003	27%	68%	5%	41%	20%	68%	12%	48%	(Note: Do you trust or distrust the President of the Republic, Emmanuel Macron, to effectively tackle the main issues facing the country? Do you trust or distrust the Prime Minister, Edouard Philippe, to effectively tackle the main issues facing the country? (Faites-vous confiance ou pas confiance au Président de la République, Emmanuel MACRON, pour affronter efficacement les principaux problèmes qui se posent au pays ? Faites-vous confiance ou pas confiance au Premier ministre, Edouard PHILIPPE, pour affronter efficacement les principaux problèmes qui se posent au pays ?))
Harris Interactive	25–27 Feb 2025	1,058	37%	63%	–	26%	34%	66%	–	32%	(Note: Do you have complete trust, some trust, some distrust, or no trust at all in Emmanuel Macron / Edouard Philippe as President of the Republic / Prime Minister to implement good policies for France? (Faites-vous tout à fait confiance, plutôt confiance, plutôt pas confiance ou pas du tout confiance à Emmanuel Macron / Edouard Philippe en tant que Président de la République / Premier ministre pour mener une bonne politique pour la France ?))
Odoxa	19–20 Feb 2025	1,005	25%	75%	0%	50%	26%	72%	2%	46%	(Note: Would you say that Emmanuel Macron is a good President of the Republic? Would you say that Edouard Philippe is a good Prime Minister? (Diriez-vous qu’Emmanuel Macron est un bon Président de la République ? Diriez-vous qu’Edouard Philippe est un bon Premier ministre ?))
BVA	19–20 Feb 2025	1,000	27%	73%	0%	46%	36%	63%	1%	27%	
Ipsos	12–13 Feb 2025	1,000	22%	75%	3%	53%	27%	61%	12%	34%	
Elabe	11–12 Feb 2025	1,000	21%	71%	8%	50%	21%	64%	15%	43%	
Harris Interactive	28–30 Jan 2025	1,054	31%	69%	–	38%	36%	64%	–	28%	
Odoxa	23–24 Jan 2025	1,005	26%	73%	1%	47%	30%	68%	2%	38%	
Ifop	15–23 Jan 2025	2,001	21%	79%	0%	58%	34%	66%	0%	32%	
BVA	16–17 Jan 2025	1,003	26%	73%	1%	47%	37%	62%	1%	25%	
Ipsos	8–9 Jan 2025	1,000	21%	75%	4%	54%	20%	59%	21%	39%	
Elabe	7–8 Jan 2025	1,001	18%	76%	6%	58%	20%	67%	13%	47%	
Harris Interactive	24–26 Dec 2024	1,104	32%	68%	–	36%	32%	68%	–	36%	
Ifop	11–18 Dec 2024	2,004	24%	76%	0%	52%	34%	66%	0%	32%	
BVA	13–14 Dec 2024	1,003	24%	76%	0%	52%	40%	59%	1%	19%	

=== Macron and Barnier ===
Polling firm	Fieldwork date	Sample size	Emmanuel Macron				Michel Barnier				Question wording
Polling firm	Fieldwork date	Sample size	Approve	Disapprove	No opinion	Net	Approve	Disapprove	No opinion	Net	Question wording
Odoxa	11–12 Dec 2024	1,005	25%	74%	1%	49%	–	–	–	–	
Elabe	10–11 Dec 2024	1,000	21%	72%	7%	51%	–	–	–	–	
Harris Interactive	26–28 Nov 2024	1,051	33%	67%	–	34%	42%	58%	–	16%	
Odoxa	20–21 Nov 2024	1,005	23%	76%	1%	53%	42%	55%	3%	13%	
Ifop	13–21 Nov 2024	2,005	22%	78%	0%	56%	36%	64%	0%	28%	
Ipsos	6–7 Nov 2024	1,000	23%	73%	4%	50%	31%	52%	17%	21%	
BVA	6–7 Nov 2024	1,001	26%	74%	0%	48%	46%	52%	2%	6%	
Elabe	5–6 Nov 2024	1,001	21%	73%	6%	52%	27%	58%	15%	31%	
Odoxa	23–24 Oct 2024	1,005	25%	75%	0%	50%	37%	62%	1%	25%	
Harris Interactive	22–24 Oct 2024	1,020	35%	65%	–	30%	39%	61%	–	22%	
Ifop	9–17 Oct 2024	2,008	22%	78%	0%	56%	40%	60%	0%	20%	
Ipsos	9–10 Oct 2024	1,000	25%	71%	4%	46%	33%	46%	21%	13%	
BVA	1–2 Oct 2024	1,001	26%	74%	0%	48%	52%	47%	1%	5%	
Elabe	1–2 Oct 2024	1,007	22%	72%	6%	50%	28%	54%	18%	26%	
Harris Interactive	24–26 Sep 2024	1,039	37%	63%	–	26%	44%	56%	–	12%	
Ifop	11–20 Sep 2024	2,098	25%	75%	0%	50%	45%	55%	0%	10%	
Odoxa	18–19 Sep 2024	1,005	25%	75%	0%	50%	39%	59%	2%	20%	
Ipsos	11–13 Sep 2024	1,000	30%	66%	4%	36%	34%	33%	33%	1%	
Elabe	10–11 Sep 2024	1,000	25%	71%	4%	46%	31%	48%	21%	17%	

=== Macron and Attal ===
Polling firm	Fieldwork date	Sample size	Emmanuel Macron				Gabriel Attal				Question wording
Polling firm	Fieldwork date	Sample size	Approve	Disapprove	No opinion	Net	Approve	Disapprove	No opinion	Net	Question wording
BVA	28–29 Aug 2024	1,002	29%	71%	0%	42%	–	–	–	–	
Harris Interactive	27–29 Aug 2024	1,034	36%	64%	–	28%	45%	55%	–	10%	
Elabe	30–31 Jul 2024	1,004	27%	68%	5%	41%	33%	57%	10%	24%	
Harris Interactive	23–25 Jul 2024	1,005	37%	63%	–	26%	45%	55%	–	10%	
Elabe	10–11 Jul 2024	1,002	25%	69%	6%	44%	31%	59%	10%	28%	
Harris Interactive	25-27 Jun 2024	1,019	36%	64%	0%	28%	43%	57%	0%	14%	
BVA	19-20 Jun 2024	1,003	26%	74%	0%	48%	46%	53%	1%	7%	
Ipsos	19-20 Jun 2024	1,000	28%	68%	4%	40%	40%	53%	7%	13%	
Odoxa	19-20 Jun 2024	1,002	27%	72%	1%	45%	42%	56%	2%	14%	
Ifop	12-20 Jun 2024	1,992	26%	74%	0%	48%	41%	59%	0%	18%	(Note: Are you satisfied or dissatisfied with Emmanuel Macron as President of the Republic? Are you satisfied or dissatisfied with Edouard Philippe as Prime Minister? (Êtes-vous satisfait ou mécontent d’Emmanuel Macron comme Président de la République ? Êtes-vous satisfait ou mécontent d’Edouard Philippe comme Premier ministre ?))
Elabe	11-12 Jun 2024	1,502	24%	69%	7%	45%	29%	60%	11%	31%	
Harris Interactive	28-30 May 2024	1,016	42%	58%	0%	16%	43%	57%	0%	14%	
Odoxa	23-24 May 2024	991	33%	66%	1%	33%	44%	54%	2%	10%	
BVA	15-16 May 2024	1,500	32%	68%	0%	36%	49%	51%	0%	2%	
Ipsos	15-16 May 2024	1,000	32%	63%	5%	31%	39%	51%	10%	12%	
Ifop	6-16 May 2024	1,982	31%	69%	0%	38%	45%	55%	0%	10%	
Elabe	30 Apr-2 May 2024	1,000	29%	65%	6%	36%	33%	57%	10%	24%	
Odoxa	25-26 Apr 2024	1,005	31%	67%	2%	36%	44%	55%	1%	11%	
Harris Interactive	23-25 Apr 2024	1,051	38%	62%	0%	24%	42%	58%	0%	16%	
BVA	17-18 Apr 2024	1,001	33%	67%	0%	34%	50%	50%	0%	0%	
Ipsos	17-18 Apr 2024	1,000	29%	65%	6%	36%	34%	55%	11%	21%	
Ifop–Fiducial	3-4 Apr 2024	1,028	30%	70%	0%	40%	42%	58%	0%	16%	(Note: Do you approve or do you not approve of Emmanuel Macron's actions as President of the Republic? Do you approve or do you not approve of Edouard Philippe's actions as Prime Minister? (Approuvez-vous ou n’approuvez-vous pas l’action d’Emmanuel Macron comme Président de la République ? Approuvez-vous ou n’approuvez-vous pas l’action d’Edouard Philippe comme Premier ministre ?))
Elabe	2-3 Apr 2024	1,005	25%	68%	7%	43%	32%	58%	10%	26%	
Harris Interactive	26-28 Mar 2024	1,067	36%	64%	0%	28%	43%	57%	0%	14%	
Odoxa	19-20 Mar 2024	1,005	31%	69%	0%	38%	42%	57%	1%	15%	
Ipsos	13-15 Mar 2024	1,000	29%	67%	4%	38%	38%	50%	12%	12%	
BVA	13-14 Mar 2024	1,000	33%	67%	0%	34%	49%	50%	1%	1%	
Ifop	6-14 Mar 2024	2,017	28%	72%	0%	44%	45%	55%	0%	10%	
Elabe	5-6 Mar 2024	1,000	27%	68%	5%	41%	32%	60%	8%	28%	
Ifop–Fiducial	29 Feb-1 Mar 2024	1,213	31%	69%	0%	38%	47%	53%	0%	6%	
Odoxa	21-22 Feb 2024	1,005	32%	67%	1%	35%	43%	56%	1%	13%	
Harris Interactive	20-22 Feb 2024	1,099	41%	59%	0%	18%	48%	52%	0%	4%	
Ipsos	13-15 Feb 2024	1,000	30%	65%	5%	35%	40%	45%	15%	5%	
Ifop	7-15 Feb 2024	1,993	29%	71%	0%	42%	48%	52%	0%	4%	
BVA	7-8 Feb 2024	1,000	28%	71%	1%	43%	50%	49%	1%	1%	
Elabe	30-31 Jan 2024	1,001	25%	69%	6%	44%	32%	57%	11%	25%	
Harris Interactive	23-25 Jan 2024	1,137	39%	61%	0%	22%	47%	53%	0%	6%	
Odoxa	23-24 Jan 2024	1,005	32%	67%	1%	35%	48%	51%	1%	3%	
Ifop	12-18 Jan 2024	1,937	31%	68%	1%	37%	49%	46%	5%	3%	
Ipsos	17-19 Jan 2024	1,000	30%	65%	5%	35%	37%	37%	26%	0%	
BVA	9-10 Jan 2024	1,000	32%	68%	0%	36%	58%	41%	1%	17%	

=== Macron and Borne ===
Polling firm	Fieldwork date	Sample size	Emmanuel Macron				Élisabeth Borne				Question wording
Polling firm	Fieldwork date	Sample size	Approve	Disapprove	No opinion	Net	Approve	Disapprove	No opinion	Net	Question wording
Elabe	2-3 Jan 2024	1,002	27%	66%	7%	39%	23%	67%	10%	44%	
Harris Interactive	19-21 Dec 2023	1,021	40%	60%	0%	20%	34%	66%	0%	32%	
Ifop	7-15 Dec 2023	1942	32%	68%	0%	36%	28%	72%	0%	44%	
Odoxa	13-14 Dec 2023	1,004	33%	66%	1%	33%	29%	70%	1%	41%	
BVA	12-13 Dec 2023	1,000	32%	68%	0%	36%	30%	70%	0%	40%	
Ipsos	8-9 Dec 2023	1500	27%	68%	5%	41%	24%	69%	7%	45%	
Elabe	5-6 Dec 2023	1,086	28%	68%	4%	40%	26%	67%	7%	41%	
Harris Interactive	21-23 Nov 2023	1,124	42%	58%	0%	16%	38%	62%	0%	24%	
Odoxa	22 Nov 2023	1,005	35%	65%	0%	30%	30%	69%	1%	39%	
BVA	15-16 Nov 2023	1,001	34%	66%	0%	32%	32%	67%	1%	35%	
Ifop	9-16 Nov 2023	1931	33%	66%	1%	33%	30%	68%	2%	38%	
Ipsos	9-10 Nov 2023	1500	28%	66%	6%	38%	24%	68%	8%	44%	
Elabe	30-31 Oct 2023	1,001	27%	67%	6%	40%	23%	66%	11%	43%	
Harris Interactive	24-26 Oct 2023	1,110	43%	57%	0%	14%	35%	65%	0%	30%	
Odoxa	25 Oct 2023	1,005	34%	66%	0%	32%	30%	68%	2%	38%	
BVA	18-19 Oct 2023	1,004	32%	68%	0%	36%	31%	68%	1%	37%	
Ifop	12-19 Oct 2023	1933	29%	70%	1%	41%	28%	69%	3%	41%	
Ipsos	6-7 Oct 2023	1000	30%	65%	5%	35%	25%	68%	7%	43%	
Elabe	3-4 Oct 2023	1,001	27%	68%	5%	41%	23%	68%	9%	45%	
Harris Interactive	26–28 Sep 2023	1,164	39%	61%	0%	22%	35%	65%	0%	30%	
BVA	20-21 Sep 2023	1,001	31%	68%	1%	37%	28%	71%	1%	43%	
Odoxa	20-21 Sep 2023	1,005	32%	68%	0%	36%	31%	68%	1%	37%	
Ifop	14-21 Sep 2023	1935	28%	71%	1%	43%	29%	69%	2%	40%	
Ipsos	8-9 Sep 2023	1000	31%	64%	5%	33%	28%	65%	7%	37%	
Elabe	5-6 Sep 2023	1,000	28%	66%	6%	38%	24%	66%	10%	42%	
BVA	30-31 Aug 2023	1,000	32%	68%	0%	36%	33%	67%	0%	34%	
Harris Interactive	22–24 Aug 2023	1,024	39%	61%	0%	22%	37%	63%	0%	26%	
Ifop	22–23 Aug 2023	987	30%	70%	0%	40%	32%	68%	0%	36%	
Elabe	31 Jul–2 Aug 2023	1,001	29%	65%	6%	36%	26%	65%	9%	39%	
Harris Interactive	25–27 Jul 2023	1,043	42%	58%	0%	16%	36%	64%	0%	28%	
Ipsos	7-8 Jul 2023	1000	29%	66%	5%	37%	26%	67%	7%	41%	
BVA	4-5 Jul 2023	1,002	31%	68%	1%	37%	33%	66%	1%	33%	
Ifop–Fiducial	29-30 Jun 2023	1,005	33%	66%	1%	33%	30%	69%	1%	39%	
Harris Interactive	27–29 Jun 2023	1,055	40%	60%	0%	20%	35%	65%	0%	30%	
Elabe	27–28 Jun 2023	1,004	29%	65%	6%	36%	25%	66%	9%	41%	
Odoxa	21-22 Jun 2023	1,005	32%	67%	1%	35%	28%	70%	2%	42%	
Ifop	16–22 Jun 2023	1,969	30%	68%	2%	38%	30%	67%	3%	37%	
BVA	14-15 Jun 2023	1,000	31%	68%	1%	37%	30%	68%	2%	38%	
Elabe	30–31 May 2023	1,001	29%	64%	7%	35%	24%	63%	13%	39%	
BVA	24–25 May 2023	1,002	32%	67%	1%	35%	32%	67%	1%	35%	
Harris Interactive	23–25 May 2023	1,109	39%	61%	0%	22%	34%	66%	0%	32%	
Ifop	16–25 May 2023	1,937	28%	71%	1%	43%	28%	69%	3%	41%	
Ipsos	May 2023	–	30%	67%	3%	37%	27%	68%	5%	41%	
Odoxa	22–23 May 2023	1,005	31%	68%	1%	37%	28%	70%	2%	42%	
Elabe	2–3 May 2023	1,000	25%	70%	5%	45%	22%	69%	9%	47%	
Harris Interactive	25–27 Apr 2023	1,078	39%	61%	0%	22%	35%	65%	0%	30%	
Ifop	14–21 Apr 2023	1,955	26%	72%	2%	46%	27%	70%	3%	43%	
Odoxa	19–20 Apr 2023	1,005	30%	70%	0%	40%	28%	69%	3%	41%	
BVA	18–19 Apr 2023	1,002	26%	73%	1%	47%	27%	73%	0%	46%	
Ipsos	7–8 Apr 2023	1,003	28%	69%	3%	41%	23%	72%	5%	49%	
Elabe	3–5 Apr 2023	1,000	25%	71%	4%	46%	22%	69%	9%	47%	
Harris Interactive	28–30 Mar 2023	1,062	39%	61%	0%	22%	31%	69%	0%	38%	
BVA	24–25 Mar 2023	1,000	28%	72%	0%	44%	28%	71%	1%	43%	
Odoxa	22–23 Mar 2023	1,004	30%	70%	0%	40%	28%	70%	2%	42%	
Ifop	9–16 Mar 2023	1,928	28%	70%	2%	42%	29%	67%	4%	38%	
Elabe	28 Feb–1 Mar 2023	1,003	32%	63%	6%	31%	26%	63%	11%	37%	
Ipsos	24–25 Feb 2023	1,014	32%	64%	4%	32%	27%	67%	6%	40%	
BVA	22–23 Feb 2023	1,001	34%	66%	0%	32%	30%	69%	1%	39%	
Harris Interactive	21–23 Feb 2023	1,008	42%	58%	0%	16%	37%	63%	0%	26%	
Odoxa	21–22 Feb 2023	1,005	36%	63%	1%	27%	31%	66%	3%	35%	
Ifop	9–16 Feb 2023	1,952	32%	66%	2%	34%	29%	66%	5%	37%	
Ifop–Fiducial	1–2 Feb 2023	1,012	34%	66%	0%	32%	31%	69%	0%	38%	
Elabe	31 Jan–1 Feb 2023	1,001	30%	64%	6%	34%	23%	66%	11%	43%	
Odoxa	25–26 Jan 2023	1,004	36%	64%	0%	28%	29%	69%	2%	40%	
Harris Interactive	24–26 Jan 2023	1,017	43%	57%	0%	14%	38%	62%	0%	24%	
BVA	20–21 Jan 2023	1,000	36%	64%	0%	28%	34%	65%	1%	31%	
Ifop	12–19 Jan 2023	1,963	34%	65%	1%	31%	32%	64%	4%	32%	
Ipsos	13–14 Jan 2023	1,003	38%	58%	4%	20%	34%	58%	8%	24%	
Ifop–Fiducial	11–12 Jan 2023	1,017	38%	62%	0%	24%	37%	50%	13%	13%	
Elabe	3–4 Jan 2023	1,005	32%	62%	6%	30%	27%	59%	14%	32%	
Harris Interactive	20–22 Déc 2022	1,016	46%	54%	0%	8%	42%	58%	0%	16%	
Ifop	9–16 Dec 2022	1,956	36%	62%	2%	26%	36%	59%	5%	23%	
BVA	13-14 Dec 2022	1,003	36%	64%	0%	28%	38%	61%	1%	23%	
Odoxa	12-13 Dec 2022	1,005	41%	59%	0%	18%	36%	63%	1%	27%	
Ipsos	9–10 Dec 2023	1,013	38%	57%	5%	19%	34%	57%	9%	20%	
Odoxa	23-24 Nov 2022	1,005	38%	62%	0%	24%	36%	62%	2%	26%	
Harris Interactive	22–24 Nov 2022	1,007	44%	56%	0%	12%	42%	58%	0%	16%	
BVA	16-17 Nov 2022	1,000	40%	60%	0%	20%	42%	58%	0%	16%	
Ifop	10–17 Nov 2022	1,953	35%	62%	3%	27%	36%	55%	9%	19%	
Ipsos	11–12 Nov 2022	1,017	36%	59%	5%	23%	32%	59%	9%	27%	
Odoxa	19-20 Oct 2022	1,005	38%	62%	0%	24%	35%	63%	2%	28%	
BVA	19-20 Oct 2022	1,001	36%	63%	1%	27%	41%	58%	1%	17%	
Ifop	13–20 Oct 2022	1,954	35%	63%	2%	28%	38%	56%	6%	18%	
Ipsos	14–15 Oct 2022	1,010	39%	58%	3%	19%	35%	54%	11%	19%	
Odoxa	21-22 Sep 2022	1,005	41%	59%	0%	18%	41%	57%	2%	16%	
Ifop	15–22 Sept 2022	1,946	38%	60%	2%	22%	43%	50%	7%	7%	
BVA	21-22 Sep 2022	1,000	43%	57%	0%	14%	51%	48%	1%	3%	
Ipsos	9-10 Sep 2022	1,001	43%	53%	4%	10%	35%	48%	17%	13%	
BVA	24-25 Aug 2022	1,000	42%	58%	0%	16%	46%	53%	1%	7%	
Ifop	17–18 Aug 2022	986	37%	63%	0%	25%	41%	54%	5%	13%	
Ifop	21–22 July 2022	1,017	38%	62%	0%	24%	38%	54%	8%	16%	
BVA	19-21 July 2022	1,000	43%	57%	0%	14%	49%	50%	1%	1%	
Ipsos	Jul 2022	–	41%	55%	4%	14%	30%	45%	25%	15%	
Odoxa	22–23 June 2022	1,005	38%	62%	0%	34%	33%	65%	2%	32%	
BVA	22-23 June 2022	1,000	38%	61%	1%	23%	41%	57%	2%	16%	
Ifop	16–23 June 2022	1,000	38%	61%	1%	23%	37%	52%	11%	15%	
Odoxa	24-25 May 2022	1,005	44%	56%	0%	12%	43%	55%	2%	12%	
Ifop	17–25 May 2022	1,946	41%	58%	1%	17%	45%	43%	12%	2%	
BVA	18-19 May 2022	1,002	42%	57%	1%	15%	50%	49%	1%	1%	
Ipsos	May 2022	–	42%	54%	4%	12%	27%	39%	34%	12%	

=== Macron and Castex ===
Polling firm	Fieldwork date	Sample size	Emmanuel Macron				Jean Castex				Question wording
Polling firm	Fieldwork date	Sample size	Approve	Disapprove	No opinion	Net	Approve	Disapprove	No opinion	Net	Question wording
BVA	27-28 Apr 2022	1,005	42%	58%	0%	16%	43%	56%	1%	13%	
Odoxa	13-14 Apr 2022	1,005	40%	59%	1%	19%	35%	63%	2%	28%	
Ifop	7–14 Apr 2022	1,913	41%	58%	1%	17%	41%	55%	4%	14%	
Odoxa	23-24 Mar 2022	1,005	46%	54%	0%	22%	39%	58%	3%	19%	
BVA	21–22 Mar 2022	1,004	46%	54%	0%	12%	42%	58%	0%	15%	
Ifop	10–17 Mar 2022	1,925	42%	56%	2%	14%	39%	57%	4%	18%	
Ipsos	Mar 2022	–	47%	49%	4%	2%	–	–	–	–	
BVA	23–24 Feb 2022	1,000	42%	58%	0%	16%	39%	61%	0%	22%	
Harris Interactive	22–24 Feb 2022	1,055	51%	49%	0%	2%	44%	56%	0%	12%	
Ifop	9–17 Feb 2022	1 936	39%	59%	2%	20%	36%	61%	3%	25%	
Odoxa	15–16 Feb 2022	1,005	41%	57%	2%	16%	38%	60%	2%	22%	
Ipsos	11–12 Feb 2022	1,000	43%	54%	3%	11%	38%	58%	4%	20%	
Elabe	31–2 Feb 2022	1,482	35%	60%	5%	25%	30%	61%	9%	31%	
Ifop–Fiducial	27–28 Jan 2022	1,021	40%	60%	0%	20%	39%	61%	0%	22%	
Harris Interactive	25–27 Jan 2022	1,044	51%	49%	0%	2%	44%	56%	0%	12%	
Odoxa	19–20 Jan 2022	1,005	39%	61%	0%	22%	36%	63%	1%	27%	
BVA	19–20 Jan 2022	1,000	38%	62%	0%	24%	36%	63%	1%	27%	
Ifop	14–20 Jan 2022	1 952	37%	60%	3%	23%	34%	62%	4%	28%	
Elabe	10–11 Jan 2022	1,465	32%	63%	5%	31%	28%	64%	8%	36%	
Ipsos	7–8 Jan 2022	1,000	40%	56%	4%	16%	38%	56%	6%	18%	
Ifop–Fiducial	6–7 Jan 2022	1,008	43%	57%	0%	14%	42%	58%	0%	16%	
Harris Interactive	21–23 Dec 2021	1,211	51%	49%	0%	2%	46%	54%	0%	8%	
BVA	15–16 Dec 2021	1,000	44%	56%	0%	12%	43%	56%	1%	13%	
Ifop	9–16 Dec 2021	1 947	41%	55%	4%	14%	40%	54%	6%	14%	
Ipsos	10–11 Dec 2021	1,000	41%	52%	7%	11%	38%	54%	8%	16%	
Odoxa	7–8 Dec 2021	1,005	44%	56%	0%	12%	42%	58%	2%	16%	
Elabe	6–7 Dec 2021	1,480	36%	58%	6%	22%	28%	62%	10%	34%	
Ifop–Fiducial	25–26 Nov 2021	1,012	43%	57%	0%	14%	41%	59%	0%	18%	
BVA	24–25 Nov 2021	1,001	42%	58%	0%	16%	40%	59%	1%	19%	
Harris Interactive	23–25 Nov 2021	1,078	51%	49%	0%	2%	47%	53%	0%	6%	
Odoxa	17–18 Nov 2021	1,005	44%	56%	0%	12%	41%	58%	1%	17%	
Ifop	8–18 Nov 2021	1 891	40%	57%	3%	17%	38%	57%	5%	19%	
Ipsos	12–13 Nov 2021	1,000	44%	51%	5%	7%	38%	56%	6%	18%	
Elabe	2–3 Nov 2021	1,001	34%	60%	6%	26%	28%	63%	9%	35%	
Ifop–Fiducial	28–29 Oct 2021	1,007	39%	61%	0%	22%	37%	63%	0%	26%	
Harris Interactive	26–28 Oct 2021	1,052	48%	52%	0%	4%	44%	56%	0%	12%	
Odoxa	20–21 Oct 2021	1,005	40%	60%	0%	20%	37%	62%	1%	25%	
BVA	20–21 Oct 2021	1,007	42%	58%	0%	16%	39%	60%	1%	21%	
Ifop	7–15 Oct 2021	1 887	40%	58%	2%	18%	38%	59%	3%	21%	
Ipsos	8–9 Oct 2021	1,000	40%	56%	4%	16%	34%	60%	6%	26%	
Elabe	5–6 Oct 2021	1,309	35%	58%	7%	23%	30%	60%	10%	30%	
Ifop–Fiducial	30 Sep–1 Oct 2021	1,018	39%	61%	0%	22%	38%	62%	0%	24%	
Harris Interactive	28–30 Sep 2021	1,082	50%	50%	0%	0%	46%	54%	0%	8%	
Odoxa	22–23 Sep 2021	1,005	42%	58%	0%	16%	40%	59%	1%	19%	
BVA	22–23 Sep 2021	1,000	46%	53%	1%	7%	45%	54%	1%	9%	
Ifop	9–16 Sep 2021	1 932	38%	59%	3%	21%	36%	58%	6%	22%	
Ipsos	3–4 Sep 2021	1,000	40%	53%	7%	13%	33%	58%	9%	25%	
Elabe	31 Aug–1 Sep 2021	1,000	37%	57%	6%	20%	30%	58%	12%	28%	
Ifop–Fiducial	26–27 Aug 2021	1,074	38%	62%	0%	24%	38%	62%	0%	24%	
BVA	25–26 Aug 2021	1,003	40%	60%	0%	20%	40%	60%	0%	20%	
Harris Interactive	24–26 Aug 2021	1,054	48%	52%	0%	4%	43%	57%	0%	14%	
Ifop	19–20 Aug 2021	992	41%	59%	0%	18%	40%	60%	0%	20%	
Harris Interactive	26–27 Jul 2021	1,044	47%	53%	0%	6%	43%	57%	0%	14%	
Odoxa	15–16 Jul 2021	1,005	39%	61%	0%	22%	38%	61%	1%	23%	
Ifop	13–15 Jul 2021	984	38%	62%	0%	24%	40%	60%	0%	20%	
Ipsos	9–10 Jul 2021	1,000	39%	55%	6%	16%	35%	57%	8%	22%	
Elabe	6–7 Jul 2021	1,003	36%	59%	5%	23%	29%	61%	10%	32%	
BVA	30 Jun–1 Jul 2021	1,004	39%	60%	1%	21%	42%	57%	1%	15%	
YouGov	29–30 Jun 2021	1,081	31%	59%	10%	28%	29%	57%	13%	28%	(Note: What is your judgment on Emmanuel Macron's actions as President of the Republic? What is your judgment on Edouard Philippe's actions as Prime Minister? (Quel jugement portez-vous sur l’action d'Emmanuel Macron comme Président de la République ? Quel jugement portez-vous sur l’action d'Edouard Philippe comme Premier Ministre ?))
Ifop–Fiducial	24–25 Jun 2021	1,006	41%	59%	0%	18%	40%	60%	0%	20%	
Odoxa	23–24 Jun 2021	1,005	41%	58%	1%	17%	40%	59%	1%	19%	
Harris Interactive	22–24 Jun 2021	1,050	50%	50%	0%	0%	41%	59%	0%	18%	
Ifop	03–10 June 2021	1,933	40%	58%	2%	18%	38%	57%	5%	19%	
Elabe	1–2 Jun 2021	1,002	36%	58%	6%	22%	30%	60%	10%	30%	
YouGov	21 May–1 Jun 2021	1,003	30%	61%	9%	31%	31%	57%	12%	26%	
Ipsos	28–29 May 2021	1,000	40%	57%	3%	17%	35%	59%	6%	24%	
Ifop–Fiducial	27–28 May 2021	1,015	41%	59%	0%	18%	39%	60%	1%	21%	
Harris Interactive	25–27 May 2021	1,025	48%	52%	0%	4%	40%	60%	0%	20%	
Odoxa	20–21 May 2021	1,005	41%	58%	1%	17%	35%	63%	2%	28%	
BVA	19–20 May 2021	1,004	42%	58%	0%	16%	42%	58%	0%	16%	
Ifop	12–20 May 2021	1,928	40%	58%	2%	18%	38%	58%	4%	20%	
Elabe	4–5 May 2021	1,000	33%	62%	5%	29%	27%	66%	7%	39%	
YouGov	3-4 May 2021	1,001	31%	62%	7%	31%	27%	62%	12%	35%	
Ifop–Fiducial	28–29 Apr 2021	1,011	41%	59%	0%	18%	41%	59%	0%	18%	
Harris Interactive	27–29 Apr 2021	1,041	46%	54%	0%	8%	40%	60%	0%	20%	
Odoxa	21–22 Apr 2021	1,005	38%	61%	1%	23%	35%	65%	0%	30%	
BVA	21–22 Apr 2021	1,002	39%	60%	1%	21%	36%	63%	1%	27%	
Ifop	8–15 Apr 2021	1,940	37%	60%	3%	23%	34%	61%	5%	27%	
Ipsos	9–10 Apr 2021	1,002	37%	58%	5%	21%	32%	62%	6%	30%	
Elabe	6–7 Apr 2021	1,003	33%	63%	4%	30%	26%	66%	8%	40%	
YouGov	29-30 Mar 2021	1,068	30%	61%	9%	31%	25%	64%	11%	39%	
Ifop–Fiducial	25–26 Mar 2021	1,011	39%	61%	0%	22%	36%	64%	0%	28%	
Odoxa	24–25 Mar 2021	1,005	39%	61%	0%	22%	34%	65%	1%	31%	
Harris Interactive	23–25 Mar 2021	1,023	46%	54%	0%	8%	40%	60%	0%	20%	
BVA	17–18 Mar 2021	1,001	39%	61%	0%	22%	40%	60%	0%	20%	
Ifop	11–18 Mar 2021	1,911	37%	60%	3%	23%	36%	60%	4%	24%	
Ipsos	5–6 Mar 2021	1,000	41%	53%	6%	12%	36%	56%	8%	20%	
Elabe	2–3 Mar 2021	1,003	34%	60%	6%	26%	30%	62%	8%	32%	
YouGov	1-2 Mar 2021	1,084	33%	58%	9%	25%	27%	61%	12%	34%	
Ifop–Fiducial	25–26 Feb 2021	1,004	41%	58%	1%	17%	39%	60%	1%	21%	
Harris Interactive	23–25 Feb 2021	1,037	48%	52%	0%	4%	42%	58%	0%	16%	
Odoxa	17–18 Feb 2021	1,005	41%	59%	0%	18%	36%	63%	1%	27%	
BVA	17–18 Feb 2021	1,003	42%	58%	0%	16%	42%	58%	0%	16%	
Ifop	11–18 Feb 2021	1,954	41%	56%	3%	15%	37%	58%	5%	21%	
Ifop–Fiducial	4–5 Feb 2021	1,004	41%	59%	0%	18%	38%	62%	0%	24%	
Elabe	2–3 Feb 2021	1,001	36%	60%	4%	24%	28%	64%	8%	36%	
YouGov	1-2 Feb 2021	1,013	34%	59%	8%	25%	27%	61%	12%	34%	
Harris Interactive	26–28 Jan 2021	1,017	45%	55%	0%	10%	41%	59%	0%	18%	
Ipsos	22–23 Jan 2021	1,000	35%	60%	3%	25%	32%	61%	7%	29%	
BVA	20–21 Jan 2021	1,002	37%	63%	0%	26%	36%	64%	0%	28%	
Ifop	15–21 Jan 2021	1,913	40%	58%	2%	18%	37%	58%	5%	21%	
Odoxa	13–14 Jan 2021	1,003	40%	60%	0%	20%	35%	64%	1%	29%	
Ifop–Fiducial	7–8 Jan 2021	1,028	45%	55%	0%	10%	41%	59%	0%	18%	
Elabe	5–6 Jan 2021	1,001	35%	61%	4%	26%	25%	67%	8%	42%	
YouGov	5-6 Jan 2021	1,061	32%	61%	8%	29%	25%	62%	13%	37%	
Harris Interactive	22–24 Dec 2020	1,000	49%	51%	0%	2%	41%	59%	0%	18%	
BVA	16–17 Dec 2020	1,005	40%	60%	0%	20%	38%	61%	1%	23%	
Ifop	9–17 Dec 2020	1,936	38%	60%	2%	22%	37%	59%	4%	22%	
Ipsos	11–12 Dec 2020	1,000	38%	57%	5%	19%	36%	57%	7%	21%	
Odoxa	10–11 Dec 2020	990	42%	58%	0%	16%	37%	61%	2%	24%	
Elabe	1–2 Dec 2020	1,000	32%	64%	4%	32%	23%	69%	8%	46%	
YouGov	30 Nov–1 Dec 2020	1,008	32%	61%	7%	29%	25%	60%	15%	35%	
Ifop–Fiducial	26–27 Nov 2020	1,028	41%	59%	0%	18%	40%	60%	0%	20%	
Harris Interactive	24–26 Nov 2020	970	49%	51%	0%	2%	43%	57%	0%	14%	
BVA	18–19 Nov 2020	921	42%	58%	0%	16%	40%	59%	1%	19%	
Ifop	12–19 Nov 2020	1,924	41%	57%	2%	16%	39%	56%	5%	17%	
Ipsos	13–14 Nov 2020	1,000	37%	58%	5%	21%	31%	60%	9%	29%	
Odoxa	10–11 Nov 2020	1,005	43%	57%	0%	14%	35%	63%	2%	28%	
Elabe	3–4 Nov 2020	1,003	35%	61%	4%	26%	26%	63%	11%	37%	
YouGov	2-3 Nov 2020	1,004	34%	58%	8%	24%	29%	57%	14%	28%	
Ifop–Fiducial	29–30 Oct 2020	1,028	46%	54%	0%	8%	47%	53%	0%	7%	
Harris Interactive	27–29 Oct 2020	961	46%	54%	0%	8%	43%	57%	0%	14%	
Odoxa	21–22 Oct 2020	1,001	41%	58%	1%	17%	37%	60%	3%	23%	
BVA	21–22 Oct 2020	1,002	42%	57%	1%	15%	45%	54%	1%	9%	
Ifop	9–15 Oct 2020	1,937	38%	60%	2%	22%	39%	52%	9%	13%	
Ipsos	9–10 Oct 2020	1,000	40%	54%	6%	14%	35%	49%	16%	14%	
Elabe	6–7 Oct 2020	1,000	32%	63%	5%	31%	28%	58%	13%	30%	
YouGov	28-29 Sep 2020	1,034	29%	63%	8%	24%	27%	48%	26%	21%	
Harris Interactive	22–24 Sep 2020	994	45%	55%	0%	10%	46%	54%	0%	8%	
Ifop–Fiducial	23–25 Sep 2020	1,004	38%	62%	0%	24%	46%	54%	0%	8%	
BVA	23–24 Sep 2020	1,001	38%	62%	0%	24%	48%	51%	1%	3%	
Odoxa	22–23 Sep 2020	1,005	38%	62%	0%	24%	40%	59%	1%	19%	
Ifop	11–19 Sep 2020	1,906	38%	62%	0%	24%	45%	46%	9%	1%	
Elabe	8–9 Sep 2020	1,001	35%	57%	8%	22%	32%	51%	17%	19%	
Ipsos	4–5 Sep 2020	1,000	40%	55%	5%	15%	37%	41%	22%	4%	
YouGov	31 Aug-1 Sep 2020	1,024	31%	61%	8%	30%	28%	41%	31%	13%	
Ifop–Fiducial	27–28 Aug 2020	1,018	39%	61%	0%	22%	55%	44%	1%	11%	
BVA	26–27 Aug 2020	1,002	44%	55%	1%	11%	55%	43%	2%	12%	
Harris Interactive	25–27 Aug 2020	994	45%	55%	0%	10%	47%	53%	0%	6%	
Ifop	19–20 Aug 2020	989	36%	63%	1%	27%	48%	46%	6%	2%	
Elabe	4–5 Aug 2020	1,002	39%	56%	5%	17%	36%	43%	21%	7%	
YouGov	3-4 Aug 2020	1,041	30%	61%	9%	31%	31%	30%	39%	1%	
Harris Interactive	21–23 Jul 2020	960	50%	50%	0%	0%	56%	44%	0%	12%	
Ipsos	17–18 Jul 2020	1,000	39%	56%	5%	17%	33%	27%	40%	6%	
Ifop	15–16 Jul 2020	974	37%	63%	0%	26%	55%	40%	5%	15%	
BVA	15–16 Jul 2020	1,000	39%	61%	0%	22%	56%	42%	2%	14%	
Ifop–Fiducial	9–10 Jul 2020	1,018	38%	62%	0%	24%	47%	53%	0%	6%	

=== Macron and Philippe ===
Polling firm	Fieldwork date	Sample size	Emmanuel Macron				Édouard Philippe				Question wording
Polling firm	Fieldwork date	Sample size	Approve	Disapprove	No opinion	Net	Approve	Disapprove	No opinion	Net	Question wording
Elabe	30 Jun–1 Jul 2020	1,004	35%	60%	5%	25%	43%	48%	9%	5%	
YouGov	29-30 Jun 2020	1,024	29%	64%	7%	35%	44%	47%	9%	3%	
Harris Interactive	23–25 Jun 2020	975	44%	~56%	~0%	~12%	51%	~49%	~0%	2%	
Ifop	12–20 Jun 2020	1,865	38%	60%	2%	22%	50%	48%	2%	2%	
Odoxa	17–18 Jun 2020	1,004	39%	61%	0%	22%	48%	51%	1%	3%	
BVA	17–18 Jun 2020	1,003	38%	62%	0%	24%	54%	45%	1%	9%	
Elabe	2–3 Jun 2020	1,002	33%	62%	5%	29%	39%	55%	6%	16%	
Ipsos	29–30 May 2020	1,013	38%	59%	3%	21%	46%	51%	3%	5%	
Ifop–Fiducial	28–29 May 2020	1,019	40%	60%	0%	20%	53%	47%	0%	7%	
Harris Interactive	26–28 May 2020	961	44%	~56%	~0%	~12%	49%	~51%	~0%	~2%	
Ifop	14–23 May 2020	1,918	39%	60%	1%	21%	46%	52%	2%	6%	
Odoxa	19–20 May 2020	1,004	35%	65%	0%	30%	46%	53%	1%	7%	
BVA	18–19 May 2020	980	37%	62%	1%	25%	46%	53%	1%	7%	
Elabe	4–5 May 2020	1,009	34%	61%	5%	27%	34%	60%	6%	26%	
Ifop–Fiducial	29–30 Apr 2020	1,019	40%	59%	1%	19%	46%	54%	0%	8%	
Harris Interactive	28–30 Apr 2020	947	43%	~57%	~0%	~14%	46%	~54%	~0%	~7%	
Ipsos	23–24 Apr 2020	1,002	38%	58%	4%	20%	41%	54%	5%	13%	
Odoxa	22–23 Apr 2020	1,005	42%	58%	0%	16%	46%	53%	1%	7%	
BVA	22–23 Apr 2020	976	38%	61%	1%	23%	41%	58%	1%	17%	
Ifop	8–18 Apr 2020	1,930	42%	57%	1%	15%	44%	54%	2%	10%	
Elabe	30–31 Mar 2020	1,007	39%	57%	4%	18%	36%	58%	6%	22%	
Ifop	19–28 Mar 2020	1,930	43%	56%	1%	13%	42%	56%	2%	14%	
Ifop–Fiducial	26–27 Mar 2020	1,007	46%	54%	0%	8%	43%	57%	0%	14%	
BVA	25–26 Mar 2020	1,010	40%	59%	1%	19%	44%	55%	1%	9%	
Odoxa	24–25 Mar 2020	1,005	38%	62%	0%	24%	41%	58%	1%	17%	
Ipsos	20–21 Mar 2020	1,000	44%	51%	5%	7%	42%	52%	6%	10%	
Harris Interactive	17–19 Mar 2020	917	51%	~49%	~0%	~1%	48%	~52%	~0%	~4%	
Elabe	3–4 Mar 2020	1,007	29%	66%	5%	37%	27%	65%	8%	38%	
Ifop–Fiducial	26–27 Feb 2020	1,004	33%	67%	0%	34%	36%	64%	0%	28%	
Ifop	14–22 Feb 2020	1,947	32%	66%	2%	34%	36%	60%	4%	24%	
Ipsos	21–22 Feb 2020	1,005	30%	63%	7%	33%	29%	63%	8%	34%	
Odoxa	19–20 Feb 2020	1,005	33%	66%	1%	33%	35%	64%	1%	29%	
BVA	19–20 Feb 2020	1,000	33%	67%	0%	34%	40%	60%	1%	20%	
Harris Interactive	18–20 Feb 2020	909	38%	~62%	~0%	~24%	38%	~62%	~0%	~24%	
Elabe	4–5 Feb 2020	1,005	31%	63%	6%	32%	28%	62%	10%	34%	
Ifop–Fiducial	29–30 Jan 2020	1,000	34%	66%	0%	32%	37%	63%	0%	26%	
Ifop	16–25 Jan 2020	1,952	30%	68%	2%	38%	33%	62%	5%	29%	
Odoxa	22–23 Jan 2020	1,002	36%	64%	0%	28%	36%	63%	1%	27%	
BVA	22–23 Jan 2020	1,005	33%	66%	1%	33%	37%	62%	1%	25%	
Harris Interactive	21–23 Jan 2020	934	40%	~60%	~0%	~20%	40%	~60%	~0%	~20%	
Ipsos	17–18 Jan 2020	1,004	30%	64%	6%	34%	30%	62%	8%	32%	
Elabe	14–15 Jan 2020	1,006	32%	63%	5%	31%	29%	63%	8%	34%	
Kantar	2–6 Jan 2020	1,000	25%	73%	2%	48%	27%	70%	3%	43%	(Note: Do you have complete trust, some trust, some distrust, or no trust at all in ... to solve the problems currently facing France? (Faites-vous tout à fait confiance, plutôt confiance, plutôt pas confiance ou pas du tout confiance à ... pour résoudre les problèmes qui se posent en France actuellement ?))
Harris Interactive	24–27 Dec 2019	915	40%	~60%	~0%	~20%	40%	~60%	~0%	~20%	
Odoxa	18–19 Dec 2019	1,002	33%	67%	0%	34%	35%	65%	0%	30%	
Ipsos	13–14 Dec 2019	1,001	29%	67%	4%	38%	28%	66%	6%	38%	
Ifop	5–14 Dec 2019	1,899	34%	65%	1%	31%	36%	62%	1%	26%	
Elabe	12–13 Dec 2019	1,003	30%	65%	5%	35%	30%	62%	8%	32%	
BVA	11–12 Dec 2019	968	34%	66%	0%	32%	40%	59%	1%	19%	
Ifop–Fiducial	6–7 Dec 2019	1,001	35%	65%	0%	30%	37%	63%	0%	26%	
YouGov	2–3 Dec 2019	1,037	29%	63%	8%	34%	29%	60%	11%	31%	
Kantar	26–30 Nov 2019	1,000	27%	70%	3%	43%	27%	67%	6%	40%	
Harris Interactive	26–28 Nov 2019	900	39%	~61%	~0%	~22%	40%	~60%	~0%	~20%	
Odoxa	20–21 Nov 2019	1,002	34%	65%	1%	31%	35%	64%	1%	29%	
Ifop	8–16 Nov 2019	1,911	33%	65%	2%	32%	37%	60%	3%	23%	
Ipsos	15–16 Nov 2019	1,008	33%	63%	4%	30%	32%	61%	7%	29%	
BVA	13–14 Nov 2019	968	36%	64%	0%	28%	41%	58%	1%	17%	
Ifop–Fiducial	8–9 Nov 2019	954	36%	63%	1%	27%	37%	62%	1%	25%	
Elabe	5–6 Nov 2019	1,002	28%	65%	7%	37%	26%	63%	11%	37%	
YouGov	28–29 Oct 2019	1,009	27%	65%	8%	38%	27%	60%	12%	33%	
Kantar	23–26 Oct 2019	1,000	30%	67%	3%	37%	29%	65%	6%	36%	
Odoxa	23–24 Oct 2019	1,005	35%	65%	0%	30%	37%	62%	1%	25%	
Harris Interactive	22–24 Oct 2019	905	40%	~60%	~0%	~20%	40%	~60%	~0%	~20%	
Ifop	11–19 Oct 2019	1,953	34%	64%	2%	30%	36%	60%	4%	24%	
BVA	16–17 Oct 2019	1,000	37%	62%	1%	25%	40%	59%	1%	19%	
Ipsos	11–12 Oct 2019	1,008	33%	62%	5%	29%	33%	61%	6%	28%	
Ifop–Fiducial	2–3 Oct 2019	1,003	37%	63%	0%	26%	39%	61%	0%	22%	
Elabe	1–2 Oct 2019	1,000	33%	60%	7%	27%	31%	58%	11%	27%	
YouGov	30 Sep–1 Oct 2019	1,022	28%	65%	7%	37%	29%	60%	10%	31%	
Kantar Sofres	26–30 Sep 2019	1,000	29%	67%	4%	38%	31%	62%	7%	31%	
Harris Interactive	24–26 Sep 2019	905	42%	~58%	~0%	~16%	41%	~59%	~0%	~18%	
BVA	18–19 Sep 2019	1,004	37%	63%	0%	26%	41%	58%	1%	17%	
Ifop	13–21 Sep 2019	1,960	33%	64%	3%	31%	38%	56%	6%	18%	
Odoxa	18–19 Sep 2019	1,005	36%	63%	1%	27%	38%	61%	1%	23%	
Ipsos	13–14 Sep 2019	1,009	36%	59%	5%	23%	34%	58%	8%	24%	
Elabe	3–4 Sep 2019	1,002	33%	61%	6%	28%	31%	58%	11%	27%	
YouGov	2–3 Sep 2019	1,022	28%	63%	9%	35%	31%	59%	10%	28%	
Kantar Sofres	29 Aug–2 Sep 2019	1,000	32%	66%	2%	34%	32%	62%	6%	30%	
Ifop–Fiducial	29–30 Aug 2019	1,010	38%	62%	0%	24%	37%	63%	0%	26%	
Harris Interactive	27–29 Aug 2019	910	43%	~57%	~0%	~14%	42%	~58%	~0%	~16%	
BVA	21–22 Aug 2019	966	34%	66%	0%	32%	38%	62%	0%	24%	
Ifop	21–22 Aug 2019	988	34%	66%	0%	32%	36%	64%	0%	28%	
Elabe	30–31 Jul 2019	1,002	28%	67%	5%	39%	28%	64%	8%	36%	
YouGov	29–30 Jul 2019	1,022	22%	70%	8%	48%	27%	63%	10%	36%	
Ipsos	19–20 Jul 2019	1,000	31%	64%	5%	33%	32%	60%	8%	28%	
Ifop	17–18 Jul 2019	996	32%	68%	0%	36%	36%	62%	2%	26%	
OpinionWay	3–4 Jul 2019	1,014	33%	65%	2%	32%	34%	64%	2%	30%	(Note: Are you very satisfied, somewhat satisfied, somewhat dissatisfied, or very dissatisfied with Emmanuel Macron's actions as President of the Republic? Are you very satisfied, somewhat satisfied, somewhat dissatisfied, or very dissatisfied with Edouard Philippe's actions as Prime Minister? (Êtes-vous très satisfait, assez satisfait, assez mécontent ou très mécontent de l’action d’Emmanuel Macron comme Président de la République ? Êtes-vous très satisfait, assez satisfait, assez mécontent ou très mécontent de l’action d’Edouard Philippe comme Premier ministre ?))
Elabe	2–3 Jul 2019	1,009	31%	64%	5%	33%	30%	60%	10%	30%	
YouGov	1–2 Jul 2019	1,045	26%	66%	8%	40%	26%	64%	10%	38%	
Kantar Sofres	27 Jun–1 Jul 2019	1,000	27%	69%	4%	42%	28%	66%	6%	38%	
Ifop–Fiducial	26–27 Jun 2019	1,002	38%	62%	0%	24%	39%	61%	0%	22%	
Harris Interactive	25–27 Jun 2019	894	40%	~60%	~0%	~20%	39%	~61%	~0%	~22%	
Ifop	14–22 Jun 2019	1,910	30%	67%	3%	37%	34%	61%	5%	27%	
BVA	19–20 Jun 2019	1,003	35%	65%	0%	30%	40%	60%	0%	20%	
Odoxa	19–20 Jun 2019	1,002	36%	64%	0%	28%	37%	62%	1%	25%	
Ipsos	14–15 Jun 2019	1,002	32%	64%	4%	32%	30%	64%	6%	34%	
OpinionWay	5–7 Jun 2019	1,014	33%	65%	2%	32%	33%	64%	3%	31%	
Elabe	4–5 Jun 2019	1,007	32%	63%	5%	31%	30%	61%	9%	31%	
YouGov	3–4 Jun 2019	1,013	25%	68%	7%	43%	27%	61%	11%	34%	
Kantar Sofres	28–31 May 2019	1,000	29%	68%	3%	39%	28%	66%	6%	38%	
Harris Interactive	28–30 May 2019	922	40%	~60%	~0%	~20%	41%	~59%	~0%	~18%	
Ifop–Fiducial	28–29 May 2019	1,005	32%	68%	0%	36%	35%	64%	1%	29%	
Odoxa	27 May 2019	980	30%	70%	0%	40%	34%	65%	1%	31%	
Ifop	10–18 May 2019	1,946	30%	67%	3%	37%	34%	61%	5%	27%	
BVA	15–16 May 2019	1,000	32%	68%	0%	36%	36%	63%	1%	27%	
OpinionWay	~15–16 May 2019	~1,000	32%	65%	3%	33%	32%	65%	3%	33%	
Ipsos	10–11 May 2019	1,001	27%	68%	5%	41%	29%	63%	8%	34%	
Elabe	6–7 May 2019	1,583	27%	67%	6%	40%	27%	65%	8%	38%	
Ifop–Fiducial	2–3 May 2019	1,008	30%	70%	0%	40%	32%	67%	1%	35%	
Viavoice	26–29 Apr 2019	1,002	26%	65%	9%	39%	27%	61%	12%	34%	(Note: Do you have a good opinion or a bad opinion of Emmanuel Macron as President of the Republic? Do you have a good opinion or a bad opinion of Edouard Philippe as Prime Minister? (Avez-vous plutôt une bonne opinion ou plutôt une mauvaise opinion d’Emmanuel Macron, en tant que Président de la République ? Avez-vous plutôt une bonne opinion ou plutôt une mauvaise opinion d’Edouard Philippe, en tant que Premier Ministre ?))
YouGov	26–29 Apr 2019	1,010	26%	66%	8%	40%	26%	63%	11%	37%	
Kantar Sofres	24–27 Apr 2019	1,000	25%	72%	3%	47%	26%	68%	6%	42%	
Harris Interactive	23–25 Apr 2019	934	38%	~62%	~0%	~24%	36%	~64%	~0%	~28%	
Ifop	12–20 Apr 2019	1,921	29%	69%	2%	40%	33%	63%	4%	30%	
BVA	17–18 Apr 2019	1,002	32%	67%	1%	35%	37%	63%	0%	26%	
Odoxa	17–18 Apr 2019	1,003	32%	67%	1%	35%	34%	64%	2%	30%	
OpinionWay	17–18 Apr 2019	1,057	27%	70%	3%	43%	29%	68%	3%	39%	
Ipsos	5–6 Apr 2019	1,001	27%	69%	4%	42%	27%	66%	7%	39%	
Elabe	2–3 Apr 2019	1,004	28%	69%	3%	41%	26%	67%	7%	41%	
Kantar Sofres	28 Mar–1 Apr 2019	1,000	26%	71%	3%	45%	28%	67%	5%	39%	
Ifop–Fiducial	28–29 Mar 2019	1,001	29%	71%	0%	42%	33%	67%	0%	34%	
OpinionWay	27–28 Mar 2019	1,051	29%	70%	1%	41%	30%	67%	3%	37%	
YouGov	27–28 Mar 2019	1,001	25%	68%	7%	43%	27%	63%	10%	36%	
Harris Interactive	26–28 Mar 2019	933	38%	~62%	~0%	~24%	39%	~61%	~0%	~22%	
Ifop	15–23 Mar 2019	1,929	29%	69%	2%	40%	33%	64%	3%	31%	
BVA	20–21 Mar 2019	1,001	29%	70%	1%	41%	36%	63%	1%	27%	
Odoxa	20–21 Mar 2019	1,001	30%	70%	0%	40%	34%	65%	1%	31%	
OpinionWay	20–21 Mar 2019	1,009	29%	69%	2%	40%	30%	68%	2%	38%	
OpinionWay	13–14 Mar 2019	1,070	32%	66%	2%	34%	31%	66%	3%	35%	
Elabe	5–6 Mar 2019	1,003	31%	66%	3%	35%	29%	65%	6%	36%	
Ipsos	1–2 Mar 2019	1,035	28%	67%	5%	39%	26%	66%	8%	40%	
Ifop–Fiducial	28 Feb–1 Mar 2019	1,009	31%	69%	0%	38%	35%	65%	0%	30%	
YouGov	27–28 Feb 2019	1,004	24%	70%	7%	46%	24%	66%	9%	42%	
Kantar Sofres	21–25 Feb 2019	1,000	26%	71%	3%	45%	28%	68%	4%	40%	
Harris Interactive	20–22 Feb 2019	897	39%	~61%	~0%	~22%	38%	~62%	~0%	~24%	
BVA	20–21 Feb 2019	1,012	30%	69%	1%	39%	36%	63%	1%	27%	
Odoxa	20–21 Feb 2019	1,004	32%	68%	0%	36%	33%	66%	1%	33%	
Viavoice	19–20 Feb 2019	1,004	28%	61%	11%	33%	28%	61%	11%	33%	
Ifop	7–16 Feb 2019	1,891	28%	71%	1%	43%	31%	66%	3%	35%	
OpinionWay	13–15 Feb 2019	1,027	29%	69%	2%	40%	30%	67%	3%	37%	
Elabe	5–6 Feb 2019	1,000	27%	69%	4%	42%	26%	67%	7%	41%	
Ifop–Fiducial	31 Jan–1 Feb 2019	1,006	34%	66%	0%	32%	34%	66%	0%	32%	
YouGov	30–31 Jan 2019	1,037	21%	73%	6%	52%	22%	69%	9%	47%	
Kantar Sofres	24–28 Jan 2019	1,000	24%	73%	3%	49%	25%	69%	6%	44%	
BVA	23–24 Jan 2019	1,023	31%	69%	0%	38%	36%	63%	1%	27%	
Harris Interactive	22–24 Jan 2019	1,039	35%	~65%	~0%	~30%	32%	~68%	~0%	~36%	
Odoxa	22–23 Jan 2019	1,003	30%	69%	1%	39%	32%	67%	1%	35%	
Ifop	11–19 Jan 2019	1,928	27%	72%	1%	45%	30%	67%	3%	37%	
OpinionWay	17–18 Jan 2019	1,042	30%	68%	2%	38%	31%	67%	2%	36%	
Ipsos	11–12 Jan 2019	1,005	23%	74%	3%	51%	25%	70%	5%	45%	
Elabe	8–9 Jan 2019	1,003	25%	71%	4%	46%	26%	68%	6%	42%	
YouGov	4–7 Jan 2019	1,027	21%	72%	7%	51%	22%	69%	9%	47%	
Kantar Sofres	3–7 Jan 2019	1,000	22%	75%	3%	53%	25%	70%	5%	45%	
Ifop–Fiducial	3–4 Jan 2019	1,014	28%	72%	0%	44%	33%	66%	1%	33%	
Harris Interactive	21–26 Dec 2018	1,028	31%	~69%	~0%	~38%	27%	~73%	~0%	~46%	
BVA	18–19 Dec 2018	1,105	27%	72%	1%	45%	30%	68%	2%	38%	
Ifop	7–15 Dec 2018	1,943	23%	76%	1%	53%	31%	66%	3%	35%	
Odoxa	13–14 Dec 2018	990	27%	73%	0%	46%	31%	68%	1%	37%	
OpinionWay	12–13 Dec 2018	1,029	31%	67%	2%	36%	31%	66%	3%	35%	
Ipsos	7–8 Dec 2018	971	20%	76%	4%	56%	22%	72%	6%	50%	
Elabe	4–5 Dec 2018	1,002	23%	74%	3%	51%	23%	73%	4%	50%	
Kantar Sofres	29 Nov–3 Dec 2018	1,000	21%	77%	2%	56%	22%	74%	4%	52%	
Ifop–Fiducial	29–30 Nov 2018	1,004	23%	76%	1%	53%	26%	73%	1%	47%	
Viavoice	28–29 Nov 2018	1,021	23%	69%	8%	46%	25%	66%	9%	41%	
YouGov	28–29 Nov 2018	1,006	18%	76%	6%	58%	21%	70%	9%	49%	
Harris Interactive	27–29 Nov 2018	908	32%	~68%	~0%	~36%	31%	~69%	~0%	~38%	
BVA	21–22 Nov 2018	1,258	26%	73%	1%	47%	30%	69%	1%	39%	
Ipsos	16–17 Nov 2018	1,000	26%	70%	4%	44%	27%	65%	8%	38%	
Ifop	9–17 Nov 2018	1,957	25%	73%	2%	48%	34%	62%	4%	28%	
Odoxa	15–16 Nov 2018	1,005	32%	68%	0%	36%	36%	63%	1%	27%	
OpinionWay	14–15 Nov 2018	1,064	29%	69%	2%	40%	30%	67%	3%	37%	
Elabe	6–7 Nov 2018	1,002	27%	69%	4%	42%	27%	65%	8%	38%	
Kantar Sofres	24–27 Oct 2018	1,000	26%	71%	3%	45%	31%	64%	5%	33%	
Ifop–Fiducial	25–26 Oct 2018	1,024	29%	71%	0%	42%	36%	64%	0%	28%	
BVA	24–25 Oct 2018	1,090	29%	70%	1%	41%	40%	57%	3%	17%	
YouGov	24–25 Oct 2018	1,010	21%	69%	10%	48%	27%	57%	15%	30%	
Harris Interactive	23–25 Oct 2018	989	33%	~67%	~0%	~34%	37%	~63%	~0%	~26%	
Viavoice	19–22 Oct 2018	1,007	26%	65%	9%	39%	34%	53%	13%	19%	
Ipsos	19–20 Oct 2018	1,003	26%	70%	4%	44%	31%	59%	10%	28%	
Ifop	13–20 Oct 2018	1,968	29%	70%	1%	41%	41%	55%	4%	14%	
OpinionWay	17–18 Oct 2018	1,063	29%	68%	3%	39%	32%	65%	3%	33%	
Odoxa	4–5 Oct 2018	1,014	33%	66%	1%	33%	37%	62%	1%	25%	
Elabe	2–3 Oct 2018	1,001	30%	66%	4%	36%	28%	61%	11%	33%	
Kantar Sofres	27 Sep–1 Oct 2018	1,000	30%	67%	3%	37%	31%	61%	8%	30%	
Ifop–Fiducial	27–28 Sep 2018	1,008	33%	67%	0%	34%	36%	64%	0%	28%	
BVA	26–27 Sep 2018	1,011	32%	67%	1%	35%	39%	59%	2%	20%	
YouGov	26–27 Sep 2018	1,006	25%	67%	7%	42%	27%	59%	15%	32%	
Harris Interactive	25–27 Sep 2018	1,022	34%	~66%	~0%	~32%	33%	~67%	~0%	~34%	
Ifop	14–22 Sep 2018	1,964	29%	70%	1%	41%	34%	61%	5%	27%	
OpinionWay	19–20 Sep 2018	1,061	28%	70%	2%	42%	31%	66%	3%	35%	
Ipsos	7–8 Sep 2018	998	25%	69%	6%	44%	26%	63%	11%	37%	
Odoxa	5–6 Sep 2018	1,004	29%	71%	0%	42%	35%	64%	1%	29%	
Elabe	4–5 Sep 2018	1,000	31%	64%	5%	33%	27%	60%	13%	33%	
Ifop–Fiducial	30–31 Aug 2018	1,015	31%	69%	0%	38%	35%	65%	0%	30%	
BVA	29–30 Aug 2018	1,040	34%	66%	0%	32%	38%	61%	1%	23%	
YouGov	29–30 Aug 2018	1,099	23%	69%	8%	46%	24%	64%	12%	40%	
Harris Interactive	28–30 Aug 2018	977	36%	~64%	~0%	~28%	34%	~66%	~0%	~32%	
Kantar Sofres	23–27 Aug 2018	1,000	33%	64%	3%	31%	32%	61%	7%	29%	
Ifop	23–24 Aug 2018	995	34%	66%	0%	32%	40%	58%	2%	18%	
Viavoice	20–21 Aug 2018	1,008	36%	51%	13%	15%	36%	47%	17%	11%	
Elabe	31 Jul–1 Aug 2018	1,007	36%	60%	4%	24%	35%	54%	11%	19%	
Ifop	18–27 Jul 2018	1,981	39%	61%	0%	22%	41%	57%	2%	16%	
YouGov	25–26 Jul 2018	1,017	27%	62%	11%	35%	30%	55%	15%	25%	
Harris Interactive	24–26 Jul 2018	966	42%	~58%	~0%	~16%	42%	~58%	~0%	~16%	
Ipsos	20–21 Jul 2018	999	32%	60%	8%	28%	32%	56%	12%	24%	
BVA	18–19 Jul 2018	1,003	39%	59%	2%	20%	43%	54%	3%	11%	
OpinionWay	~18–19 Jul 2018	~1,000	35%	62%	3%	27%	37%	59%	4%	22%	
Elabe	3–4 Jul 2018	1,001	34%	60%	6%	26%	31%	57%	12%	26%	
Kantar Sofres	28 Jun–2 Jul 2018	923	32%	64%	4%	32%	32%	61%	7%	29%	
Ifop–Fiducial	27–29 Jun 2018	1,008	41%	59%	0%	18%	38%	62%	0%	24%	
YouGov	27–28 Jun 2018	1,028	32%	59%	10%	27%	30%	54%	16%	24%	
Harris Interactive	26–28 Jun 2018	928	40%	~60%	~0%	~20%	40%	~60%	~0%	~20%	
Ipsos	22–23 Jun 2018	996	36%	59%	5%	23%	34%	54%	12%	20%	
Ifop	15–23 Jun 2018	1,963	40%	58%	2%	18%	42%	54%	4%	12%	
Odoxa	22 Jun 2018	1,007	41%	59%	0%	18%	40%	59%	1%	19%	
BVA	20–21 Jun 2018	1,000	41%	53%	6%	12%	42%	50%	8%	8%	
OpinionWay	~20–21 Jun 2018	~1,000	42%	59%	0%	17%	39%	59%	2%	20%	
Viavoice	8–12 Jun 2018	1,005	37%	51%	12%	14%	37%	47%	16%	10%	
Elabe	5–6 Jun 2018	1,002	40%	55%	5%	15%	37%	54%	9%	17%	
Ifop–Fiducial	30 May–1 Jun 2018	1,007	43%	57%	0%	14%	43%	57%	0%	14%	
YouGov	30–31 May 2018	1,005	33%	54%	13%	21%	32%	48%	19%	16%	
Harris Interactive	29–31 May 2018	952	47%	~53%	~0%	~6%	45%	~55%	~0%	~10%	
Kantar Sofres	24–28 May 2018	1,000	38%	57%	5%	19%	38%	53%	9%	15%	
Ifop	17–26 May 2018	1,933	41%	57%	2%	16%	45%	50%	5%	5%	
BVA	23–24 May 2018	1,000	40%	56%	4%	16%	43%	53%	4%	10%	
Ipsos	18–19 May 2018	1,025	37%	58%	5%	21%	35%	55%	10%	20%	
OpinionWay	~16–17 May 2018	~1,000	44%	54%	2%	10%	42%	54%	4%	12%	
Odoxa	15–16 May 2018	1,015	46%	54%	0%	8%	48%	51%	1%	3%	
Elabe	30 Apr–2 May 2018	1,008	41%	53%	6%	12%	37%	53%	10%	16%	
Ifop–Fiducial	26–27 Apr 2018	1,000	45%	55%	0%	10%	44%	56%	0%	12%	
YouGov	25–26 Apr 2018	1,013	33%	54%	13%	21%	31%	52%	17%	21%	
Harris Interactive	24–26 Apr 2018	908	50%	~50%	~0%	~0%	46%	~54%	~0%	~8%	
Kantar Sofres	23–26 Apr 2018	1,000	41%	56%	3%	15%	39%	54%	7%	15%	
Ipsos	20–21 Apr 2018	1,013	40%	52%	8%	12%	36%	50%	14%	14%	
Ifop	12–21 Apr 2018	1,949	44%	55%	1%	11%	45%	50%	5%	5%	
BVA	18–19 Apr 2018	1,011	43%	54%	3%	11%	45%	51%	4%	6%	
Odoxa	18–19 Apr 2018	1,017	47%	53%	0%	6%	46%	53%	1%	7%	
OpinionWay	~18–19 Apr 2018	~1,000	44%	53%	3%	9%	43%	53%	4%	10%	
Viavoice	16–17 Apr 2018	1,000	41%	46%	13%	5%	39%	44%	17%	5%	
Elabe	3–4 Apr 2018	1,008	39%	55%	6%	16%	35%	53%	12%	18%	
Kantar Sofres	28–31 Mar 2018	1,000	40%	56%	5%	16%	38%	54%	8%	16%	
Ifop–Fiducial	29–30 Mar 2018	1,010	45%	55%	0%	10%	46%	54%	0%	8%	
Harris Interactive	27–29 Mar 2018	922	49%	~51%	~0%	~2%	47%	~53%	~0%	~6%	
YouGov	27–28 Mar 2018	1,004	32%	56%	12%	24%	33%	51%	16%	18%	
Odoxa	22–23 Mar 2018	1,018	45%	54%	1%	9%	45%	54%	1%	9%	
BVA	21–22 Mar 2018	1,053	40%	57%	3%	17%	43%	54%	3%	11%	
Ipsos	16–17 Mar 2018	1,011	37%	55%	8%	18%	35%	54%	11%	19%	
Ifop	9–17 Mar 2018	1,946	42%	57%	1%	15%	43%	54%	3%	11%	
OpinionWay	~14–15 Mar 2018	~1,000	46%	52%	2%	6%	47%	50%	3%	3%	
Ifop–Fiducial	1–3 Mar 2018	1,500	44%	55%	1%	11%	46%	53%	1%	7%	
Elabe	27–28 Feb 2018	999	41%	52%	7%	11%	37%	51%	12%	14%	
BVA	26–27 Feb 2018	1,019	43%	53%	4%	10%	47%	48%	5%	1%	
Kantar Sofres	22–26 Feb 2018	1,000	43%	53%	4%	10%	40%	52%	8%	12%	
Viavoice	22–23 Feb 2018	1,010	41%	45%	14%	4%	40%	42%	18%	2%	
Odoxa	21–22 Feb 2018	973	43%	57%	0%	14%	43%	56%	1%	13%	
YouGov	21–22 Feb 2018	1,026	30%	58%	12%	28%	30%	54%	16%	24%	
Harris Interactive	20–22 Feb 2018	951	49%	~51%	~0%	~2%	46%	~54%	~0%	~8%	
Ifop	9–17 Feb 2018	1,953	44%	55%	1%	11%	46%	50%	4%	4%	
OpinionWay	~14–15 Feb 2018	~1,000	47%	50%	3%	3%	45%	51%	4%	6%	
Ipsos	9–10 Feb 2018	1,001	35%	55%	10%	20%	34%	51%	15%	17%	
Ifop–Fiducial	2–3 Feb 2018	1,003	48%	51%	1%	3%	50%	49%	1%	1%	
Elabe	30–31 Jan 2018	1,000	38%	56%	6%	18%	34%	54%	12%	20%	
BVA	29–30 Jan 2018	1,101	47%	48%	5%	1%	45%	48%	7%	3%	
Kantar Sofres	25–29 Jan 2018	1,000	44%	51%	5%	7%	42%	50%	8%	8%	
YouGov	24–25 Jan 2018	1,008	41%	45%	13%	4%	36%	45%	19%	9%	
Harris Interactive	23–25 Jan 2018	946	52%	~48%	~0%	~4%	49%	~51%	~0%	~2%	
Ifop	12–20 Jan 2018	1,947	50%	49%	1%	1%	49%	47%	4%	2%	
Odoxa	17–18 Jan 2018	1,006	49%	50%	1%	1%	50%	49%	1%	1%	
OpinionWay	~17–18 Jan 2018	~1,000	51%	47%	2%	4%	49%	48%	3%	1%	
Ipsos	12–13 Jan 2018	1,050	40%	49%	11%	9%	35%	49%	16%	14%	
Kantar Sofres	4–8 Jan 2018	1,000	44%	51%	5%	7%	42%	48%	10%	6%	
Ifop–Fiducial	5–6 Jan 2018	1,003	53%	45%	2%	8%	59%	39%	2%	20%	
YouGov	4–5 Jan 2018	1,009	41%	46%	13%	5%	38%	44%	18%	6%	
Elabe	2–3 Jan 2018	1,001	42%	50%	8%	8%	37%	48%	15%	11%	
Harris Interactive	26–28 Dec 2017	900	52%	47%	1%	5%	49%	51%	0%	2%	
OpinionWay	~20–21 Dec 2017	~1,000	49%	50%	1%	1%	49%	50%	1%	1%	
BVA	18–19 Dec 2017	1,199	52%	45%	3%	7%	52%	44%	4%	8%	
Ifop	8–16 Dec 2017	1,942	52%	46%	2%	6%	54%	42%	4%	12%	
Odoxa	13–14 Dec 2017	1,028	54%	46%	0%	8%	57%	42%	1%	15%	
Viavoice	11–13 Dec 2017	1,008	46%	38%	16%	8%	44%	33%	23%	11%	
Ipsos	8–9 Dec 2017	1,016	39%	50%	11%	11%	37%	47%	16%	10%	
Ifop–Fiducial	1–2 Dec 2017	978	50%	48%	2%	2%	52%	44%	4%	8%	
YouGov	29–30 Nov 2017	1,006	35%	50%	15%	15%	36%	43%	21%	7%	
Harris Interactive	28–30 Nov 2017	937	46%	53%	1%	7%	48%	52%	0%	4%	
Elabe	28–29 Nov 2017	1,001	40%	54%	6%	14%	39%	47%	14%	8%	
BVA	27–28 Nov 2017	972	46%	51%	3%	5%	50%	46%	4%	4%	
Kantar Sofres	23–27 Nov 2017	1,000	42%	54%	4%	12%	40%	50%	10%	10%	
Odoxa	22–23 Nov 2017	1,009	45%	55%	0%	10%	46%	53%	1%	7%	
Ifop	10–18 Nov 2017	1,964	46%	52%	2%	6%	49%	45%	6%	4%	
OpinionWay	~15–16 Nov 2017	~1,000	45%	52%	3%	7%	45%	51%	4%	6%	
Ipsos	10–11 Nov 2017	1,043	37%	53%	10%	16%	36%	45%	19%	9%	
Viavoice	31 Oct–2 Nov 2017	1,002	40%	46%	14%	6%	40%	37%	23%	3%	
Elabe	30–31 Oct 2017	1,152	38%	56%	6%	18%	38%	53%	9%	15%	
Ifop–Fiducial	27–28 Oct 2017	1,004	44%	55%	1%	11%	50%	46%	4%	4%	
Kantar Sofres	25–28 Oct 2017	983	38%	57%	5%	19%	36%	54%	10%	18%	
YouGov	25–27 Oct 2017	1,034	32%	55%	13%	23%	32%	46%	23%	14%	
Harris Interactive	24–26 Oct 2017	917	48%	52%	0%	4%	48%	52%	0%	4%	
BVA	24–25 Oct 2017	1,193	42%	56%	2%	14%	44%	50%	6%	6%	
Ifop	13–21 Oct 2017	1,938	42%	56%	2%	14%	47%	47%	6%	0%	
Odoxa	18–19 Oct 2017	995	44%	56%	0%	12%	45%	54%	1%	9%	
OpinionWay	~18–19 Oct 2017	~1,000	44%	51%	5%	7%	45%	49%	6%	4%	
Ipsos	13–14 Oct 2017	957	34%	54%	12%	20%	33%	49%	18%	16%	
Elabe	3–4 Oct 2017	1,001	40%	54%	6%	14%	36%	50%	14%	14%	
Kantar Sofres	28 Sep–2 Oct 2017	1,000	39%	56%	5%	17%	37%	52%	11%	15%	
Ifop–Fiducial	29–30 Sep 2017	1,003	44%	55%	1%	11%	52%	46%	2%	6%	
YouGov	27–28 Sep 2017	1,002	32%	56%	12%	24%	34%	47%	19%	13%	
Harris Interactive	26–28 Sep 2017	914	49%	51%	0%	2%	48%	51%	1%	3%	
BVA	25–26 Sep 2017	1,092	45%	51%	4%	6%	48%	46%	6%	2%	
Ifop	15–23 Sep 2017	1,989	45%	53%	2%	8%	48%	46%	6%	2%	
OpinionWay	~20–21 Sep 2017	~1,000	41%	56%	3%	15%	42%	53%	5%	11%	
Odoxa	13–14 Sep 2017	992	44%	56%	0%	12%	46%	53%	1%	7%	
Viavoice	12–13 Sep 2017	1,007	38%	47%	15%	9%	40%	40%	20%	0%	
Ipsos	8–9 Sep 2017	988	32%	54%	14%	22%	32%	48%	20%	16%	
Elabe	5–6 Sep 2017	1,002	37%	58%	5%	21%	32%	57%	11%	25%	
Ifop–Fiducial	1–2 Sep 2017	1,003	46%	54%	0%	8%	52%	46%	2%	6%	
BVA	28–29 Aug 2017	1,162	43%	55%	2%	12%	46%	50%	4%	4%	
YouGov	28–29 Aug 2017	1,003	30%	54%	15%	24%	32%	47%	21%	15%	
Kantar Sofres	24–28 Aug 2017	983	41%	52%	7%	11%	39%	47%	14%	8%	
Ifop	25–26 Aug 2017	1,023	40%	57%	3%	17%	47%	45%	8%	2%	
Harris Interactive	22–24 Aug 2017	942	46%	54%	0%	8%	44%	56%	0%	12%	
OpinionWay	~16–17 Aug 2017	~1,000	41%	56%	3%	15%	43%	53%	4%	10%	
Elabe	1–2 Aug 2017	1,000	40%	55%	5%	15%	37%	51%	12%	14%	
YouGov	26–27 Jul 2017	1,003	36%	49%	14%	13%	37%	42%	21%	5%	
Harris Interactive	25–27 Jul 2017	1,000	51%	49%	0%	2%	49%	50%	1%	1%	
Ipsos	21–22 Jul 2017	1,022	42%	42%	16%	0%	41%	36%	23%	5%	
Ifop	17–22 Jul 2017	1,947	54%	43%	3%	11%	56%	37%	7%	19%	
OpinionWay	~19–20 Jul 2017	~1,000	60%	36%	4%	24%	58%	36%	6%	22%	
BVA	17–18 Jul 2017	1,007	54%	44%	2%	10%	55%	42%	3%	13%	
Ifop–Fiducial	7–8 Jul 2017	1,002	56%	42%	2%	14%	60%	37%	3%	23%	
Elabe	4–5 Jul 2017	999	45%	46%	9%	1%	43%	46%	11%	3%	
YouGov	28–30 Jun 2017	1,016	43%	36%	21%	7%	39%	31%	30%	8%	
Harris Interactive	27–29 Jun 2017	941	59%	41%	0%	18%	58%	42%	0%	16%	
Viavoice	23–26 Jun 2017	1,011	53%	27%	20%	26%	46%	25%	29%	21%	
Kantar Sofres	22–26 Jun 2017	1,000	54%	39%	7%	15%	47%	38%	15%	9%	
Ipsos	23–24 Jun 2017	1,058	45%	27%	28%	18%	39%	24%	37%	15%	
Ifop	14–24 Jun 2017	1,883	64%	35%	1%	29%	64%	32%	4%	32%	
Odoxa	21–22 Jun 2017	1,008	58%	41%	1%	17%	57%	41%	2%	16%	
BVA	19–20 Jun 2017	1,187	59%	39%	2%	20%	57%	38%	5%	19%	
Ifop–Fiducial	16–17 Jun 2017	980	60%	38%	2%	22%	61%	36%	3%	25%	
Elabe	5–6 Jun 2017	1,001	45%	45%	10%	0%	38%	46%	16%	8%	
Kantar Sofres	24–29 May 2017	1,000	57%	38%	5%	19%	49%	36%	15%	13%	
Harris Interactive	23–26 May 2017	934	57%	43%	0%	14%	53%	46%	1%	7%	
YouGov	24–25 May 2017	1,008	39%	32%	29%	7%	31%	28%	40%	3%	
BVA	22–23 May 2017	1,011	62%	35%	3%	27%	59%	34%	7%	25%	
Odoxa	22–23 May 2017	1,014	58%	41%	1%	17%	55%	43%	2%	12%	
Viavoice	19–22 May 2017	1,006	49%	30%	21%	19%	33%	25%	42%	8%	
Ifop	19–20 May 2017	973	62%	31%	7%	31%	55%	24%	21%	31%	
Ifop–Fiducial	19–20 May 2017	1,006	66%	30%	4%	36%	63%	27%	10%	36%	
Ipsos	19–20 May 2017	1,015	46%	27%	27%	19%	31%	21%	48%	10%	
Elabe	16–17 May 2017	999	45%	46%	9%	1%	36%	43%	21%	7%	

== See also ==
- Opinion polling for the 2017 French presidential election
- Opinion polling for the 2022 French presidential election
- List of heads of the executive by approval rating
