= List of heads of the executive by approval rating =

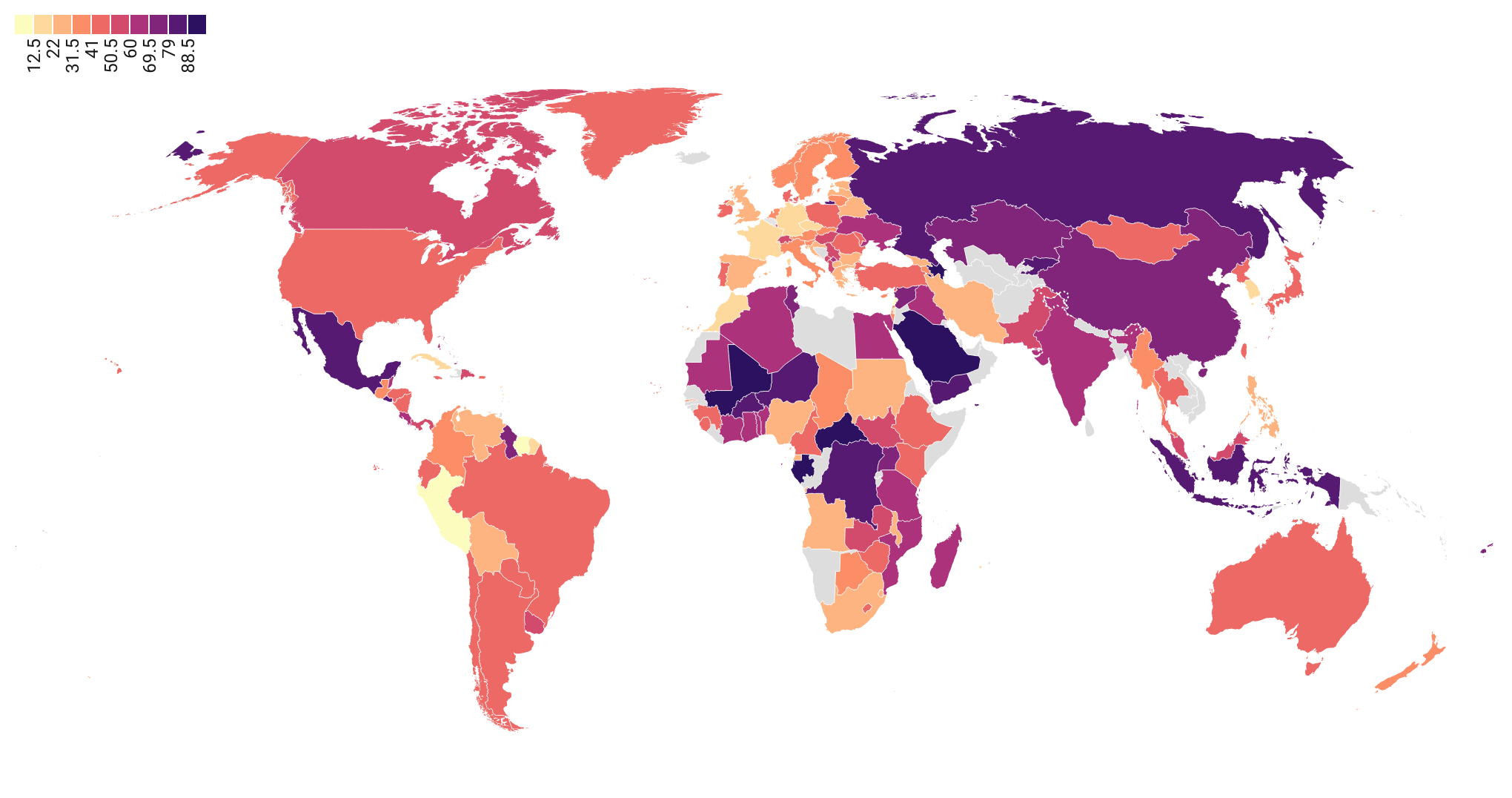
Map of head of state approval ratings as of spring 2025

This is a list of current heads of the executive by domestic approval rating. The highest current total approval percentage is difficult to determine because of the high falsification rate in countries where answering an approval question negatively could lead to government repression, or where polling agencies have become partisan. For example, on the basis of a 2020 poll, General Secretary of the Chinese Communist Party Xi Jinping appeared to have had a 94% approval rate; after controlling for answer falsification, it was revealed to be >73%. The rally 'round the flag effect comes into play during periods of war or international crisis. Genuine high approval ratings can be explained by a number of factors. James Stimson termed the higher ratings shortly after an election the "honeymoon effect".

Dina Boluarte of Peru, prior to her 2025 impeachment, was considered "perhaps the most unpopular president in the world", with 2% approval according to Ipsos. Other exceptionally low approval ratings from reliable polls include 2.8% for Haiti's Ariel Henry after taking office following the assassination of Jovenel Moïse in 2021 and 3% for Suriname's Chan Santokhi, both taken by Vanderbilt University's AmericasBarometer project.

The following heads of the executive held very high (>70%) approval ratings for at least 4 years:

- (Azerbaijan) Ilham Aliyev (?–present)†
- (El Salvador) Nayib Bukele (2019–present)
- (Mozambique) Joaquim Chissano (1986–2005)
- (United Kingdom) Winston Churchill (1940–1945)*
- (Ecuador) Rafael Correa (2007–2015)*
- (Philippines) Rodrigo Duterte (2016–2022)
- (Mali) Assimi Goïta (2021–present)†
- (Mozambique) Armando Guebuza (2005–2015)
- (Bangladesh) Sheikh Hasina (2009–2024)*
- (Myanmar) Min Aung Hlaing (2021–present)†
- (Kyrgyzstan) Sadyr Japarov (2021–present)
- (Sri Lanka) D. M. Jayaratne (2010–2015)
- (Kenya) Uhuru Kenyatta (2013–2021)*
- (Botswana) Ian Khama (2008–2018)
- (Tanzania) Jakaya Kikwete (2005–2015)
- (Argentina) Néstor Kirchner (2003–2007)
- (Ghana) John Kufuor (2001–2009)
- (Singapore) Lee Hsien Loong (2004–2024)
- (Tanzania) John Magufuli (2015–2021)
- (India) Narendra Modi (2019–2021, 2021–present)*
- (Uganda) Yoweri Museveni (1986–2005, ?–present)*
- (Burundi) Pierre Nkurunziza (2005–2020)
- (Uzbekistan) Shavkat Mirziyoyev (2016–present)
- (Namibia) Hifikepunye Pohamba (2005–2015)
- (Russia) Vladimir Putin (2000, 2001–2004, 2005–2008, 2014–2018, 2022–present)*
- (Madagascar) Marc Ravalomanana (2002–2009)
- (Iran) Hassan Rouhani (2013–2016, 2017)*
- (Kazakhstan) Kassym-Jomart Tokayev (2019–present)
- (Australia) John Curtin (1941-1945)
- (Colombia) Álvaro Uribe (2002–2010)

* Executives whose approval was not always above 70%. The date ranges in parentheses are the dates within which executives polled above this cutoff.
† Polls excluding ungoverned territory with population large enough to significantly affect percentage.

List of heads of the executive by approval rating
Country	Name	Year	Sample size	+	Very +	Mostly +	-	Mostly -	Very -	Source
Gabon	Brice Oligui Nguema	2024-05-10	1200	93.2%	47.4%	45.8%	6.2%	3.5%	2.7%	
Mali (Note: Breakaway regions excepted.)	Assimi Goïta	2024-11-22	1200	91.8%	69.8%	22.0%	7.9%	2.9%	5.0%	
Azerbaijan	Ilham Aliyev	2024; 2016	800	91% 87.3%	81% /	10% /	5% 5.7%	3.6%	2.1%	
Kyrgyzstan	Sadyr Japarov	2024-01-19	1500	88%	52%	36%	10%	7%	3%	
Burkina Faso	Ibrahim Traoré	2025-09-24; 2023	645	87% 87.6% (Note: Online poll.)	58.9%	28.7%	12% 12.4%	9.3%	3.1%	
Russia	Vladimir Putin	2026-04; 2022	1600; 6995	79% 78%	50%	28%	16% 20%	9%	11%	
Senegal	Bassirou Diomaye Faye	2025-03-09	1200	77.5%	48.0%	29.5%	20.8%	10.8%	10.0%	
Singapore	Lawrence Wong	2025; 2024-10-21	1504; 1000	75% 70.6%	14.6%	56.0%	25% 13.6%	9.0%	4.6%	
Indonesia	Prabowo Subianto	2026-03-08	1220	74.9%	9.0%	65.9%	23.5%	21.3%	2.2%	
DRC (Note: North Kivu excepted.)	Félix Tshisekedi	2025-08-29; 2019	2961	74% 73%	39%	34%	24% 20%	13%	7%	
Ivory Coast	Alassane Ouattara	2024-01-16	1200	73.7%	50.1%	23.6%	25.8%	16.7%	9.1%	
Fiji	Sitiveni Rabuka	2023-07-12	1014	72% (Note: Poll allowed "neutral". This decreases both "approve" and "disapprove" percentages.)			3%			
Guyana	Irfaan Ali	2022	630	72%			21%			
Uganda	Yoweri Museveni	2024-02-01	2400	70.2%	27.3%	42.9%	23.7%	13.9%	9.8%	
El Salvador	Nayib Bukele	2026-04-18	2138	70.1%	42.5%	27.6%	26.3%	13.3%	13.0%	
Canada	Mark Carney	2026-02-09	6535	70%			30%			
India	Narendra Modi	2025	125123	70% >61.8%	36%	26%	24% >21%	8%	13%	
Iraq	Mohammed Shia' Al Sudani	2024; 2023	2408; 1035	69% (Note: 71% when Iraqi Kurdistan is excluded.)	45% /					
Ghana	John Mahama	2025		>66%			>23%			
Mexico	Claudia Sheinbaum	2026-04-18	2575	66.5%	34.3%	32.2%	31.4%	8.9%	22.5%	
Kosovo	Vjosa Osmani	2024	1520	66%	38%	28%	31%	12%	19%	
Bahamas	Philip Davis	2023		65%	23%	42%	18%	9%	9%	
South Korea	Lee Jae Myung	2026-04-07; 2025	1001	63% 59.3%	43.9%	15.4%	30% 34.6%	10.2%	24.4%	
Liberia	Joseph Boakai	2024-08-21	1200	62.1%	20.0%	42.1%	36.7%	21.3%	15.4%	
Kazakhstan	Kassym-Jomart Tokayev	2024; 2022	8101; 2500	61.3% 74%	38%	36%	17.0% 26%	18%	8%	
Tanzania	Samia Suluhu Hassan	2024-07-07-24	2400	60.1%	19.7%	40.4%	36.9%	18.9%	18.0%	
Togo	Faure Gnassingbé	2024-11-30	1200	59.8%	11.3%	48.5%	36.7%	25.9%	10.8%	
Sierra Leone	Julius Maada Bio	2025-04-16	1200	59.5%	18.4%	41.1%	39.5%	24.8%	14.7%	
Albania	Edi Rama	2024	1216	59% (Note: 47% earlier in the year.)	23%	36%	40%	27%	17%	
Ukraine	Volodymyr Zelenskyy	2026-04-27	1005	58%	25%	33%	36%	18%	18%	
Montenegro	Milojko Spajić	2024	1036	58%	16%	42%	39%	20%	19%	
Serbia	Aleksandar Vučić	2024	1238	58%	41%	17%	41%	12%	29%	
Zambia	Hakainde Hichilema	2024–07-28	1200	57.3%	23.1%	34.2%	38.0%	18.1%	19.9%	
Lebanon	Nawaf Salam	2025		56%			36%			
Peru	Keiko Fujimori	2026-08-10	4067	55.0%	33.5%	21.5%	40.7%	18.2%	22.5%	
Czech Republic	Andrej Babiš	2026-04-07		55%			35%			
Moldova (Note: Excluding Transnistria.)	Maia Sandu	2025	1206	54%	28%	26%	45%	17%	28%	
São Tomé and Príncipe	Carlos Vila Nova	2024–10-12	1200	53.8%	8.0%	45.8%	37.6%	26.9%	10.7%	
Japan	Sanae Takaichi	2025		53%			35%			
Colombia	Abelardo de la Espriella	2026-08-10	4012	52.4%	14.9%	37.5%	42.2%	24.0%	18.2%	
Guinea-Bissau	Umaro Sissoco Embaló	2025-09-03	1200	52.4%	35.6%	16.8%	37.6%	21.1%	16.5%	
Chad	Mahamat Déby	2025-04-13	1128	52.0%	22.8%	29.2%	44.0%	31.7%	12.3%	
Malaysia	Anwar Ibrahim	2026	1209	52%			44%			
Luxembourg	Luc Frieden	2025	1042	52.0% (Note: Average of "competence" and "sympathy")						
Brazil	Luiz Inácio Lula da Silva	2026-08-10	4271	51.9%	14.4%	37.5%	46.1%	26.8%	19.3%	
Bolivia	Rodrigo Paz	2026-08-10	3793	50.5%	28.5%	22.0%	44.9%	16.3%	28.6%	
Taiwan	Lai Ching-te	2025	1077	50.4%			41.2%			
Costa Rica	Laura Fernández	2026-08-10	3854	49.8%	18.3%	31.5%	44.3%	14.4%	29.9%	
Ethiopia	Abiy Ahmed	2023-06-22	2400	49.8%	12.6%	37.2%	47.9%	29.1%	18.8%	
Kenya	William Ruto	2024-05-03	2400	48.4%	11.9%	36.5%	49.0%	23.0%	26.0%	
Dominican Republic	Luis Abinader	2026-08-10	3931	48.1%	29.5%	18.6%	47.6%	17.8%	29.8%	
Chile	José Antonio Kast	2026-08-10	4047	47.7%	30.7%	17.8%	49.7%	18.9%	30.8%	
Zimbabwe	Emmerson Mnangagwa	2024-06-15	1200	47.6%	20.3%	27.3%	45.1%	23.1%	22.0%	
Cape Verde	Ulisses Correia e Silva	2024–09-10	1200	47.3%	5.0%	42.3%	39.2%	30.6%	8.4%	
Paraguay	Santiago Peña	2026-04-18	3915	47.2%	26.6%	20.6%	51.1%	28.2%	22.9%	
Switzerland	Guy Parmelin	2026-04-07		47%			24%			
Lesotho	Sam Matekane	2024–03-18	1200	47%	23%	24%	44%	13%	31%	
Mauritania	Mohamed Ould Ghazouani	2025-01-17	1200	46.9%	12.7%	34.2%	48.0%	32.2%	15.8%	
Malta	Robert Abela	2025		46.5%						
Armenia	Nikol Pashinyan	2026-02-13	1506	46%	20%	26%	51%	15%	36%	
Ecuador	Daniel Noboa	2026-08-10	4032	45.3%	18.2%	27.1%	51.3%	23.7%	27.6%	
Ireland	Micheál Martin	2025		45%						
Denmark	Mette Frederiksen	2025	2026	45%			23%			
Belize	Johnny Briceño	2024		>44%			>23%			
Romania	Ilie Bolojan	2025	1354	44%			50%			
Cameroon	Paul Biya	2024-03-20	1200	43.6%	7.3%	36.3%	53.3%	33.9%	19.4%	
Poland	Donald Tusk	2026-04-07; 2025	1000	43% 47.1%	20.6%	26.5%	45% 48.6%	20.8%	27.9%	
Bulgaria	Rumen Radev	2026-07	821	42%			33%			
Jamaica	Andrew Holness	2025; 2023	1500; 1294	42% 40.0%	13.1%	26.9%	26% 15.2%	15.6%	35.6%	
Honduras	Nasry Asfura	2026-08-10	3822	41.6%	16.1%	25.5%	55.5%	29.8%	25.7%	
Guinea	Mamady Doumbouya	2024-06-09	1200	41.5%	11.2%	30.3%	52.1%	32.4%	19.7%	
Myanmar	Min Aung Hlaing (Note: Opinion of the State Administration Council.)	2024	2402	40%	8%	32%	47%	17%	30%	
New Zealand	Christopher Luxon	2025; 2024	1000; 1150	40% 29%	9%	20%	47% 47%	14%	32%	
Australia	Anthony Albanese	2026-04-07; 2022	/	40% 59%	19%	39%	52% 18%	11%	7%	
Slovenia	Robert Golob	2025	700	39.8%	18.9%	20.9%	59.3%	16.9%	42.4%	
European Union	Ursula von der Leyen	2025		39%	8%	31%	43%			
Slovakia	Robert Fico	2025		39%	20%	19%	49%	16%	33%	
Philippines	Bongbong Marcos	2025-05-05	1200	39%	13%	26%	57%	17%	40%	
Sweden	Ulf Kristersson	2026-04-07; 2025	1011	38% 41%	8%	33%	54% 52%	31%	21%	
United States	Donald Trump	2026-04-07; 2025	3505	38% 42%	21%	21%	57% 58%	14%	44%	
Uruguay	Yamandú Orsi	2026-08-10	2046	37.5%	17.1%	20.4%	58.3%	20.1%	38.2%	
Italy	Giorgia Meloni	2024-04-23	2500	36.5%	24.8%	11.7%	63.3%	9.1%	54.2%	
Turkey	Recep Tayyip Erdoğan	2025		36% 42.8%	13.2%	29.6%	50% 57%			
Pakistan	Shehbaz Sharif	2025-06-15	2000	36%			61%			
Nicaragua	Daniel Ortega	2026-08-10	3225	36.0%	11.0%	25.0%	61.4%	17.8%	43.6%	
Gambia	Adama Barrow	2024–05-17	1200	35.7%	6.4%	29.3%	61.7%	35.8%	25.9%	
Argentina	Javier Milei	2026-08-10	4070	35.1%	9.5%	25.6%	62.8%	11.7%	51.1%	
Portugal	Luís Montenegro	2026-05-28; 2026-05-18	803; 606	35.0% 21.9%	3.1%	18.8%	41.5% 48.2%	32.2%	16.0%	
Belgium	Bart De Wever	2025		35%			54%			
Spain	Pedro Sánchez	2025-03-25	1068	35%	13%	22%	56%	15%	41%	
Congo-Brazzaville	Denis Sassou Nguesso	2024-10-16	1200	33.0%	9.1%	23.9%	64.0%	30.9%	33.1%	
Belarus	Alexander Lukashenko	2021-11-10	767 (Note: CAWI method, weighted)	32%			46%			
Israel	Benjamin Netanyahu	2024	738	32% >27.7	15.3%	12.4%	61% >57.2%	13.5%	43.7%	
Panama	José Raúl Mulino	2026-08-10	2025	31.4%	16.9%	14.5%	64.4%	19.1%	45.3%	
Georgia	Irakli Kobakhidze	2023		31%			62%			
South Africa	Cyril Ramaphosa	2025; 2022-12-19	1582	31% 29.7%	5.4%	24.3%	63% 63.9%	28.4%	35.5%	
Norway	Jonas Gahr Støre	2026-04-07		31%			63%			
Croatia	Andrej Plenković	2025		31%			64%			
Morocco	Aziz Akhannouch	2024-02-29	1200	30.1%	3.3%	26.8%	61.9%	29.7%	32.2%	
Latvia	Evika Siliņa	2025		30%			48%			
Guatemala	Bernardo Arévalo	2026-08-10	4024	29.5%	16.4%	13.1%	66.4%	24.4%	42.0%	
Cyprus	Nikos Christodoulides	2025		>29%			>50% (Note: 55% in a contemporary poll.)			
Austria	Christian Stocker	2025		29%			58%			
Netherlands	Rob Jetten	2026-04-07		28%			55%			
Estonia	Kristen Michal	2024	4001	27%			45%			
Greece	Kyriakos Mitsotakis	2025		27%			64%			
Venezuela	Delcy Rodríguez	2026-08-10	2633	26.7%	15.2%	11.5%	67.4%	28.8%	38.6%	
Angola	João Lourenço	2024–04-19	1200	26.5%	7.0%	19.5%	62.7%	31.8%	30.9%	
Germany	Friedrich Merz	2026-03-25	2420	26%	4%	22%	69%	25%	44%	
Finland	Petteri Orpo	2024	1034	>25%	5%	20%	>53%	26%	27%	
Sudan	Abdel Fattah al-Burhan	2022-12-30	1200	25.0%	10.6%	14.4%	72.4%	26.3%	46.1%	
North Macedonia	Hristijan Mickoski	2024	1479	24%	5%	19%	74%	21%	53%	
France	Emmanuel Macron	2026-03-25	1034	23%	3%	20%	76%	26%	50%	
Eswatini	Russell Dlamini	2025-05-17	1200	22.4%	2.9%	19.5%	41.3%	27.8%	13.5%	
Comoros	Azali Assoumani	2025-06-05	1200	20.9%	7.0%	13.9%	73.4%	25.7%	47.7%	
Tunisia	Kais Saied	2024-03-11	1200	20.4%	4.2%	16.2%	48.8%	20.0%	28.8%	
United Kingdom	Andy Burnham	2026-07-20	TBD	TBD	TBD	TBD	TBD	TBD	TBD	
Hong Kong	John Lee Ka-chiu	2025-05-20		19.4%			38.2%			
Nigeria	Bola Tinubu	2024-07-17	1600	14.2%	1.2%	13.1%	84.7%	36.2%	48.5%	
Palestine	Mahmoud Abbas	2024-06-12	790	12%			85%			
Cuba	Miguel Díaz-Canel	2026-07	1.318	3%			95%	22%	73%	

* Benin, Hungary, Lithuania, and Thailand should be updated soon.
