= Publicus Asia =

Polling survey company in the Philippines

- Company type: Advertizing and marketing
- Industry: Opinion polling
- Founded: 2003
- Founder: Maria Lourdes Tiquia, Lilibeth Amatong
- Headquarters: Pasig, Metro Manila, Philippines
- Area served: Philippines
- Website: publicusasia.com

Publicus Asia, Inc. (stylized as PUBLiCUS) is a public opinion polling body in the Philippines. Aside from market research, it also provides government relations, campaigns management, leadership skills training, and strategic communications services.

== History ==
Publicus was founded in 2003 by Maria Lourdes Tiquia, a political science graduate from the University of the Philippines Diliman, and Lilibeth Amatong, a graduate of communication arts at Maryknoll College Foundation.

In March 2023, Publicus Asia partnered with the University of Makati for a public briefing following a two-year COVID lockdown called PAHAYAG. It released PAHAYAG 2023 which surveyed government agencies in the area of delivery of services to the public.

=== Criticism ===
House Deputy Speaker Lito Atienza criticized Publicus Asia's political surveys, calling them biased and politically motivated. He argued that the surveys aim to create a "bandwagon" effect and should not be trusted. Publicus Asia, founded by Malou Tiquia, described its surveys as independent and non-commissioned, with the 2021 PAHAYAG Final List survey polling 1,500 respondents.

== See also ==
- Politics of the Philippines
