= List of Meitei-language films =

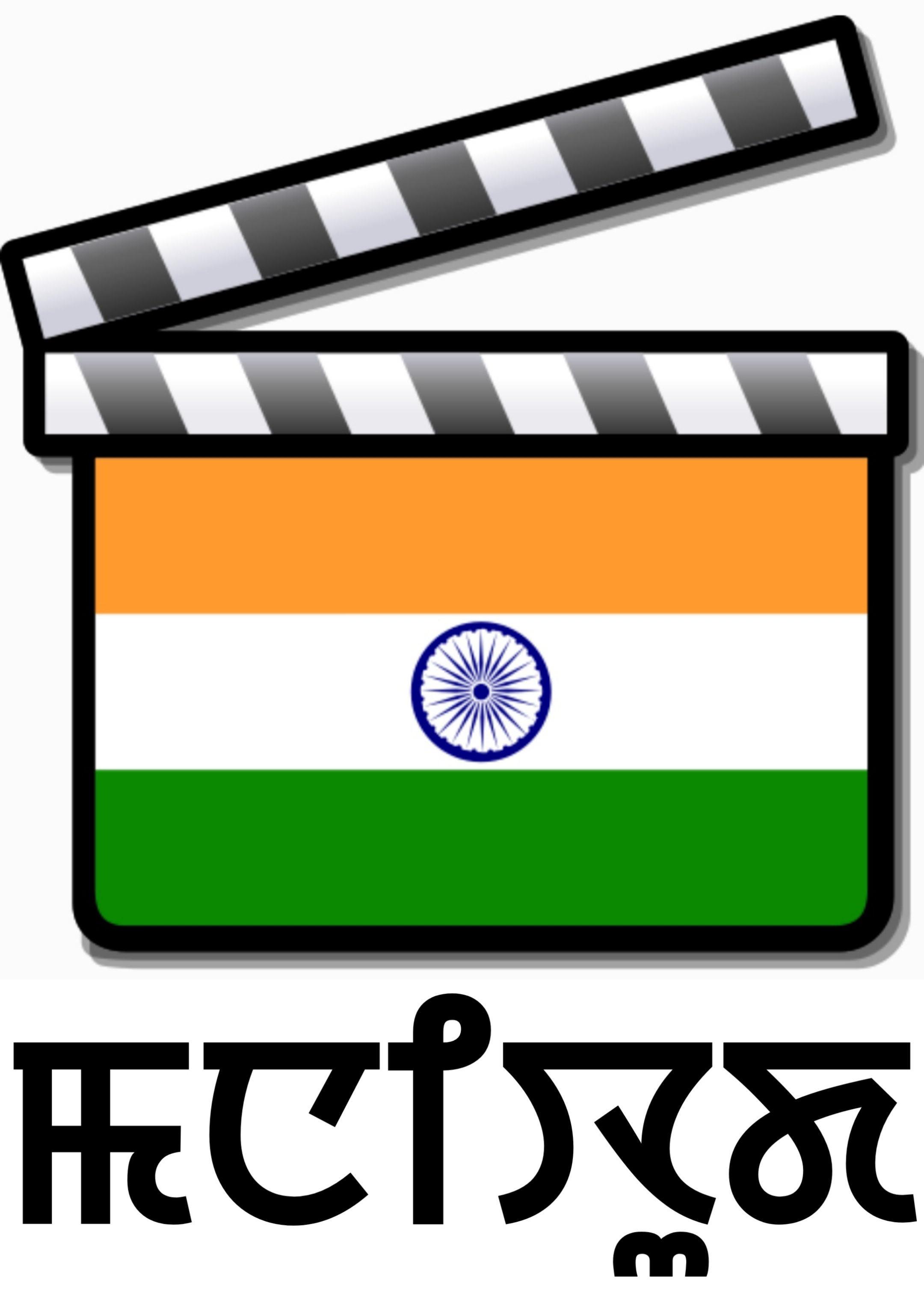
An illustration of the Maniwood clapperboard

The following is a list of notable films made in Meitei language (officially known as Manipuri language), by the Maniwood (Manipuri cinema industry), in alphabetical order.

== 0–9 ==
- 21st Century's Kunti
- 23rd Century: Ngasigee Matungda

== A ==
- Aabirkhan
- ABC Apang Budhu Crek
- Abethoi Angaobi
- Abok Natte Imani
- Achumba Paokhum (Basantagee Nongallamdai 3)
- AFSPA, 1958
- Ahangba Polang
- Ahing Amadi Houkhare
- Ahing Khuding
- Ahingba Phura
- Ahingee Tandan
- Ahingee Shingarei
- Akangba Nachom
- Akhunba Takhellei
- Akangba Pee
- Aliyah
- Amamba Lambee
- Amamba Sayon
- Amuk Luhongba Taraba
- Amukta Ani
- Amuktang Chamthoknashi
- Amuktang Ga Haikho
- Amuktang Punna Nokshi
- An Unknown Summer
- Andro Dreams
- Angaoba
- Angaobashu Thamoi Palli
- Ani x Ani = Mari
- Apaiba Leichil
- Apikpa Mahum
- Aronba Shaktam
- Aronba Wari
- Ashangba Nongjabi
- Ashaobagee Nungshiba
- Ashit Awanthada Pee Thadoi Ahum
- Athengbada Pharakpa Thabal
- Athengbadasu Thabal
- Atiyagee Meenok
- Auto Driver
- Awaiba Mapu

== B ==
- Bangladeshki Sana Tampha
- Basantagee Nongallamdai
- Bema Bema
- Beragee Bomb
- Beyond Blast
- Bloody Phanek
- Bomb Blast
- Boong
- Bora Uchi
- Border Dispute (Lamkhei Wathok)
- Brojendragee Luhongba

== C ==
- Chahidugi Yaoshang Tha
- Chakthekpee
- Chanu IPS 2
- Chaphu
- Chatledo Eidi
- Cheikhei
- Cheina
- Cheitheng
- Chinglen Sana
- Chinglensana
- Chirol
- Chow Chow Momo na Haobara Shingju Bora na Oinambara
- Chumthang Makhong

== D ==
- Dakpham
- Daughters of the Polo God
- Delhi Mellei
- Delusional Decays
- Dharmagi Mingda Imagidamak
- Dr. Hemogee Heloi

== E ==
- Ebungee Echal
- Echa
- Echan
- Echasa Epa Lamboirage
- Eedom Chatcharage
- Eema Laiphadibee
- Eerei
- Eereiduda
- Eewai
- Ei Actor Natte
- Ei Mamani
- Ei Mee Ki
- Ei Ngaode
- Eibu Hingkhora Eibu Sikhrora
- Eibusu Yaohanbiyu
- Eidee Chatle
- Eidee Kadaida
- Eidi Thamoi Pikhre
- Eigee Brother
- Eigee Morambee
- Eigee Punshi Mangla Taibangla
- Eigi Eralni
- Eigi Kona
- Eigi Nupi Tamnalai
- Eigidi Thawaini
- Eikhoi Pabunggi
- Eikhoigi Yum
- Eikhoishibu Kanano
- Eishe Kanano...!?
- Eisu Meeni
- Ekheng (Meehatpa 2)
- Ekhenglakta Kundo Pareng
- Ekhenglaktagi Red Rose
- Enakta Leiringei
- Engengi Nini Panba
- Eramdam (Kangla Karbar 2)

== F ==
- Faibok
- Fida
- Fireflies
- Fried Fish, Chicken Soup and a Premiere Show

== G ==
- Gaari Driver
- Govindagee Sharik Makhol

== H ==
- Hainabado Chumle
- Hangam Maru Pokhhaibi
- Hangningli Thamoisina
- Happugi Mondrang
- Hawker
- Hayengna Kanana Pangani
- Heinoujom Yumbal Tellanga Yahip
- Hero
- Highway 39: Punshi Lambida
- Highways of Life
- Hiktharaba Samji
- Hingbagee Mahao
- Hiktharaba Samji
- Hingchaba
- Hiyai
- Hoo Chaage
- Huranbado Mapuni

== I ==
- I Rise
- Ichadi Manini
- Iche Tampha
- Ima Machet Icha Tangkhai
- Ima Sabitri
- Imagee Ibungo
- Imagi Laman Singamdre
- Imagi Ningthem
- Imagi Sanathoi
- Imoinu
- Imphal Dagee Chennai
- Imphal Ningol
- Inamma
- Ingao Ngaona
- Inspector Yohenba
- Iron Women of Manipur
- Ishanou
- Itao Ibungo Nungsibee
- Iteima
- It's Not My Choice

== J ==
- Jam Makhong
- Jiri Leima Imphal Thoibi
- Joseph's Son

== K ==
- Kaboklei
- Kadarmapee
- Kangla Karabar
- Kaorage
- Keibu Keioiba
- Keishamthong Thoibi
- Kekoo Lotpee
- Khamba Thoibi
- Khallude
- Khangdreda Nongdamba
- Khoidouwa
- Khomei
- Khongfam
- Khonjel
- Khujingee Mami
- Khullaksha
- Khurai Angaobi
- Khutsha Ani
- Kokchak
- Kokchak Returns
- Kombeerei
- Kombirei
- Kum Kang Kum Kabi Chang

== L ==
- Laangoi
- Laibakkini Khallage
- Laigee Macha
- Laija Lembi
- Lakhipurgi Lakhipyari
- Lalhouba
- Lallasi Pal
- Laman Ama
- Lambidudei
- Lamja Parshuram
- Lamkhai
- Lamjasara
- Lammei
- Lammuknaraba Punshi
- Lamtagee Thangjada
- Langdai
- Langdai Ama
- Langla Langjin
- Langlen Thadoi
- Lanmei Thanbi
- Lanphamda Ibeni
- Lanthengminnakhisi
- Larei Lathup
- Leeklam
- Leepun
- Leibaklei
- Leichilakki Thaja
- Leichildagee Urok
- Leihourage
- Leihouroko
- Leikaigi Radha
- Leikang Thambal
- Leikanglada Yenning
- Leikhamton
- Leima
- Leipaklei
- Leiramkhige
- Leishabi Lamyoubee
- Leishna
- Lembi Leima
- Lengdaba Lan
- Liklaai
- Loibataare Ta Raju
- Loisinkhidraba Wari
- Loktak Lairembee
- Lonna Lonna
- Lonthoktabagee Wari
- Loukrakpam Ningol
- Luhongbagi Ahing

== M ==
- Maanja
- Madhabee
- Mageedamakni
- Magi Matambakta
- Maithakpi Chigonglei
- Makar
- Malla Malla Leinungshi
- Mama Taret
- Mamado Leisabido Angaobido
- Mamadusu Nupini
- Mamal Naidraba Thamoi
- Mami
- Mamigi Lairembee
- Mamoudo Hingchabido Manemdo
- Mana Lei
- Mangalsana
- Mangalsigee Ashada
- Manglanda Lak U Ko
- Manipur Express
- Manipuri Pony
- Mareibak Ningba Herachandra
- Marupki Marup
- Matamgi Manipur
- Mathang Mapokta
- Mayophygee Macha
- Meehatpa
- Meera Memcha
- Meiram - The Fire Line
- Meiranbi
- Meisa
- Meitan Araba
- Mellei Leishna Thariktha
- Mikuptudagee
- Mingsel
- Miraang
- Miss Manipur
- Mission Telheiba
- Mittrang Keithel
- Monna Sengao Lakpa
- Moreh Maru
- Mr. Khadang
- Mr. Lakhipyari
- Mutnaidraba Nungshiba
- My Japanese Niece

== N ==
- Naapal
- Nakenthana Ngairi
- Nangna Kappa Pakchade
- Nangna Nokpa Yengningi
- Nangi Chinghi Manam
- Nangbu Nungshiduna Hinglibani
- Nangtana Helli
- Naoshum
- Naughty Girls
- Ngaihak Lambida
- Ngaina Ngaina
- Ngamloi Eidi Kainaba
- Nine Hills One Valley
- Ningol Leima
- Ningtha
- Nobap
- Nongallabasu Thaballei Manam
- Nongallakpa
- Nongallamdaisida
- Nonglei
- Nongmadi Soidana
- Nongmatang
- Nongphadok Lakpa Atithi
- Numitlei
- Nungshi Feijei
- Nungshi Keithel
- Nungshi Lottery Phaorehe
- Nungshibana Loire
- Nungshibana Yeknahalle
- Nungshibeine Nungshimanbei
- Nungshibi Kabaw Valley
- Nungshit Mapi
- Nungshithoi Eigee Thoi

== O ==
- Octobee Natte
- Oiramle Mahaktumak
- Oitharei
- Olangthagee Wangmadasoo
- Oneness
- Orchids of Manipur

== P ==
- Paari
- Pabung Syam
- Padma Shri Wareppa Naba: Rituals to Mainstream
- Pakhang Sari
- Pallepfam
- Pambei
- Pamjabana Ngaojare
- Pandam Amada
- Pankhei
- Panthungee Wangmada
- Panthungeedara Nungshiba
- Paokhum
- Paokhum Ama
- Pari Imom
- Patkee Tharo
- Payal
- Phijigee Mani
- Phouoibee
- Phouoibi Shayon
- Piranglakta Manglan Ama
- Producer Director

== R ==
- Radha-Rani
- Rajarshi Bhagyachandra of Manipur
- Rongdaife

== S ==
- Saaphabee
- Saaramchat
- Sageigee Mouni
- Sanadi Sanani
- Sanahanbi
- Saklon Amada
- Samadon
- Sambal Wangma
- Sana Manbi Sanarei
- Sana Talloi
- Sanabi
- Sanagi Medal
- Sanagi Tangbal
- Sanakeithel
- Sanarik
- Sandhya Mamsillakle
- Sangbrei Managi Chenghi Manam
- Sathiba Danger
- Sayol Ahum
- Sekmai Turel
- Shak Henba Bhoot
- Shakhangdaba
- Shakhangnaba Numitta
- Shakthibee Tampha
- Shangkhraba Machu
- Shingnaba
- Spaced Out - Panthung Di Kadaaida!
- Sunita
- Surda Ngaojabee

== T ==
- Tabunungda Akaiba Likli
- Taibang Keithel
- Taionare
- Tales of Courage
- Tamoyaigee Ebecha
- Taningdre
- Taru Tarubi
- Taru Tarubi Maktabee
- Tayai
- Tellangga Mamei
- Thabum Tara
- Thajabagee Wangmada
- Thambal: The Legacy of Celestial Flower
- Thambal Leikhok
- Thamoi Kishi
- Thamoina Kari Hairi
- Thamoina Thamoida
- Thamoise Kaplakle
- Thang-Gee Maya
- Tharo Thambal
- Tharoi Ahambei Mahao
- Thasi Thanou
- Thawanmichakna Kenkhrabada
- The Foul Truth
- Thengmallabara Radhamanbi
- Thengnaramdraba
- Thoibee
- Thoicha
- Thokkidagi Kishi
- Thongnao Mayagee Gulap
- Thoudang
- Thouri
- Tillaikhombee
- Tingkhang
- Tomthin Shija
- Torban Amagi Wari
- Torei

== U ==
- Una Una
- Uoo Thambal
- Ureinung
- Utaangbi

== V ==
- VDF Thasana

== W ==
- Waashak
- Wahang
- Wakching Thagee Sanarei
- Wamei
- Wangma Wangma
- Wangma Wangmada
- Wanted Linthoi
- Wari Loidri
- Western Sankirtan
- Who Said Boys Can't Wear Makeup?

== Y ==
- Yaathang No. 1
- Yahouthengba Khoimu
- Yairipok Thambalnu
- Yaisa
- Yaiskulgee Pakhang Angaoba
- Yelhou Jagoi
- Yenning Amadi Likla
- Yotki Thamoi
- Yumleima Lamleima

== Chronological list ==
Release Date	Title	Director/Producer	Cast	Notes
February 7, 2022	Nangbu Ngairambane	Producer: Thoudam Ilendra Singh		
February 7, 2022	Ningol	Producer: Hanjabam Rishikesh Sharma		
February 8, 2022	Ashira Punshi	Producer: Sorokhaibam Manithoiba Singh		
February 11, 2022	Ingen Thagi Thanil	Producer: Moirangthem Binodini Devi		
April 4, 2022	Tharoi Ahambei Mahao	Director: Homeshwori Devi Khoibam; Producer: Ranjit Ningthouja		
April 4, 2022	Haidrasu Khangle	Producer: Rk Nungthilchaibi Chanu		Production house: Nongin Film Production
April 26, 2022	Esha Minai Oibige	Producer: Laishram Lalit Singh		
April 30, 2022	Manglangi Epaktuda	Producer: Moirangthem Joychand Singh		
April 30, 2022	Echa	Producer: Maibam Ashok Singh		
May 21, 2022	Apikpa Mahum (The Little Nest)	Producer: Meihoubam Dayashwor Singh		
May 21, 2022	Maikhum	Producer: Thiyam Gunachandra Singh		Production house: Big Cat Film Production
May 21, 2022	Khullaksha	Producer: Elangbam Barun Singh		Production house: Pibarel Films
May 21, 2022	Leirangi Leinam	Producer: Khumanthem Premila Devi		
August 3, 2022	Akangba Nachom	Producer: Thokchom Reshi Singh		
August 30, 2022	Thang Chani	Producer: Laishram Premananda Meitei		Production house: Suvakumar Film Production
September 6, 2022	Thamoigee Makhol	Producer: Thiyam Minakumar Singh		Production house: Langon Langdai Films Production
September 21, 2022	Laija Lembi	Producer: Kangjam Sudhir Singh		Production house: Sirius Films Production
September 21, 2022	Eraal Amana	Producer: Kshetrimayum Ramesh Singh		Production house: Taruni Film Production
September 26, 2022	Mei Eeshing	Producer: Kangjam Jogamani Singh		
September 26, 2022	Hoo Sangom	Producer: Longjam Sanamacha Devi		Production house: MPS Films
September 26, 2022	Imoinu - 2	Producer: Tarunkumar Heisnam		
September 29, 2022	Tantha (The Rhythm)	Producer: Paonam Kishan Mangang		
September 29, 2022	Leiyee Ani	Producer: Loitongbam Premjit Meitei		
September 29, 2022	Taxi Daa Thoibi	Producer: Chingshubam Niladhwaja Singh		
September 29, 2022	Nongmei Paiba Rapist	Producer: Konthoujam Robita Devi		
November 1, 2022	Samadon	Producer: Rajkumari Lakshmibai Devi		Production house: Ningthemcha Mayum Production
November 1, 2022	Tanggoi	Producer: Shagolshem Somchandra Singh		Production house: Sana Sangai Film Production
December 20, 2022	Mapi Lairik	Producer: Ningthouja Lanjenla Lancha		
December 22, 2022	Eigi Nupi Tamnalai	Producer: Chandam Yaima Devi		
December 23, 2022	Ashengba Eral	Producer: Kshetrimayum Subadani Devi		
December 28, 2022	Sajibugi Leihao	Producer: Takhellambamba Chandrakumar Singh		Production house: Home Films Manipur Production
Early 2025	Oneness	Director: Priyakanta Laishram		First mainstream Meitei film to explore LGBTQ+ identity; won the Special Jury Award (Feature Film) at the 2025 Manipuri State Film Awards.
28 March 2025	Madam Shija	—		A feature film that had theatrical release and pre-bookings across Manipur.
June 2025	Hiyainu	—		A feature film that completed its theatrical rollout mid-year.
2025 (extended run); 6 March 2026	Boong	Director: Lakshmipriya Devi	Bala Hijam, Chiranjan Thiyam	Acclaimed coming-of-age drama that continued its global footprint into 2025, winning a BAFTA for Best Children's & Family Film.
Late 2025	Oitharei (Save My Soul)	Director: Dinesh Naorem		102-minute feature tackling the human cost of the Manipur conflict; officially selected for the Indian Panorama section at the 56th IFFI.
Late 2025; 20 June 2026	Battlefield (Documentary)	Director: Borun Thokchom		80-minute documentary exploring the local perspective of WWII's Battle of Imphal; selected for the non-feature section at IFFI.
October 2025	Loukrakpam Ningol	Director: Thoiba Soibam		Produced by CARB Pictures; received its official premiere and screening at the MSFDS auditorium.
9 January 2026	Una Una			
18 March 2026	Laininghal Naoria Phullo			
29 March 2026	Tamphamani			
4 April 2026	Sana Talloi		Sur Athokpam, Ethoi Oinam, Angel Shimrah	
5 April 2026	Loktak Paatki Lily	Director: I.S. Gurung	Dayananda, Jiteshwori, Ethoi Oinam	
15 May 2026	Phouoibee (The Goddess of Paddy)	Director: Rakesh Moirangthem		
22 June 2026	The Sangai (Documentary)	Director: Akanksha Sood Singh		
TBA	Torei 2: Nang Nabuk Phatte	Director: Khwairakpam Bishwamittra	Devita Urikhimbam, Gokul Anand	
TBA	Tahallo Waheido			
TBA	Rongdaife			
TBA	Nungshi Maithong	Director: Bobby Haobam		

== See also ==
- Directorate of Language Planning and Implementation
