= List of Meitei-language films of 2013 =

Meiteilon films released in 2013

This is a list of films in Meiteilon (Manipuri) released in 2013.

Each and every movie released in 2013 may not be mentioned due to lack of information. Chow Chow Momo na haobara Shingju Bora na oinambara, Thabaton, Beragee Bomb, Dr. Hemogee Heloi, Tabunungda Akaiba Likli, Tamoyaigee Ebecha and Mounao Thoibi were some of the popular films of the year.

== Releases ==
Date of release	Title	Director	Cast	Studio (Production House)	Ref.
2 February	Ngarakpi	Geet Gulapee	Motibala, Roshan Pheiroijam, R.K. Sorojini, Hijam Shyamdhani, Shanti Raj	Radha Govind Films	
	Ani X Ani = Mari	Jeetendra Ningomba	Leishangthem Tonthoi, Soma Laishram, Joseph Thokchom, Surjit Saikhom, Deky Khundrakpam, Leishangthem Rahul, Tayenjam Mema, Sanatomba Sharma	Dew Films	
	Chahi Taramari	G. Amir	Kaiku Rajkumar, Sushmita Mangsatabam, Motibala, Shougrakpam Hemanta, Ratan Lai	Aryan Films	
	Thabaton	Bijgupta Laishram	Kaiku Rajkumar, Gokul Athokpam, Sushmita Mangsatabam, R.K. Hemabati, Sagolsem Dhanamanjuri, Narendra Ningomba, Irom Shyamkishore, Heisnam Geeta, Ghanashyam, Elangbam Indu, SP Ingocha Yanglem, Rojesh Saikhom, Moirangthem Sunil Myboy, Philem Puneshori	BB Films	
	Mission Telheiba	Amarjeet Rajkumar	Mahes Thounaojam, Artina Thoudam, Vidyananda Laishram, Ratan Lai, Idhou	Green Chillies Films	
	Dr. Hemogee Heloi	Homen D' Wai	Kaiku Rajkumar, Artina Thoudam, Sonia Hijam, Ibomcha, R.K. Sanajaoba, Laishram Lalitabi, Tayenjam Mema, Idhou, Chaiba, Apsara Anoubam	Penu Leima Films	
	Pambei	Maibam Bankim	Universe Hidangmayum, Satyabati, Ibomcha, Thongam Thoithoi, Huirem Manglem, Laimayum Gaitri, Gurumayum Ananta, Irom Shyamkishore, Sophia Sapam, Loveboy	Loveboy Films	
	Thajagee Maihing	Romi Meitei	Gokul Athokpam, Bala Hijam, Soma Laishram, Gurumayum Bonny, Roshan Pheiroijam, R.K. Hemabati, Thingom Pritam, Guna Hidangmayum	Sagapam Films	
21 September	Tabunungda Akaiba Likli	Romi Meitei	Gokul Athokpam, Abenao Elangbam, Artina Thoudam, Gurumayum Priyogopal, Thoudam Ongbi Modhubala, Deky Khundrakpam	Pibarel Films	
30 October	Ureinung	Pilu Heigrujam	Leishangthem Rahul, Sonia Samjetsabam, Heisnam Ongbi Indu, Denny Likmabam, Chitra Pangambam, Bebeto, Raj Elangbam	Bandana Films	
31 August	Beragee Bomb	Oinam Gautam Singh	Gurumayum Bonny, Leishangthem Tonthoi, Edwin Soibam, Suraj Sharma Laimayum, Mukabala (Loya), Ratan Lai, Surjit Saikhom	Chingkhurakpa Art	
	Sangbrei Managi Chenghi Manam	Romi Meitei	Rahul Leishangthem, Abenao Elangbam, Roshan Pheiroijam, Laimayum Gunabati, Thingom Pritam, Sophia Sapam	Mema Films	
	Laai Khutsaangbi	Luching Luwang	Gurumayum Bonny, Abenao Elangbam, Artina Thoudam		
	Lumfoo Tomba	Bimol Phibou	Gokul Athokpam, Sushmita Mangshatabam, Apsara Anoubam, Leishangthem Rahul, R.K. Hemabati, Jenifer Loukham, Idhou, Praphullo	Nonglei Films	
	Lingjel	Jeetendra Ningomba	Aphao, Bala Hijam, Leishangthem Rahul, Ayekpam Shanti, Irom Shyamkishore, Khonykar Khuraijam, Ratan Lai	Marc Film Division	
2 November	Mounao Thoibi	Romi Meitei	Gurumayum Bonny, Bala Hijam, Roshan Pheiroijam, Surjit Saikhom, Thokchom Ibomcha, Sweety, Bijenmala, Takhellambam Lokendra, Thoudam Ongbi Modhubala, Gurumayum Priyogopal, Jenny	RT Films	
	Meehatpa 2 (Ekheng)	Ksh. Kishorekumar	Mahes Thounaojam, Momoco Khangembam, Bala Hijam, Arun, Ratan Lai, Basan Lukok, Sunny Naoshekpan, Tayenjam Mema, SP Ingocha Yanglem	Ta-Ahal Films	
	Wamei	Paojel	Kaiku Rajkumar, Bala Hijam, Heisnam Geeta		
	Kangla Karbar 2 (Eramdam)	Subash Pebia	Joseph Thokchom, Laimayum Gaitri, Kaiku Rajkumar, Sonia Hijam, Irom Shyamkishore, Sagolsem Dhanamanjuri, Thokchom Ibomcha, Heisnam Geeta		
	Kundorei	Homen D' Wai	Gokul Athokpam, Bala Hijam, Artina Thoudam, Y. Kumarjit, Tayenjam Mema	Penu Leima Films	
	Lanngamba	Warjeet Moirangthem	Kaiku Rajkumar, Sonia Hijam, Sushmita Mangshatabam, Laimayum Gaitri, Tayenjam Mema, Joshep Thokchom, Heisnam Geeta	Sanjita Films	
27 October	Chow Chow Momo na haobara Shingju Bora na oinambara	R.K. Jiten	Gurumayum Bonny, Bala Hijam, Sushmita Mangshatabam, R.K. Hemabati, Takhellambam Lokendra, Heisnam Geeta, Ayekpam Shanti, Abung Dang	Leishangthem Films	
27 December	Tamoyaigee Ebecha	Pilu Heigrujam	Gurumayum Bonny, Bala Hijam, Sonia Hijam, Vidyananda Laishram, Laishram Lalitabi, Wangkhem Lalitkumar, Narendra Ningomba, Philem Puneshori	Lainingthou Lam Ahingba Films	
	80,000 Meiraba Romio	Premanda	Gokul Athokpam, Abenao Elangbam, Huirem Seema	IP Films	
	Sanadi Sanani	Khoibam Homeshwori	Sana, AB, Tonthoi Leishangthem, Soma Laishram, Idhou, Laishram Lalitabi, Khoibam Homeshwori, Ningthouja Jayvidya, Tayenjam Mema	Home Films	
14 December	Nangna Kappa Pakchade	Makhonmani Mongsaba	Tonthoi Leishangthem, Leibaksemba, Denny Likmabam, R.K. Sorojini	P.K. Films	
7 December	Amamba Sayon	Johnson Mayanglambam	Gurumayum Bonny, Tonthoi Leishangthem, Soma Laishram, Tayenjam Mema, Huirem Seema	Leimakol Art	
	Leihouroko	Amar Raj	Kaiku Rajkumar, Abenao Elangbam, Premeshori	Ocean Films Division	
	Ngaina Ngaina	OC Meira	Yumnam Arun, Jolly Irungbam, Sonia Hijam, Ratan Lai, Reshmi Sorokhaibam	Ipak Films	
	Yotshabee Makhong Ahum	L. Rajesh	Bikramjit, Naoba, Umajit, Soma Laishram, Motibala, Y. Kumari, Shyambabu, Moirangthem Sunil Myboy, Idhou, L. Prakash, Shyam	Toijam CD Parlour Production	
20 December	Bora Uchi	Dhanaraj Khomdram	Mahesh Thounaojam, Apsara Anoubam, Irom Shyamkishore, Tayenjam Mema, Ratan Lai	Poireinganbi Films	
30 December	Houkhodana Ta Raghuda	Utam & Warjit	Gurumayum Bonny, Abenao Elangbam, Merina Laishangbam, Basan Lukok, Thokchom Ibomcha	Ima Thumkhong Lairembi Films	
