= List of Meitei-language films of 2019 =

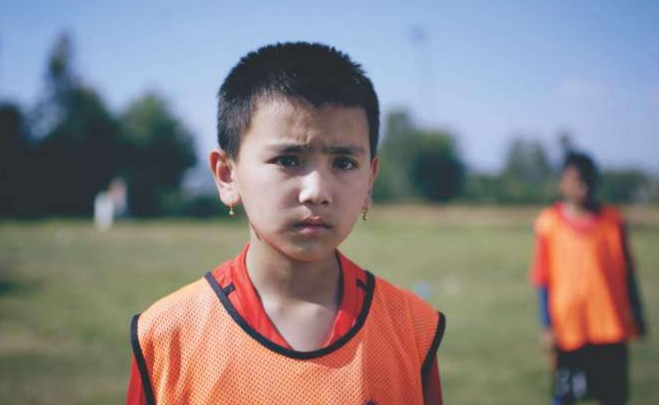
The Tainted Mirror — Meitei language cinema — Directed by Romi Meitei

It is a list of films in Meiteilon (Manipuri) released in 2019, certified by the Central Board of Film Certification (CBFC).

Some of them made entries in the prestigious national and international film festivals of 2019 and 2020 and won awards. Eigi Kona, Eikhoishibu Kanano, Nongphadok Lakpa Atithi, and Pandam Amada are such films of 2019.

== January–March ==
Certification date		Title	Director	Cast	Studio (Production house)	Ref.
F E B	7	Kundose Nanginee	Ningthou Ranjan	Dayananda Leishangthem; Nicky Sorokhaibam; Hamom Sadananda; Idhou; Ratan Lai	Lang Ngon Ningthou Films	
F E B	8	Thamoina Thamoida	Ojitbabu Ningthoujam	Silheiba Ningthoujam; Biju Ningombam; Dayananda Leishangthem	Huidruba Films	
F E B	20	Shiki Ibobi	Bimol Phibou	Kaiku Rajkumar; Sushmita Mangsatabam	Chin Films	
F E B	22	Ningthiba Nonglik	M. Nirmala Chanu	Gurumayum Bonny; Soma Laishram; Sagar Sorensangbam	GDSK Films	
M A R	30	Mamadusu Nupini	Kepidas	Roshan Pheiroijam; Gepelina Mayanglambam; Khaba; Sanjana Likmabam	Rajkumar Films	

== April–June ==
Certification date		Title	Director	Cast	Studio (Production house)	Ref.
A P R	12	Nongbalgee Jacket	Bimol Phibou	Gokul Athokpam; Biju Ningombam; Sushitra Wangkhem; Araba Laitonjam; Jenny Khurai; L. Prakash	Taorem Films	
A P R	30	Yengdaba Ngamde	Luching Luwang	Sunny Naoshekpam; Sushitra Wangkhem; Gurumayum Bonny	Luching Productions	
M A Y	28	Amada Mari	Bachan Chongtham	Artina Thoudam; AB; Dona; Kaiku Rajkumar; Jeenita	Father Mother Films	
M A Y	30	Da Nongdamba	Nasha	Gokul Athokpam; Biju Ningombam	R.C. Films	
M A Y	30	Inamma	Homeshwori	Gokul Athokpam; Bala Hijam; Gurumayum Bonny; Devita Urikhinbam; Biju Ningombam; Silheiba Ningthoujam	Home Films	
J U N E	13	Thamoi Kishi	O. Gautam	Biju Ningombam; Silheiba Ningthoujam	Pros and Cons Films	

== July–September ==
Certification date		Title	Director	Cast	Studio (Production house)	Ref.
J U L Y	23	Ichadi Manini	Geet Yumnam	Bala Hijam; Amar Mayanglambam; Denny Likmabam; Ningthoujam Rina	MS Films	
J U L Y	24	Eise Nanggi Nattabara	Haobam Pamheiba	Silheiba Ningthoujam; Artina Thoudam; Sunny Naoshekpam	Evening Star Films	
J U L Y	24	Eikhoishibu Kanano	Ajit Yumnam	Irom Mangi; Sangeeta; Nandakumar Nongmaithem; Joyson Khapai	Skyline Pictures	
J U L Y	25	Yaisa	Rems Longjam	Avi Khundrakpam; Soma Laishram; Singsing Panmei	Blue Leaf Pictures	
J U L Y	26	Nongphadok Lakpa Atithi	Aribam Syam Sharma	Lairenjam Olen; Ningthoujam Rina	Doordarshan Kendra Guwahati	
A U G	20	Pandam Amada	Oinam Gautam Singh	Bonney Takhelmayum; Archana Konsam	Takhel Films	
A U G	22	Laal Nang Loikhinu	Rajen Leishangthem	Silheiba Ningthoujam; Biju Ningombam; Hamom Sadananda	Umaibee Films	
S E P T	09	Korounganba 3	Ojitbabu Ningthoujam	Gokul Athokpam; Silheiba Ningthoujam; Abenao Elangbam; Sonia Samjetsabam	Manira Movies	
S E P T	11	Mr. Mangal	Ojitbabu Ningthoujam	Silheiba Ningthoujam; Biju Ningombam; Amar Mayanglambam	MPS Films	
S E P T	11	Namase Chaphu Huranbini	Herojit Naoroibam	Araba Laitonjam; Bala Hijam; Suraj Ngashepam; Nicky Sorokhaibam	Taruni Films	
S E P T	11	Wakchingi Len	Bijgupta Laishram	Silheiba Ningthoujam; Bala Hijam; Arun Yumnam; Denny Likmabam	Lainingthou Lam Ahingba Film Industry	
S E P T	11	Thawai Mirel	Bishwamittra	Biju Ningombam; Bebeto; Jasmin Elangbam; Denny Likmabam	Bebeto Cine World	
S E P T	12	Ningthou	Geet Yumnam	Khaba; Soma Laishram; Nicky Sorokhaibam	Yek Salai Films	
S E P T	26	Thabaton 3	Bijgupta Laishram	Sushmita Mangsatabam; Kaiku Rajkumar; Bala Hijam; Gepelina Mayanglambam; Silheiba Ningthoujam; Biju Ningombam; Bijendra Laishram	BB Films	
S E P T	26	Ibung-Gee Ibemma	Sanaton Nongthomba	Gurumayum Bonny; Sushmita Mangsatabam; Silheiba Ningthoujam; Biju Ningombam	Palem Panthou Films	
S E P T	26	Mamal Naidraba Thamoi	Gyanand	Jamz Saikhom; Bala Hijam	Roma Productions	

== October–December ==
Certification date		Title	Director	Cast	Studio (Production house)	Ref.
O C T	15	Ei Actor Natte	Homen D' Wai	Silheiba Ningthoujam; Biju Ningombam	Imphal Star Films	
O C T	16	Mutlamdai Thaomei	Sudhir Kangjam	Silheiba Ningthoujam; Gokul Athokpam; Avi Khundrakpam; Bala Hijam; Ithoi Oinam	Sirius Films	
O C T	16	Tangna Phangjaba Lan	Fifi Mangang	Gurumayum Bonny; Frank; Abenao Elangbam	Nandeibam Films	
O C T	17	Eerei	Krishnakumar Gurumayum	Gokul Athokpam; Sagar Sorensangbam; Bala Hijam; Billa Ngathem	GDSK Films	
O C T	17	Boiton Lakle	Homeshwori	Arbin; Sushmita Mangsatabam; Idhou	Home Films	
O C T	17	Chaphu	Satyajit BK	Bala Tensubam; Ningthoukhongjam Bobo; Idhou; Gurumayum Priyogopal	Sakhi Shija Films	
O C T	23	Hanjin Hanjin	Kepidas	Nirmal Kangjam; Gepelina Mayanglambam; Sanjana Likmabam	Lucky 7 Star	
O C T	23	Chanu IPS 2	Sanaton Nongthomba	Gokul Athokpam; Soma Laishram; Bala Hijam	Nongthombam Films	
O C T	24	Nungshi Effect	Chou-En-Lai	Mukabala (Loya) Maibam; Sanjana Likambam	One Shot Films	
O C T	24	Leikai Pakhang	Kshetri Shanta	Gokul Athokpam; Moirangthem Sunil Myboy; Gepelina Mayanglambam	Lainingthou Films	
D E C	02	Eigi Kona	Bobby Wahengbam; Maipaksana Haorongbam	Sinam Shaolin; Prafullo Chandra; Leishangthem Tonthoingambi Devi; Ayekpam Shanti; Romesh Elangbam	Luwang Apokpa Mamikol Productions	
D E C	12	Bigo Live Amada	Bimol Phibou	Gurumayum Bonny; Silheiba Ningthoujam; Biju Ningombam	Thangjam Films	
D E C	17	Cha Hotel	R.K. Ruhi	Sunny Naoshekpam; Sushitra Wangkhem; Eshita Yengkhom; Redy Yumnam	Huiningshumbam Films	
D E C	23	Education Da Mai Onsillase	Rojendrakar Nongthomba; K. Obit	Biju Ningombam	Top Toppa Films	
D E C	23	Bangladeshki Sana Tampha	OC Meira	Gurumayum Bonny; Abenao Elangbam; Narmada Sougaijam; Bala Tensubam; Gepelina Mayanglambam; Ashok Seleibam	Ipak Films	
D E C	23	Thamoi Ani	Kepidas	Nirmal Kangjam; Bala Hijam	Lucky 7 Star	
D E C	23	Nang Gee Khongthang	Jeet Mangang	Roshan Pheiroijam; Ithoi Oinam	Mangang Films Private Limited	
