= Oinam Lukhoi =

Oinam Lukhoi (ꯑꯣꯏꯅꯥꯝ ꯂꯨꯈꯣꯏ) may refer to:

- Oinam Lukhoi Singh: Indian politician.
- Chana Lukhoi (originally, Oinam Lukhoi): Indian playwright, folk narrator, and cultural activist.
