= Gurumayum Bonny =

Indian actor from Manipur

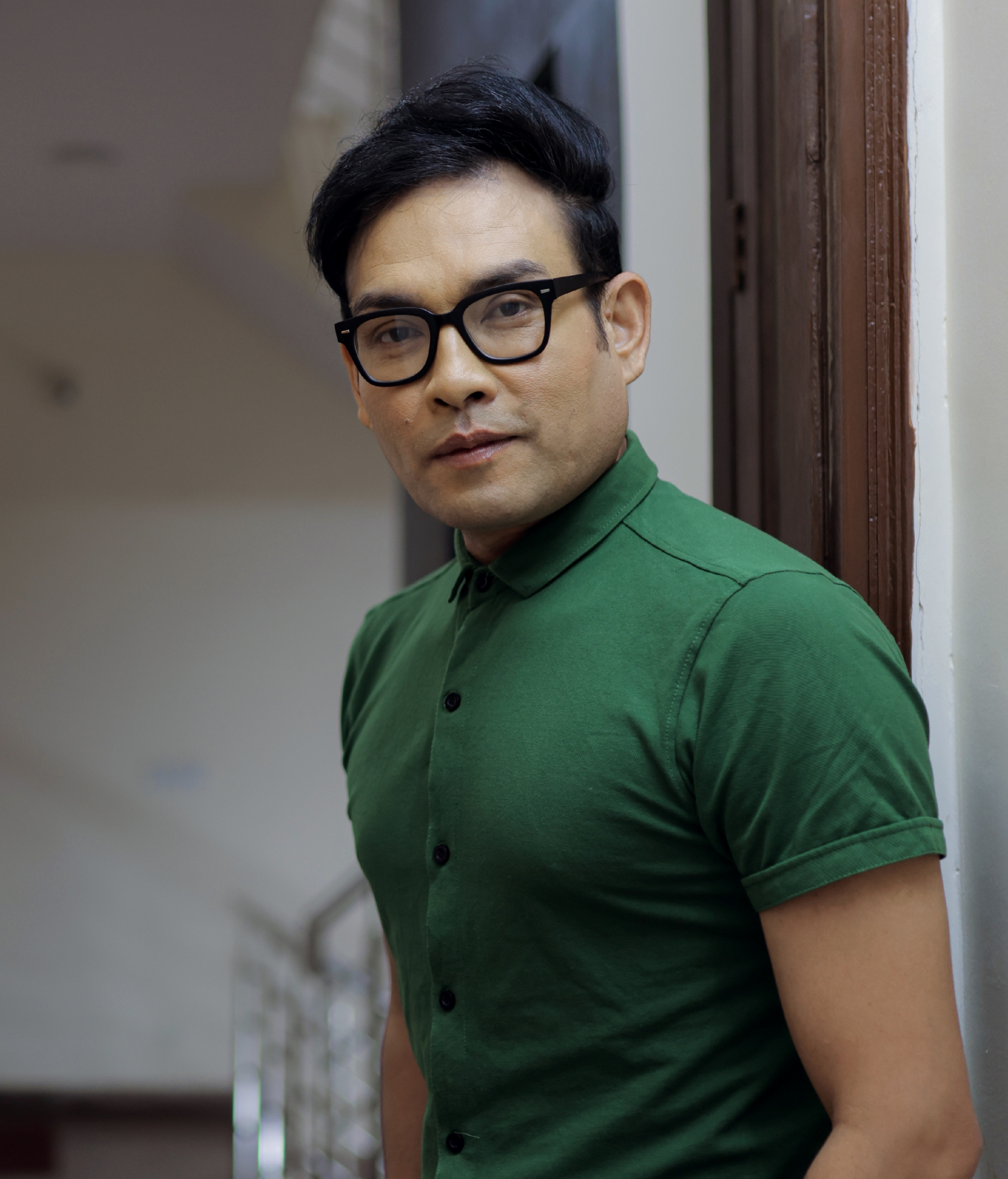
- Gurumayum Bonny Sharma
- Born: 27 May; Imphal, Manipur
- Occupations: Actor, Singer
- Spouse: Motibala
- Children: 2
- Parent(s): Gurumayum Robindro Sharma; Gurumayum Ongbi Surjamukhi Devi

Gurumayum Bonny Sharma is an Indian actor and singer who predominantly appears in Manipuri films. He is a resident of Keishamthong Maning Longjam Leikai, Imphal, Manipur. He has also worked in the Shumang Kumheis including Kunti series, Nongallamdaisida, Opium War, and Pizza.

== Career ==
Bonny had tried many jobs before coming into the world of performing arts. In 1994-95, he joined Bashikhong Dramatic Union. Later, he was a theatre artist for around ten years in Panthoibi Natya Mandir. Before coming into films, he had already acted in Shumang Kumheis. Aruba Eechel, Amamba Lambee, Kunti 6 (Mihatpung), Nongallamdaishida, Yeningthana Ngairi, Opium War and Pizza are his famous Shumang Leelas. Both his parents were also theatre artist in the Manipur Dramatic Union (MDU).

His first film is Lanmei Thanbi where he played a villain role, alongside Kaiku Rajkumar and Abenao Elangbam. He is best known for his role as Yo Sanatombi in the film Yaiskulgee Pakhang Angaoba. Other famous films of Bonny are Nungshibase Phagi Natte, VDF Thasana, Beragee Bomb, Chow Chow Momo na haobara Shingju Bora na oinambara, Yaiphare Yaiphare, Amamba Sayon, Western Sankirtan, Delhi Mellei and Mr. Khadang.

In the movie Ningtha, he played a disabled guy. He played double roles in the film Chow Chow Momo na haobara Shingju Bora na oinambara. In Producer Director, he was given the role of a film maker named Tomthin Cameroon. He portrayed the role of a mentally different guy in Tamoyaigee Ebecha.

VDF Thasana is a movie of his own home production. He is well known for his unique acting skills and humour in Manipuri films.

== Accolades ==
Bonny was honoured with different titles at several film awards.

Award	Category	Film	Ref.
7th RJ Film Vision Special Award 2012-13	Best Actor	–	
8th Manipur State Film Festival 2013	Best Actor in a Lead Role - Male	Yaiskulgee Pakhang Angaoba	
2nd SSS MANIFA 2013	Best Actor in a Leading Role - Male	Western Sankirtan	
9th Manipur State Film Awards 2014	Best Male Playback Singer for the song Ha Ha Tomal	VDF Thasana	
3rd SSS MANIFA 2014	Best Actor in a Negative Role	Beragee Bomb	
6th SSS MANIFA 2017	Best Actor in a Negative Role	Khongfam	
8th SSS MANIFA 2019	Best Actor in a Lead Role - Male	Eina Fagi Touraga	
14th Manipur State Film Awards 2022	Best Supporting Actor - Male	Nongallamdaisida	
17th Manipur State Film Awards 2025	Best Actor in a Supporting Role - Male	Laangoi	

== Selected filmography ==
Year	Film	Role	Director	Notes
2008	Lanmei Thanbi	Thomba	Chou En Lai & O. Mangi	Debut Film
2009	Panthungee Wangmada	Yoiheiba	Yoimayai Mongsaba	
2011	Phijigee Mani	Sanajaoba	O. Gautam	
2011	Khujingee Mami	Yaima	Romi Meitei	
2011	Mongpham	Achouba	Lai Jiten	
2011	Punshi Chuppa Nangshe Eigini	Chingkhei's friend	Premanda	
2011	Yaiskulgee Pakhang Angaoba	Sanatombi	Homen D' Wai	Best Actor - Leading Role
2011	Thabalgee Mangal	Thougan	Bimol Phibou	
2012	Yaiphare Yaiphare	Khambi	Bimol Phibou	
2012	Africa Leishabi	Imoba	Pilu H.	
2012	Lamjasara	Poirei	L. Prakash	
2012	Pabunggi Cycle	Sanggai	Bimol Phibou	
2012	Western Sankirtan	Rockychand	L. Prakash	Best Actor - Leading Role
2012	Director Producer	Tomthin Cameroon	L. Prakash	
2012	Lal Leipakta Laiphao	Phairenjao	L. Prakash	
2013	Chow Chow Momo na haobara Shingju Bora na oinambara	Mani	R.K. Jiten	
2013	Beragee Bomb	Manibabu	O. Gautam	
2013	Mounao Thoibi	Pheijao	Romi Meitei	
2013	Tamoyaigee Ebecha	Tamoyai	Pilu H.	
2013	Amamba Sayon	Punshiba Nepram	Johnson Mayanglambam	
2014	VDF Thasana	Thasana	Homen D' Wai	Best Male Playback Singer
2014	Delhi Mellei	Tomthin	Ajit Ningthouja	
2014	Hawker	Ngouba	Suvas E.	
2014	23rd Century: Ngasigee Matungda	Ningthem	Dinesh Tongbram	
2015	Kombeerei	Keiraba	Bijgupta Laishram	
2015	Waarookok	Ikhomba	Santa Potsangbam	
2015	Cheikhei	Khamba	Premkumar Paonam	
2015	Ikaibana Sire	Lammei	L. Prakash	
2015	Kum Kang Kum Kabi Chang	Shougrakpam Khoimu	Bishwamittra	
2015	Nungshi Feijei	Meiraba	Chou En Lai	
2016	Angangba Mayek (Pizza 2)	Ngamba	Dinesh Tongbram	
2016	Nungshi Feijei 2	Meiraba	Chou En Lai	
2016	Thanil (Pizza 3)	Ngamba	Dinesh Tongbram	
2016	Moreh Maru	Manibabu	O. Gautam	
2016	Khongfam	Ningthem	Sudhir Kangjam	Best Actor - Negative Role
2017	Ningthem Nite	Ningthem	Ksh. Kishorekumar	
2017	Eigee Tolangou	Tolangou	Kepidas	
2017	Itao Ibungo Nungsibee	Ashibagee Lai	Eepu	
2017	Nupi		Bobby Haobam	
2017	Speedbreaker	Punshiba	Bobby Haobam	
2017	Mr. Khadang	Maibam Mani Meitei	Chou En Lai	
2017	Ningtha	Thoiba	Homen D' Wai	
2018	Faibok	Thanil	Bimol Phibou	
2018	Eina Fagi Touraga	Tondang	Ajit Ningthouja	Best Actor - Lead Role
2018	Aliyah	Leishabi	Yoimayai Mongsaba	
2018	Awunpot	Langlen's husband	Santikumar Thounaojam	
2019	Ningthiba Nonglik	Malang/Achouba	M. Nirmala Chanu	
2019	MOU	Achouba	Chou-En-Lai	
2019	Inamma	Ngahakchao	Homeshwori	
2019	Ibung-gee Ibemma	Ibochouba	Sanaton Nongthomba	
2019	Tangna Phangjaba Lan	Nonggren	Fifi Mangang	
2019	Bigo Live Amada	Punshiba	Bimol Phibou	
2020	15 August: A Love Story		Krishnand Ningombam	
2020	Bangladeshki Sana Tampha		OC Meira	
2021	Ima Machet Icha Tangkhai	Sanahal	Homeshwori	
2021	Nungshi Keithel	Amei Keishing	Mangal Chabungbam	
2022	Nongallamdaisida	Angamba	O. Gautam	Best Supporting Actor (Male)
2022	Nangbu Ngairambane	Chaoba	Rajen Leishangthem	
2024	Laangoi	OC Moramba	Manoranjan Longjam	Best Supporting Actor (Male)
2024	Una Una	Dr. Pothe	Irel Luwang	
2025	Sunita	Sarat	Ajit Yumnam	
Upcoming	Laiki		Inaocha Khundrakpam	
