= OC Meira =

Indian filmmaker (born 1977)

OC Meira, also known as Oinamcha Meira (Meitei: ꯑꯣꯏꯅꯥꯝꯆꯥ ꯃꯩꯔꯥ, born 19 August 1977), is an Indian filmmaker, journalist, and creative writer from Manipur. He is known for directing several Meitei language short and feature films and for his involvement in Meitei literature and journalism.

== Early life and family ==
OC Meira was born on 19 August 1977 in Chana Mayai Leikai, Imphal East, Manipur. His father is Oinam Lukhoi (also known as Chana Lukhoi) and his mother is Oinam Ongbi Nungthinchaibi (also called Chana Lembi). He is married to Rajkumari Vijaya Sana, and they have a child named Lucent Oinam.

Meira's father, Chana Lukhoi, was a well-known artist in Shumang Leela (traditional Meitei courtyard theatre). Many famous artists who performed roles such as Jagat Singh, Bira Singh, Abirkhan, and Cheitei visited their home to learn from his father. As a young boy, Meira often watched these artists perform and imitated their actions with his friends, which inspired his early interest in theatre and performance.

=== Education ===
OC Meira completed a Master of Arts (MA) in Manipuri from Assam University, Silchar.

=== Early interests ===
In his youth, Meira actively took part in local functions, skits, and community programs. He was often involved in organizing games like tambola, making announcements in public programs, and helping in local events. His regular presence in community activities helped him develop skills in performance and communication.

=== Early career ===
Before becoming a filmmaker, Meira explored different artistic and cultural activities. He worked as a priest for the Meitei community, performed in Wari Leeba storytelling programs, wrote prose and poems, worked as a journalist, drew artistic sketches, wrote song lyrics, and acted in plays and Shumang Leela performances.

Despite trying many fields, Meira eventually chose filmmaking and writing as his main professions.

== Journalism and literary work ==
Meira has been active in Manipuri journalism and literature.

=== Editorial work ===
- Editor-in-Chief – IPAK (monthly Manipuri journal)
- Editor – Ngaklou (Manipuri literary journal)
- Former Editor – Manipuri (journal of Assam University)
- Board Member – Neinarol (Manipuri literary journal)
- Former Sub-editor – Matamgi Yakairol (Manipuri daily newspaper)

=== Published books ===
- Ayukki Atiya (poems, 2007)
- Kaidongpham (essays, 2008)
- Saktam Khara Wakhallon Khara (essays, 2011)

=== Artistic and organizational roles ===
OC Meira is an approved artist of All India Radio Imphal. He is the founder secretary of:

- Ipak Film Production
- Patriotic Writers' Forum Manipur (PAWF)
- Sangai Film Production

He is also a member of several organizations, including:

- Film Directors' Guild Manipur
- Biramangol College Alumni Association
- Writers' Forum Imphal
- Ashei Waphong Yokkhat Lup
- Sheihek Sheireng Sheipan Semgat Lup
- All Manipur Working Journalists Union
- All India Youth Federation, Manipur State Council

== Film career ==
=== Beginning ===
OC Meira began his film career in 2010 when he directed his first Manipuri short film Kathokpagi Saklon, produced by Rakesh Naorem. After receiving appreciation for this film, Meira directed several other short films, including Sageigi Sanaarei, Tollabasinggi Tolen and Numit Mana Tadringei. He later directed more than eight feature films, becoming one of the active filmmakers in Manipuri digital cinema.

=== Feature films directed ===
Some of his known films include Sakhenbi Iteima, Phongdoknadringei, Ngaina Ngaina and Eegi Khongul. All these films were produced by Rakesh Naorem, with whom Meira developed a successful collaboration.

Year	Title	Studio (Production House)
2012	Sakhenbi Iteima	Ipak Films
2013	Phongdoknadringei	Ipak Films
2013	Ngaina Ngaina	Ipak Films
2014	Leiyisigee Wangmada	Ipak Films
2014	Eegi Khongul	Ipak Films
2020	Bangladeshki Sana Tampha	Ipak Films
2020	Aronba Wari	Seuti Films
2022	Haidrasu Khangle	Nongin Film
2023	Ashengba Eral	Dosuyali Film
2024	Khomlang Laman	World Expression
2025	Khoidouwa	World Expression

=== Notable works and events ===
- Poppy Leirang (2023) – A music video directed by OC Meira, achieved the Best Lyrics Award at the 15th Manipur State Film Awards (MSFA) 2023.
- Khomlang Laman (2024) – A feature film directed by Meira, screened at Manipur University during the World Teachers' Day celebration organized by the Manipur University Students' Union.
- Ashengba Eral (2025) – Directed by Meira and written by Kshetrimayum Subadani, under Dosuyali Film Production. The film won several awards at the 6th Roshani International Film Festival 2025. It won the Best Film award at PRAG Cine Awards Northeast 2023.
- Bangladeshki Sana Tampha (2025) – The film, directed by OC Meira, at the 5th Reels International Film Festival 2025, received Best Feature Film and Best Story awards.

== Awards ==
- On 3 December 2017, OC Meira was honored with the Mombi Award by the Manipuri Theatre Centre, Assam, in recognition of his contributions to society through his influential artistic works.
- On 10 December 2017, in a cultural ceremony, Oinamcha Meira was awarded the title Chingkhei Lammit Meira by the Ima Leisem Inat Yokhat Lup. The organizers stated that he was selected for his unbiased and critical writings.
- OC Meira received the Jury Special Mention Award at the NIRI 9 – 2nd International Film Festival 2023, held at Sangeet Kala Mandir, Kolkata.
- Best Lyricist ("Ngamnaba Lanfamse"), at the 12th Manipuri Film Awards (MANIFA) 2025, organized by Thouna Manipur and Film Forum Manipur, held at Central Public Hall, Kakching Sanggai Lampak, Kakching district.

== Legacy and influence ==
From childhood, OC Meira remained connected with theatre and film. His artistic journey was inspired by Shumang Leela groups, MDU, and Rupmahal Theatre artists. By observing their performances, he learned acting techniques indirectly and participated in various drama groups.

His role as Jan Neta Irabot in a street play received wide applause. Through continuous work in theatre and film, Meira became one of the known filmmakers of Manipur.

== See also ==
- Oinam family
