= Aronba Wari =

- Theatrical release poster
- Directed by: OC Meira
- Screenplay by: Manaobi MM
- Story by: Sarungbam Binodini Devi
- Produced by: Rajkumari Nalini Devi
- Starring: Silheiba Ningthoujam; Suraj Ngashepam; Bala Hijam; Sushmita Mangsatabam
- Cinematography: Sanjit XL
- Edited by: Sanjit XL
- Music by: Nanao Sagolmang
- Production company: Seuti Films
- Distributed by: Seuti Films
- Release date: 11 October 2020
- Running time: 138 minutes
- Country: India
- Language: Meiteilon (Manipuri)

Aronba Wari (English: Secret Story) is a 2020 Manipuri film directed by OC Meira and produced by Rajkumari Nalini Devi, under the banner of Seuti Films. It stars Silheiba Ningthoujam, Suraj Ngashepam, Bala Hijam and Sushmita Mangsatabam in the lead roles. The movie is based on Sarungbam Binodini Devi's novel Minoktugi Marumda. It was initially slated to be released on 21 March 2020 but postponed due to the COVID-19 pandemic. The film was premiered on 11 October 2020 at Manipur State Film Development Society (MSFDS), Imphal.

Aronba Wari had its regular theatrical run at Friends Talkies, Paona Bazar in March 2021. It was also screened at the Sangai Film Festival 2022, which was organised as a part of the Manipur Sangai Festival.

== Cast ==
- Silheiba Ningthoujam as Henthoi
- Suraj Ngashepam as Lamnganba, Doctor
- Bala Hijam as Mainoubi
- Sushmita Mangsatabam as Yaiphabi
- Denny Likmabam as Henthoi's father
- Maya Choudhury as Yaiphabi's mother
- Bala Tensubam as Thoibi
- Idhou as Lamnganba's father
- Thongam Thoithoi as Lamnganba's mother
- Tej Kshetri as Tunan
- Laimayum Gaitri as Thoibi's mother
- Moirangthem Sunil Myboy as Joseph
- Irom Shyamkishore as Thoibi's father
- Roji Brahmacharimayum as Khullakpa's wife
- Lilabati Chanam as Maipakpi, Mainoubi's mother
- Surjit Saikhom as Ibomcha
- Jugindro Oinam
- Khoirom Loya as Khullakpa
- Suhela Paonam as Teacher
- Master Sandip
- Master Mukunda

== Soundtrack ==
Nanao Sagolmang composed the songs for the movie and Manaobi MM wrote the lyrics. The film has four songs and the video song copyrights for YouTube release were procured by Mami Taibang.

No.	Title	Lyrics	Music	Singer(s)	Length
1.	"Kaiba Yaadaba Laigi Lam"	Manaobi MM	Nanao Sagolmang	Iraileima	3:10
2.	"Nungshiba Nungshiba"	Manaobi MM	Nanao Sagolmang	Sushmita Mangsatabam	4:23
3.	"Eigee Thammoigee Nungshiba"	Manaobi MM	Nanao Sagolmang	R.K. Nalini	3:30
4.	"Matam Kuina"	Manaobi MM	Nanao Sagolmang	Arbin Soibam	4:30
Total length:					15:33

== Accolades ==
The film won three awards at the 14th Manipur State Film Awards 2022.

Award	Category	Winner's name	Result
14th Manipur State Film Awards 2022	Best Music Direction (Song)	Nanao Sagolmang	Won
14th Manipur State Film Awards 2022	Best Male Playback Singer	Arbin Soibam for the song "Matam Kuina"	Won
14th Manipur State Film Awards 2022	Best Female Playback Singer	R.K. Nalini Devi for the song "Eigee Thammoigee Nungshiba"	Won

== See also ==
- List of Meitei-language films
