= Moreh Maru =

- Theatrical release poster
- Directed by: Oinam Gautam Singh
- Screenplay by: Laishram Santosh
- Story by: Laishram Santosh
- Produced by: Ph. Thoithoi & Laishram Santosh
- Starring: Gurumayum Bonny; Bala Hijam; Mukabala (Loya) Maibam; Roshan Pheiroijam
- Cinematography: Mohon Kangla
- Edited by: Sandeep; Somorjit Haobam (Vfx); Yograj Yumnam (Vfx); Eastern Digital (Vfx)
- Music by: Sorri Senjam; Khelen
- Production company: RT Motion Pictures
- Distributed by: RT Motion Pictures
- Release dates: 26 October 2016 (MSFDS); 27 October 2016 (BOAT)
- Running time: 139 minutes
- Country: India
- Language: Meiteilon (Manipuri)

Moreh Maru (English: Moreh Tablet) is a 2016 Manipuri comedy film directed by O. Gautam and written by Laishram Santosh. It stars Gurumayum Bonny, Bala Hijam, Mukabala (Loya) Maibam and Roshan Pheiroijam in the lead roles. Moreh Maru was premiered at MSFDS on 26 October 2016, and released on 27 October 2016 at Bhagyachandra Open Air Theatre (BOAT), Palace Compound, Imphal. The film was also screened at Shankar Lal Auditorium, Delhi University, New Delhi, on 6 November 2016. This film is a sequel to the 2013 hit Manipuri film Beragee Bomb. The film was screened at Usha Cinema, Paona Bazar from 31 December 2016, but the film didn't run long in the theatre due to piracy issues. The DVDs of the film were released on 13 January 2017.

== Plot ==
The story revolves around a drug dealer (Bonny) who is facing post accidental bomb blast injury crisis and the revenge he wants to take to his enemy, related to the bomb blast. Two broken hearted fellow (Mukabala & Roshan) falls to the trap of Bonny on the day of eloping Manipuri film star Bala. Mukabala happens to take drug that is indirectly supplied by Bonny due to some challenges with his peer member. His drugs' chemical reaction leads to fantasizing about different super heroes and Bala, the film star. He is also blinded with the situation happening around and stealing of sub inspector's (Prem Sharma) gun during frisking. Prem Sharma faces a major challenge of losing his gun and suspension from his job. He starts his journey to find Mukabala. On the other side, Roshan is nowhere to be found after the night of eloping with Bala. Bala and Mukabala drive out to find Roshan. Mukabala, haunted by his memory and the problems he has created during that previous night, aimlessly starts walking to find Roshan. The story is intermingled with the given above characters and their hope to solve their problems.

== Cast ==
- Gurumayum Bonny as Manibabu
- Bala Hijam as Bala
- Roshan Pheiroijam
- Mukabala (Loya) Maibam
- Prasanta Oinam
- Prem Sharma
- Tayenjam Mema
- Idhou
- Govin
- G.S. Nanao
- Ibomcha

== Soundtrack ==
Sorri Senjam & Khelen composed the soundtrack for the film and Romi Meitei and Homen D' Wai wrote the lyrics. The songs are titled Moreh Maru and Oh Bala Oh Bala.

Moreh Maru

Soundtrack album by Sorri Senjam, Boy Malang, Gems Chongtham, Surma Chanu
- Genre: Feature film soundtrack
- Length: 10:05
- Label: RT Motion Pictures

No.	Title	Lyrics	Music	Singer(s)	Length
1.	"Moreh Maru"	Romi Meitei	Sorri Senjam	Sorri Senjam & Boy Malang	04:54
2.	"Oh Bala Oh Bala"	Homen D' Wai	Khelen	Gems Chongtham & Surma Chanu	05:11
Total length:					10:05

== Accolades ==
Award	Category	Winner's name	Result
6th SSS MANIFA 2017	Best Make-Up	Russia	Won

== Promotions ==
Moreh Maru was promoted in the Saturday night special edition of Manung Hutna of Impact TV on 22 October 2016, hosted by Raj Nongthombam. Besides this, T-shirts with prints of Moreh Maru posters were also made available to the public prior to the premiere of the movie as a part of the promotion.
