= Aliyah (2018 film) =

- Theatrical release poster
- Directed by: Yoimayai Mongsaba
- Written by: Binoranjan Oinam
- Produced by: Reshi Thokchom
- Starring: Gurumayum Bonny; Artina Thoudam
- Cinematography: Mohon Kangla; Song Videography: Ibomcha Irom
- Edited by: Yoimayai Mongsaba
- Music by: Tony Aheibam; Jeetenkumar Naorem
- Production company: Evening Star Films
- Distributed by: D.I.S. Construction Material Pvt. Limited
- Release date: 19 August 2018
- Country: India
- Language: Meiteilon (Manipuri)

Aliyah (Meitei: ꯑꯂꯤꯌꯥꯍ) is a 2018 Indian Manipuri film directed by Yoimayai Mongsaba, written by Binoranjan Oinam and produced by Reshi Thokchom. The film features Artina Thoudam in the title role and Gurumayum Bonny in the lead roles. The film was released on 19 August 2018 at MSFDS (Manipur State Film Development Society), Palace Compound, Imphal.

== Plot ==
It is a romantic film about a Hindu guy Leishabi and a Muslim lady Aliyah, where religion happens to be the main reason for their relationship to fall apart.

== Cast ==
- Artina Thoudam as Aliyah
- Gurumayum Bonny as Leishabi
- Idhou as Hanif's Father
- Surjit Saikhom as Hanif
- Tayenjam Mema as Leishabi's Mother
- Sagolsem Dhanamanjuri as Aliyah's Mother
- Billa Ngathem as Nafisa, Aliyah's friend
- Sanatomba Sharma as Aliyah's Uncle-in-law
- Ningthouja Jayvidya as Moneylender
- Laishram Lalitabi

== Accolades ==
Aliyah won Best Actor in a Leading Role - Female and Best Story awards at the 8th Sahitya Seva Samiti Awards (SSS MANIFA) 2019, with several nominations in different categories. It won the Best Editor Award at the 12th Manipur State Film Awards 2019.

Award	Category	Winner's name	Result
8th SSS MANIFA 2019	Best Actor in a Leading Role - Female	Artina Thoudam	Won
8th SSS MANIFA 2019	Best Story	Binoranjan Oinam	Won
8th SSS MANIFA 2019	Best Actor in a Supporting Role - Female	Sagolsem Dhanamanjuri	Nominated
8th SSS MANIFA 2019	Best Costume	Galif Pa	Nominated
8th SSS MANIFA 2019	Best Make-Up	Sanathoi Waheng	Nominated
8th SSS MANIFA 2019	Best Screenplay	Binoranjan Oinam	Nominated
12th Manipur State Film Awards 2019	Best Editor	Yoimayai Mongsaba	Won
12th Manipur State Film Awards 2019	Best Costume	Galif Pa	Won
12th Manipur State Film Awards 2019	Special Jury Mention	Chakpram Rameshchandra (Idhou)	Won

== Soundtrack ==
Tony Aheibam and Jeetenkumar Naorem composed the soundtrack for the film and Binoranjan Oinam wrote the lyrics. The songs are titled Marou Leibi and Leihoure. The song Marou Leibi was initially composed by Tony Aheibam, but was re-composed by Jeetenkumar Naorem due to the ban by Film Forum Manipur with the claim that the tune is similar to classical song tunes of other language.

No.	Title	Lyrics	Music	Singer(s)	Length
1.	"Marou Leibi"	Binoranjan Oinam	Jeetenkumar Naorem	Rahul Sharma, Pushparani Huidrom, Dipu Khunung	5:01
2.	"Leihoure"	Binoranjan Oinam	Tony Aheibam	Arbin Soibam	5:47
Total length:					10:48

== See also ==
- Akangba Nachom
- List of Meitei-language films
