= Binoranjan Oinam =

Indian writer and filmmaker from Manipur

- Born: Binoranjan Oinam; Imphal, Manipur, India
- Occupations: Writer, Lyricist, Filmmaker

Binoranjan Oinam (ꯕꯤꯅꯣꯔꯟꯖꯟ ꯑꯣꯏꯅꯥꯝ) is an Indian writer, lyricist and filmmaker from Manipur. He is known for his writings in Manipuri films, like Tomthin Shija, Aliyah, Akangba Nachom and Langdai Ama.

== Career ==
Binoranjan Oinam has scripted films like Eikhoi Pabunggi, Tomthin Shija, Aliyah, Ichadi Manini and Akangba Nachom. He has also written screenplays for feature films Khudi and Rongdaife. In 2024, he debuted as a filmmaker with the feature film Langdai Ama, which was also scripted by him. It was screened at the 9th Brahmaputra Valley Film Festival and 17th Habitat Film Festival 2025.

== Accolades ==
Oinam was honoured with different titles at film awards and festivals.

| Award | Category | Film | Result | Ref. |
|---|---|---|---|---|
| 9th Brahmaputra Valley Film Festival 2024 | Best Director | Langdai Ama | Won | |
| 2nd North East India Film Festival, Manipur | Best Screenplay | Langdai Ama | Won | |
| 11th MANIFA 2023 | Best Screenplay | Akangba Nachom | Won | |

== Filmography ==
| Year | Film | Role |
|---|---|---|
| 2016 | Eikhoi Pabunggi | Story, screenplay, lyricist |
| 2017 | Tomthin Shija | Story, screenplay, lyricist |
| 2017 | Speedbreaker | Story, screenplay |
| 2018 | Aliyah | Story, screenplay, lyricist |
| 2019 | Ichadi Manini | Story, screenplay, lyricist |
| 2021 | Khudi | Screenplay |
| 2021 | Rongdaife | Screenplay |
| 2022 | Akangba Nachom | Story, screenplay, lyricist |
| 2022 | Nongallamdaisida | Screenplay |
| 2024 | Langdai Ama | Story, screenplay, director |
| Upcoming | Aroiba Wayel | Story, screenplay, director |
| Upcoming | Etinpham | Story, screenplay, director |
| Upcoming | Ashithong Achangthong | Story, screenplay, lyricist |
| Upcoming | Yaisa Returns | Story, screenplay, director |

== See also ==
- Oinam family
