= Chana Lukhoi =

Indian playwright, folk narrator and cultural activist

Oinam Lukhoi (ꯑꯣꯏꯅꯥꯝ ꯂꯨꯈꯣꯏ), also known as Oinamcha Tunan, popularly known as Chana Lukhoi (ꯆꯅꯥ ꯂꯨꯈꯣꯏ, 10 April 1950 – 29 December 2024), was an Indian playwright, folk narrator, and cultural activist from Manipur. He was a leading figure in Shumang Leela, a traditional Manipuri courtyard theatre form. Over his long career, he wrote more than 200 plays and received many awards for his contribution to Meitei art, literature, and culture.

== Early life and education ==
Chana Lukhoi was born on 10 April 1950 in Oinam Tunan, a locality in Imphal East district, Manipur. He was the son of Oinam Mani and Irungbam Ningol Amu Leima. His grandfather, Oinam Sanghai, was also known for narrating Meitei folktales. Lukhoi studied at Lamlai High School in Pungdongbam, where he was popular for his public speaking and leadership skills. During his school years, he was elected as the general secretary of the school and was admired for his oratory.

He began learning traditional Meitei storytelling under Ch. Hera, and later studied Meitei folk traditions from Pandit Kh. Deva Singh of Thongjao, P. Mohan of Yairipok Poirou Khongjil, and Madhov Pandit of Toubungkhok. By the age of twelve, he had already become known as a folk narrator and began performing traditional Meitei stories (Puya Wari) across Manipur, Assam, Tripura, and even in Bangladesh.

Chana Lukhoi married Kaidem Ningol Lembi (Nungthilchaibi). They had two sons and two daughters. From a previous marriage, he had three sons—Okensana (Punshi), Lamjing, and OC Meira—and two daughters, Mangalleima and Linthoinganbi. He also had a stepdaughter named Langlen from his second marriage to Kala, daughter of Kantajit.

He lived with his family at Chana Mayai Leikai, Imphal East district. Outside his writing, his hobbies included reading, gardening, and spending time with children in his neighborhood.

== Career ==
=== Beginnings as folk narrator ===
Lukhoi started as a folk tale narrator in the Wari Leeba tradition, which draws from epics like the Mahabharata and Ramayana in the Vaishnav religion. His storytelling talent brought him wide recognition across Manipuri-speaking regions.

In 2003, he received the Anji Cultural Award from Anji Cultural Academy, Imphal, and the Khumanthem Kaomacha Memorial Gold Medal from the Manipuri Sahitya Parishad for his contributions to Meitei folk culture.

=== Playwriting and Shumang Leela ===
From around 1980, Chana Lukhoi began writing scripts for Shumang Leela and stage plays. His first play, Eegi Nong, was controversial and was once banned by the Government of Manipur for allegedly promoting armed movements. He was briefly imprisoned, during which he wrote another play titled Nongankhidraba Ahing.

Over the years, Lukhoi became one of the most respected Shumang Leela playwrights. His works often focused on social issues, Manipuri traditions, and human emotions. His major plays include:

- Sana-patki Thariktha
- Chaina-pung
- Hingnabagi Dabi
- Leishabigi Machado
- Eegi Nong
- Keishamthong Thoibi
- Love 2000
- Shabi Shanou Express
- Nongankhidraba Ahing
- Kangleipakta 1709

In total, he wrote more than 200 plays, many of which were staged across Manipur. His scripts won 18 Best Script Awards and 9 Second Best Script Awards from the Manipur State Kala Academy and the Manipur State Shumang Leela Council (MSSLC).

Lukhoi also wrote for All India Radio (AIR) Imphal and Doordarshan Kendra (DDK) Imphal, producing several radio plays and serials. He contributed scripts for government departments such as family welfare, science and technology, and MACS.

== Literary contributions ==
Apart from playwriting, Lukhoi wrote for newspapers and magazines. He was a regular columnist in the Meitei language edition of The Sangai Express, under the column Chentharakliba Eechel, which appeared every Friday. His essays and prose focused on Meitei culture, moral values, and literature.

His literary works include:

- Charei Huimadon Leima (Drama)
- Eegi Nong (Shumang Leela)
- Sanapatki Thariktha (Shumang Leela)
- Changing Lairembi (Laichatlon)
- Hotel Boy (Radio Play)
- Nupi Landa Thouna Phabising (Essay)
- Shaknaiba 12 (Biography)

He also wrote film scripts for Meitei movies such as Keishamthong Thoibi, Sekmai Turel, Bora Uchi, Pacha, and Nungshibi.

== Awards and recognition ==
Chana Lukhoi received numerous awards for his contributions to Meitei art and culture. Among them are:

- IACAM Award (2006): Presented by the Indigenous Art and Culture Association, Manipur, in memory of Shijagurumayum Nilbir Sharma Shastri. He was the first recipient.
- Nongthombam Birendrajit Award (Manipur State Shumang Leela Council)
- Iboyaima Shumang Leela Award
- Peeba Chingmi Tammi Nungshi Khudol Award (Meetei National Front, Kangleipak)
- IKAM Award (Manipuri Development Trust, Bangladesh)
- Khumanthem Kaomacha Ningshing Sanagi Takaman (Manipuri Sahitya Parishad)
- Anji Cultural Award (2003)
- Thokchom Iboyaima Award (2023): Given by the Manipur State Shumang Leela Council, with a cash prize of ₹50,000, citation, and shawl.
- Dr. Thiyam Suresh Literary Award (2023): Conferred by the Patriotic Writers’ Forum (PAWF), Manipur, in recognition of his literary work.

He also received numerous state honors and recognition for his role in promoting Manipuri theatre.

== Affiliations and teaching ==
Lukhoi was a member of the Kangla Religious Committee, Kangla Fort Board, and the Academic Council of Manipur University of Culture (MUC). He served as a Visiting Guru in the Dance Department of the university, mentoring many young artists.

He participated in cultural exchange programs in Bangladesh and Myanmar, where he promoted Meitei traditions and the art of Shumang Leela.

== Later activities ==
In May 2022, he participated in the Manipuri Cultural Festival 2022, held at Chana Pukhri Mapal, Imphal East. The event was organized by the Chana Lukhoi Art Centre (CLAC) and the Patriotic Writers’ Forum (PAWF). During the event, Lukhoi emphasized the importance of safeguarding traditional art forms for future generations.

== Death ==
Chana Lukhoi passed away on 29 December 2024 at his residence in Chana village, Imphal East, after a long illness. He was 74 years old.

His death was widely mourned in Manipur. Tributes were offered by organizations such as the Communist Party of India (Manipur State Council), Uttra Shanglen Sana Konung, Manipur Students’ Federation (MSF), Manipuri Sahitya Parishad, Sanamahi Laining Inat Chaokhat Lup (SALAI-LUP), and International Salai Punsikol (ISP). Memorial meetings were held across the state, including at Cheingak-Cheisu and Manipur Sahitya Parishad, Imphal, where members observed moments of silence in his honor.

== See also ==
- Oinam family
