= I Rise (film) =

2020 Indian documentary short film

- Poster
- Directed by: Borun Thokchom
- Based on: Laishram Sarita Devi
- Produced by: Films Division of India
- Release date: 2020
- Running time: 52 minutes
- Country: India
- Language: Meiteilon (Manipuri)

I Rise is a 52-minute Indian documentary short film inspired by the real-life saga of a seven-time Asian Championship medalist Laishram Sarita Devi. The film is directed and cinematographed by Borun Thokchom and produced by Films Division of India.

The film was selected to be screened at the 9th Mumbai Short International Film Festival and chosen from a list of 19 documentaries. The film was awarded the Best Documentary At Mumbai Short International Film Festival in October 2020. It also won the Best Film on Women Outstanding Achievement Award at the Tagore International Film Festival which was held in West Bengal.

== People featured ==
The film is based on the real story of Laishram Sarita Devi who was born to a poor family in the district of Manipur. She gained prominence after winning a bronze medal at the World Championship held in 2005. She was also bestowed upon with the Arjuna award for her achievements.

The film starts from the 2014 Asian Games which was held in Incheon, South Korea where Sarita Devi won the third place in the championship but refused to accept her bronze medal in protest after a controversial loss to host Korea's Park Ji-Na. AIBA later suspended her from Manipur for the disrespectful act. She also got banned for one year.

== Production ==
The film is set in Thoubal. The shooting of I Rise commenced in 2015 and continued for five years. The film was completed in December 2019.
