= Lembi Leima =

- Directed by: Mayank Pratap Singh
- Written by: Mayank Pratap Singh; Nicky Chandam
- Produced by: RJ; Bijou Thaangjam
- Starring: Bala Hijam; Bijou Thaangjam; Naveen Jagbir Sandhu; Khonykar Khuraijam
- Cinematography: Ravi B Ranjan Sharma
- Edited by: Protim Khound
- Music by: Sound Designer: Surmani Rishi
- Production company: Cicada Film Production
- Distributed by: Rj Star Production; Hei Lei Creation
- Release date: December 2022 (Northeast India IFF)
- Running time: 44 minutes
- Country: India
- Language: Meiteilon (Manipuri)

Lembi Leima (English: The Goddess Of Forest) is a 2022 Indian Manipuri short film directed by Mayank Pratap Singh. It is produced by Rj Star Production and Bijou Thaangjam under the banner of Cicada Film Production. The film got official selection at the Rajnigandha Jagran Film Festival 2023. It was the opening as well as the closing film at the 1st Northeast Film Festival 2023, Mumbai.

Lembi Leima got official selections at the Indian Film Festival of Melbourne 2023 (Beyond Bollywood Competition Section); 19th Annual South Asian International Film Festival of New York 2022.

== Cast ==
- Bala Hijam as Surjabala, National Mission on Edible Oil-Palm Oil (NMEO) Consultant
- Bijou Thaangjam as Nando, Surjabala's caretaker
- Naveen Jagbir Sandhu as Jagbir Singh
- Khonykar Khuraijam as Taibungo
- Niranjoy Luwangcha as Tomba
- Hajarimayum Roji as Nanao's mother
- Brahmacharimayum Dishiraj as Nanao
- Tomthin Thokchom as Chaoba
- R.K. Achangba as Guest House Boy
- Thangjam Aruna Devi
- Thangjam Ashalata Devi
- Azhar Khan
- Zeedan Ahmed Kori
- Shyam Lourembam as Villager
- Thangjam Luxmi
- Thangjam Memma
- Ajit Moirangthem as Guest House Boy
- Ngangbam Tonthoi Singh as Villager

== Accolades ==
Award	Category	Winner's name	Result	Ref.
4th Empty Space International Short Film Festival 2024	Best Actress	Bala Hijam Ningthoujam	Won	
1st Northeast Film Festival, Mumbai 2023	Best Film (Gold)	Producers: RJ & Bijou Thaangjam; Director:Mayank Pratap Singh	Won	
Eastern Europe Independent Movie Award 2023, Turkiye	Best Make-Up	Rejoice Singh & Simi Phanjoubam	Won	
Golden Giraffe International Film Festival 2023, Italy	Best Make-Up	Rejoice Singh & Simi Phanjoubam	Won	
16 International Film Festivals 2023, Jaipur	Top 5 Best Short Fiction Film	Mayank Pratap Singh	Won	
Golden Fern Films Award 2023	Best Narrative Film	Producers: RJ & Bijou Thaangjam; Director:Mayank Pratap Singh	Won	
Golden Fern Films Award 2023	Best Actress	Bala Hijam Ningthoujam	Won	
Golden Fern Films Award 2023	Best Supporting Actor	Bijou Thaangjam	Won	
Golden Fern Films Award 2023	Best Cinematography	Ravi B Ranjan Sharma	Won	
Thilsri International Film Festival 2023, Chennai	Best Asian Short Film	Producers: RJ & Bijou Thaangjam; Director:Mayank Pratap Singh	Won	
Thilsri International Film Festival 2023, Chennai	Best Actress	Bala Hijam Ningthoujam	Won	
Thilsri International Film Festival 2023, Chennai	Best Supporting Actor	Bijou Thaangjam	Won	
Thilsri International Film Festival 2023, Chennai	Best Cinematography	Ravi B Ranjan Sharma	Won	
Sitannavasal International Film Festival 2022	Best Indian Short Film	Producers: RJ & Bijou Thangjam; Director:Mayank Pratap Singh	Won	
Sitannavasal International Film Festival 2022	Best Actress	Bala Hijam Ningthoujam	Won	
Sitannavasal International Film Festival 2022	Best Supporting Actor	Bijou Thangjam	Won	
1st Northeast India International Film Festival 2022, Dimapur	Best Regional Film	Producers: RJ & Bijou Thangjam; Director:Mayank Pratap Singh	Won	
1st Northeast India International Film Festival 2022, Dimapur	Best Actress	Bala Hijam Ningthoujam	Won	
1st Northeast India International Film Festival 2022, Dimapur	Best Supporting Actor	Bijou Thangjam	Won	
