= Bala Hijam =

Indian actress (born 1992)

- Born: Hijam Surjabala Devi; Sagolband Salam Leikai, Imphal
- Occupation: Actress
- Height: 162 cm (5 ft 4 in)
- Spouse: Ningthoujam Dinesh Singh
- Parent(s): Hijam Biramangol; Hijam Suniti Devi

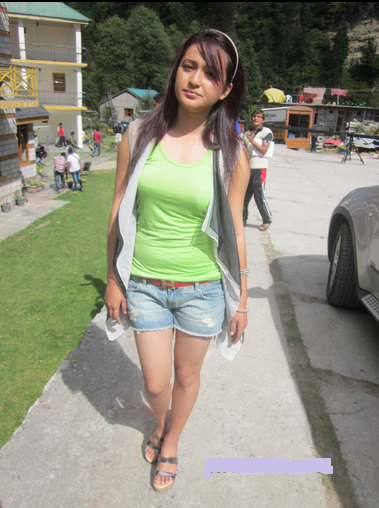
Bala Hijam

Surja Bala Hijam (born 9 Jun 1991; at Imphal), better known as Bala Hijam (Meitei pronunciation: /ba-lā hī-jam/), is an Indian actress, who predominantly appears in Manipuri films. She is known for her roles in Boong, Neelakasham Pachakadal Chuvanna Bhoomi, Yaiskulgee Pakhang Angaoba, Manipur Express, Sanagi Tangbal, Amukta Ani and Inamma.

== Career ==
Bala Hijam made her debut at the age of 15 in Oken Amakcham's Tellangga Mamei, through the reference of the cinematographer of the movie Irom Maipak. She started shooting for her Hindi film debut Zindagi on the Rocks, but was left incomplete due to some issues. Her notable role after her first film was in Romi Meitei's Khangdreda Nongdamba, where she played a supporting role alongside Kamala Saikhom. Panthungee Wangmada, directed by Yoimayai Mongsaba and produced under the banner Fly High Films was her first film in a leading role. Among her popular films, Yaiskulgee Pakhang Angaoba, Manipur Express, Meerang Mahum, Amukta Ani, Delhi Mellei, Sanagi Tangbal and Thabaton 2 may be mentioned. She played the role of a disabled lady in the movie Tamoyaigee Ebecha.

In 2018, she appeared in an educational film Who Said Boys Can't Wear Makeup?. She also featured in the short film Lembi Leima directed by Mayank Pratap Singh in 2022. In 2024, she played the role of Mandakini in Boong, an internationally acclaimed film that had its world premiere at the 2024 Toronto International Film Festival.

== Accolades ==
Bala Hijam was honoured with different titles at several film awards and festivals.

Award	Category	Film	Ref.
5th RJ Film Vision Special Award 2011	Special Jury Award	–	
8th Manipur State Film Festival 2013	Best Actress	Yaiskulgee Pakhang Angaoba	
11th Manipur State Film Awards 2018	Best Actor in a Supporting Role - Female	Chinglen Sana	
9th MANIFA 2020	Best Actor in a Leading Role - Female	Inamma	
1st Northeast India International Film Festival 2022, Dimapur	Best Actress	Lembi Leima	
Sitannavasal International Film Festival 2022	Best Actress	Lembi Leima	
Thilsri International Film Festival 2023, Chennai	Best Actress	Lembi Leima	
Golden Fern Films Award 2023	Best Actress	Lembi Leima	
4th Empty Space International Short Film Festival 2024	Best Actress	Lembi Leima	

== Selected filmography ==
- All films are in Meitei unless otherwise noted.

Year	Title	Role(s)	Director(s)	Notes	Ref.
2006	Tellangga Mamei	Bembem	Oken Amakcham	Child Artist, Debut film	
2009	Khangdreda Nongdamba	Bala	Romi Meitei		
2009	Panthungee Wangmada	Linthoi	Yoimayai Mongsaba		
2010	Imagi Laman Singamdre	Niti	Romi Meitei		
2010	Kadarmapee	Nungthil Chaibi	L. Prakash		
2010	21st Century's Kunti	Kethabi	Joy Soram		
2011	Hanggam Maru Pokkhaibi	Mitlaobi	L. Surjakanta		
2011	Loibataare Ta Raju	Molly	Pilu H.		
2011	Nongmadi Soidana	Leina	Ishomani		
2011	Luhongbagi Ahing	Purnima	Bijgupta Laishram		
2011	Yaiskulgee Pakhang Angaoba	Majaru	Homen D' Wai	Won Best Actress	
2012	Taru Tarubi Maktabee	Maktabee	Tej Kshetri		
2012	Thouri	Mallu	Khoibam Homeshwori		
2012	Nongdambada Tanoubi	Sanathoi	Rajen Leishangthem		
2012	Mami	Lily	Jeetendra Ningomba		
2012	Lamjasara	Fajarei	L. Prakash		
2012	Manipur Express	Tampha	O. Gautam		
2012	Lamkhai	Thadoi	Ningthoukhongjam Medhajeet		
2013	Neelakasham Pachakadal Chuvanna Bhoomi	Assi	Sameer Thahir	Malayalam Debut	
2013	Mounao Thoibi	Thoibi	Romi Meitei		
2013	Thajagee Maihing	Thaja	Romi Meitei		
2013	Chow Chow Momo na haobara Shingju Bora na oinambara	Nungshitombi	RK Jiten		
2013	Tamoyaigee Ebecha	Ebecha	Pilu H.		
2014	Sathiba Danger	Sakhenbi	Ajit Ningthouja		
2014	Sanagi Tangbal	Lingjelthoibi	Bijgupta Laishram		
2014	Meerang Mahum	Nganthoi	Ajit Ningthouja		
2014	23rd Century: Ngasigee Matungda	Thambal	Dinesh Tongbram		
2014	Hoo Chaage	Leishilembi	Denny Likmabam		
2014	Amukta Ani	Thoibi	Romi Meitei		
2014	Thabaton 2	Nungsithoi	Bijgupta Laishram		
2014	Delhi Mellei	Mellei	Ajit Ningthouja		
2015	Toro	Thoibi	Kirmil Soraisam		
2015	Da Lem	Sorinchon	Hemanta Khuman		
2015	Nungshit Mapi	Thambal	Ajit Ningthouja		
2015	Cheikhei	Sanatombi	Premkumar Paonam		
2015	Angangba Mayek (Pizza 2)	Thanil	Dinesh Tongbram		
2015	Eikhoi Pabunggi	Engellei	Hemanta Khuman		
2015	Kum Kang Kum Kabi Chang	Tharo	Bishwamittra		
2016	Moreh Maru	Bala	O. Gautam		
2016	Tharo Thambal	Tharo	Bijgupta Laishram		
2016	Khongfam	Tampha	Sudhir Kangjam		
2016	Sor	Usha	Ajit Ningthouja		
2017	Iche Tampha	Thadoi	Bijgupta Laishram		
2017	Mitlu	Thaarlin	Gyaneshwor Konj		
2017	Mani Mamou	Ningthibee	Ajit Ningthouja		
2017	Mr. Khadang	Thadoi	Chou En Lai		
2017	Chinglen Sana	Langlen	Bijgupta Laishram	Best Actor - Supporting Role	
2017	Kaongamdraba Facebook	Tampha	AK. Gyaneshori		
2018	Sanagi Nga	Thaja	Romi Meitei		
2018	Who Said Boys Can't Wear Makeup?	Herself	Priyakanta Laishram		
2018	Ebungee Echal	Leibaklei	Hemanta Khuman		
2018	Nungshibana Loire	Sana	Sadananda Salam		
2018	Chanu IPS	Laija	Sanaton Nongthomba		
2018	Yotpi	Yoihenbi	Romi Meitei		
2018	Pari Imom	Sanatombi	Bijgupta Laishram		
2018	Hidak Tombi	Tombi	Chou En Lai		
2019	Kao Phaaba	Matouleibi	Ishomani		
2019	Ichadi Manini	Yaiphabi	Geet Yumnam		
2019	Inamma	Memtombi	Homeshwori	Won Best Actress at 9th MANIFA 2020	
2019	Namase Chaphu Huranbini	Memsana	Herojit Naoroibam		
2019	Wakchingi Len	Yaiphabi	Bijgupta Laishram		
2019	Mutlamdai Thaomei	Thaballei	Sudhir Kangjam		
2019	Thabaton 3	Nungsithoi	Bijgupta Laishram		
2019	Chanu IPS 2	Laija	Sanaton Nongthomba		
2019	Mamal Naidraba Thamoi	Nurei	Gyanand		
2019	Eerei	Eethak	Krishnakumar Gurumayum		
2020	Aronba Wari	Mainoubi	OC Meira		
2020	15 August: A Love Story		Krishnand Ningombam		
2022	Shamjabee	Nungsitombi	Premkumar Paonam		
2022	Ningol	Tarubi	L. Surjakanta		
2022	Wangma Wangmada	Actress	Kirmil Soraisam		
2022	Lembi Leima	Surjabala	Mayank Pratap Singh		
2024	Boong	Mandakini	Lakshmipriya Devi		
2024	Laangoi	Henthoi	Manoranjan Longjam		
2025	Nung Onkhraba Thamoi	Thoibi	Surjit Khuman		
Upcoming	Ahingsina Loidringei	Thoibi	O. Gautam		
Upcoming	Leishembi	Leishembi	Rakesh Moirangthem		
Upcoming	Ketukigi Leinam	Memthoibi/Memi	Gyanand Ksh.		
