= Langdai Ama =

2024 Indian film

Langdai Ama: The Juncture
- Directed by: Binoranjan Oinam
- Written by: Binoranjan Oinam
- Produced by: Reshi Thokchom
- Starring: Amarr Mayanglambam; Amarjeet Rajkumar; Leishangthem Tonthoi
- Cinematography: Tarun Wang
- Edited by: Alam Thani
- Music by: Jeeten Kumar Naorem
- Production company: Evening Star Films
- Release date: 7 December 2024; (BVFF)
- Running time: 95 minutes
- Country: India
- Language: Meiteilon (Manipuri)

Langdai Ama (English: The Juncture) is a 2024 Manipuri film written and directed by Binoranjan Oinam. The film is produced by Reshi Thokchom under the banner of Evening Star Films and presented by Artina Thoudam. Amarr Mayanglambam, Amarjeet Rajkumar and Leishangthem Tonthoi star as the leads. The film got official selections at the 9th Brahmaputra Valley Film Festival (BVFF) 2024, 2nd Eikhoigi Imphal International Film Festival and 17th Habitat Film Festival. The movie was screened at the 2nd North East India Film Festival, Manipur 2025 on 12 February 2025 under the competition section. The film was certified "U" by CBFC in 2024.

== Cast ==
- Amarr Mayanglambam as Thoiba Rajkumar, Documentary filmmaker
- Amarjeet Rajkumar as Ibochou Rajkumar, Owner of a construction company
- Leishangthem Tonthoi as Leima, Folk singer
- Elangbam Indu as Leima's mother
- Jayvidya Ningthouja
- Maibi Oinam Dhani

== Reception ==
The Signpost News praised Langdai Ama for its cultural sensitivity, and standout performances by Tonthoi Leishangthem and Rajkumar Amarjeet, calling it an ambitious regional film with visual poise. However, it criticised lead actor Amarr Mayanglambam's performance as over-expressive and noted that the screenplay and abrupt ending diluted the film's emotional depth.

== Accolades ==
Award	Category	Winner's name	Result	Ref.
9th Brahmaputra Valley Film Festival 2024	Best Direction	Binoranjan Oinam	Won	
2nd North East India Film Festival, Manipur	Best Screenplay	Binoranjan Oinam	Won	
17th Manipur State Film Awards 2025	Best Choreographer	Quintan Mayengbam	Won	
17th Manipur State Film Awards 2025	Best VFX Supervisor	Mahendra Ch.	Won	
12th MANIFA 2025	Best Actor in a Leading Role - Male	Amarr Mayanglambam	Nominated	
12th MANIFA 2025	Best Make-Up	Abujam Ragini Devi	Nominated	
12th MANIFA 2025	Best Audiographer	Punil Hiyang	Nominated	
