= VDF Thasana =

- Theatrical release poster
- Directed by: Homen D' Wai
- Written by: Homen D' Wai
- Produced by: L. Momo Sharma
- Starring: Gurumayum Bonny; Leishangthem Tonthoi; Abenao Elangbam
- Cinematography: Mahesh Chhetry
- Edited by: Kalu & Pibaton
- Music by: Gotimayum Surchandra Sharma; Audiography: Romi Lamabam
- Production company: Robin Color Picture
- Distributed by: Color Art
- Release date: 27 March 2014
- Running time: 150 minutes
- Country: India
- Language: Meiteilon (Manipuri)

VDF Thasana is a 2014 Manipuri film written and directed by Homen D' Wai and produced by L. Momo Sharma, under the banner of Robin Color Picture. It stars Gurumayum Bonny as the titular protagonist with Leishangthem Tonthoi and Abenao Elangbam in the lead roles.

VDF Thasana was released at Bhagyachandra Open Air Theatre (BOAT) on 27 March 2014. Due to limited seat capacity of BOAT, the film was premiered again the next day on 28 April 2014 at Shankar Talkies, Lamphel. It was screened in various theatres of Manipur in June 2014.

== Cast ==
- Gurumayum Bonny as Thasana
- Leishangthem Tonthoi as Laishna
- Abenao Elangbam as Thadoi
- Ibomcha as Pharaba, Thasana's friend
- R.K. Sanajaoba as Laishna's father
- Elangbam Indu as Thasana's mother
- Philem Puneshori as Thadoi's mother
- Hijam Shyamdhani as Tomal, Thadoi's grandfather

== Accolades ==
The film bagged five awards at the 9th Manipur State Film Awards 2014.

Award	Category	Winner's name	Result
9th Manipur State Film Awards 2014	Best Audiography	Romi Lamabam	Won
9th Manipur State Film Awards 2014	Best Editing	Hodam Tommy	Won
9th Manipur State Film Awards 2014	Best Lyricist	Homen D' Wai	Won
9th Manipur State Film Awards 2014	Best Female Playback Singer	R.K. Nandeshori	Won
9th Manipur State Film Awards 2014	Best Male Playback Singer	Gurumayum Bonny	Won

== Soundtrack ==
Gotimayum Surchandra Sharma composed the soundtrack for the film and Homen D' Wai wrote the lyrics. The songs are titled Keishampat ni Keishampat and Ha Ha Tomal.

No.	Title	Lyrics	Music	Singer(s)	Length
1.	"Keishampat ni Keishampat"	Homen D' Wai	G. Surchandra	Gurumayum Bonny, Surma Chanu	06:19
2.	"Ha Ha Tomal"	Homen D' Wai	G. Surchandra	Gurumayum Bonny, Nandeshori	05:51
Total length:					12:10
