= Yaiskulgee Pakhang Angaoba =

- Theatrical release poster
- Directed by: Homen D' Wai
- Written by: Homen D' Wai
- Produced by: Premjit Naoroibam; Kenedy Naoroibam
- Starring: Gurumayum Bonny; Bala Hijam
- Cinematography: Mohon Kangla
- Edited by: K. Bimol Sharma
- Music by: Aphao; Surmani (Rishi) Sharma; Audiography: Keithellakpam Khojit
- Production companies: Kangla Films, Manipur
- Distributed by: Kangla Films, Manipur
- Release date: 17 December 2011
- Running time: 139 minutes
- Country: India
- Language: Meitei language (officially called Manipuri language)

Yaiskulgee Pakhang Angaoba (lit. 'Mad Bachelor of Yaiskul') is a 2011 Indian Meitei language film written and directed by Homen D' Wai. It is produced by Premjit Naoroibam and Kenedy Naoroibam, and presented by Anita Naoroibam. It stars Gurumayum Bonny as the titular protagonist with Bala Hijam in the lead roles. The background score of the film was given by Surmani (Rishi).

Yaiskulgee Pakhang Angaoba was released at Bhagyachandra Open Air Theatre (BOAT), Imphal on 17 December 2011 and screened in different theatres of Manipur in February 2012, including Friends Talkies, Paona Bazar. The film garnered wide critical acclaim upon its release and was a 2012 hit film of Manipur. The line Dashanihe, by Taa Kaboklei Inaocha from the film, became a symbol of humour and irony till today.

== Synopsis ==
Sanatombi is a studious, simple man from Yaiskul. When he returns home from his school boarding, he crosses path with Majaru, a Kabui girl. Sanatombi falls for her. Taking help from the local men like Kaboklei Inaocha and Kokphai, he transformed himself into Yo Sanatombi just to impress Majaru.

Majaru takes the opportunity and plays with Sanatombi but the latter is completely blinded by love. When he learns the truth on April Fool's Day, he suffers from severe depression. With his parents' support and love, he is able to completely recover from it. He does not lose heart and begins to resume his focus on studies. When his hard work and dedication bears fruit, he gives the credit to Majaru. She regrets her past actions and ask Sanatombi for forgiveness.

== Cast ==
- Gurumayum Bonny as Sanatombi
- Bala Hijam as Majaru
- R.K. Sanajaoba as R.K. Sanajaoba, Sanatombi's father
- Star Kamei as Kamei, Majaru's Father
- Heisnam Ongbi Indu as R.K. Tharo Shija, Sanatombi's mother
- Ibomcha as Kaboklei Inaocha
- Gandhi Kangla as Kokphai
- Ritu as Majaru's friend
- Nirupama as Majaru's friend

== Accolades ==
Yaiskulgee Pakhang Angaoba won Best Feature Film Award in 8th Manipur State Film Festival 2013 and 12 other awards including Best Actor, Best Actress and Best Director awards.

Award	Category	Winner's name	Result
8th Manipur State Film Festival, 2013	Best Actor in a Leading Role - Female	Bala Hijam	Won
8th Manipur State Film Festival, 2013	Best Actor in a Leading Role - Male	Gurumayum Bonny	Won
8th Manipur State Film Festival, 2013	Best Director	Homen D' Wai	Won
8th Manipur State Film Festival, 2013	Best Feature Film	Director: Homen D' Wai; Producers: Premjit Naoroibam & Kenedy Naoroibam	Won
8th Manipur State Film Festival, 2013	Best Story	Kangla Films Manipur	Won
8th Manipur State Film Festival, 2013	Best Screenplay	Homen D' Wai	Won
8th Manipur State Film Festival, 2013	Best Male Playback Singer	Aphao Yumnam	Won
8th Manipur State Film Festival, 2013	Best Lyricist	Homen D' Wai	Won
8th Manipur State Film Festival, 2013	Best Costume	Galif Pa	Won
8th Manipur State Film Festival, 2013	Best Make-Up	Gyanand	Won
8th Manipur State Film Festival, 2013	Best Editing	K. Bimal Sharma	Won
8th Manipur State Film Festival, 2013	Best Audiography	Keithellakpam Khojit	Won
8th Manipur State Film Festival, 2013	Best Music Director	Surmani (Rishi) & Aphao Yumnam	Won

== Soundtrack ==
Aphao and Surmani (Rishi) Sharma composed the soundtrack for the film and Homen D' Wai wrote the lyrics. The songs are titled Nakhoi Khulgi Thonggaldani and Nungsi Nangbu Keida Leige. They were among the hit song numbers of 2012.

No.	Title	Lyrics	Music	Singer(s)	Length
1.	"Nakhoi Khulgi Thonggaldani"	Homen D' Wai	Aphao	Aphao, Sarita Gazmer	06:31
2.	"Nungsi Nangbu Keida Leige"	Homen D' Wai	Surmani (Rishi) Sharma	Gurumayum Bonny, Sarita Gazmer	04:55
Total length:					11:26
