= Kekoo Lotpee =

- Theatrical release poster
- Directed by: Homen D' Wai
- Screenplay by: Y. Kumarjit
- Story by: Moirangthem Inao
- Produced by: Homen Rajkumar
- Starring: Lairenjam Olen; Kamala Saikhom; Ngangbi
- Cinematography: Mahesh Chhetry
- Edited by: K. Bimal Sharma
- Music by: Gotimayum Surchandra
- Animation by: Roney Wai & Deven
- Production company: Treasure Island
- Distributed by: Treasure Island
- Release date: 2008
- Running time: 163 minutes
- Country: India
- Language: Meiteilon (Manipuri)

Kekoo Lotpee (English: Hide and Seek) is a 2008 Manipuri film directed by Homen D' Wai and produced by Homen Rajkumar, under the banner of Treasure Island. It stars Lairenjam Olen, Kamala Saikhom and Ngangbi in the lead roles. Olen is spotted with a big moustache in the film.

== Plot ==
In the conflict torn state of Manipur, Manglembi's family finds no good ground for a better future as frightening events unfolds one after another. Her brother Lanjenba, a journalist who exercises maximum power of the pen, suffers too but he never loses his heart to stand for truth. The never ending game of hide and seek plays out in the state. But truth prevails and Lanjenba wins.

== Cast ==
- Lairenjam Olen as Lanjenba
- Kamala Saikhom as Lawyer
- Ngangbi as Manglembi
- Thingom Pritam as Sakhen
- Rina Yengkhom as Shanti
- Aruna as Memthoi
- Benu Ayekpam
- Tayenjam Mema as Shopkeeper
- Irom Shyamkishore
- Thokchom Ibomcha as Pump attendant
- Philem Puneshori as Manglembi's local sister
- Rangilal Laishram as Government school teacher

== Soundtrack ==
Gotimayum Surchandra Sharma composed the soundtrack for the movie. B. Jayantakumar Sharma and Homen D' Wai wrote the lyrics. The movie has three songs. Ita Thaomei and Pebet are animated and based on the popular folk tales of Manipur.

Kekoo Lotpee

Soundtrack album by Sarita Gazmer, Joshep Thokchom, Tapan, Priya
- Released: 2008
- Genre: Feature film soundtrack
- Length: 18:00
- Label: Treasure Island
- Producer: Homen Rajkumar

No.	Title	Music	Singer(s)	Length
1.	"Ita Thaomei"	G. Surchandra Sharma	Sarita Gazmer	06:17
2.	"Pebet"	G. Surchandra Sharma	Sarita Gazmer, Joseph Thokchom	06:56
3.	"Malemshe Mamsillakle"	G. Surchandra Sharma	Tapan, Priya	04:47
Total length:				18:00
