= Kum Kang Kum Kabi Chang =

- Theatrical release poster
- Directed by: Bishwamittra
- Screenplay by: Bishwamittra
- Story by: Dr. M. Priyobrata
- Produced by: S. Minakumari
- Starring: Gurumayum Bonny; Leishangthem Rahul; Sonia Hijam; Bala Hijam
- Cinematography: Imo Yumnam
- Edited by: Mohendro (KAMS)
- Music by: O. Geet
- Production companies: Prithi Theatre & Films
- Distributed by: Prithi Theatre & Films
- Release date: 15 November 2015
- Running time: 146 minutes
- Country: India
- Language: Meiteilon (Manipuri)

Kum Kang Kum Kabi Chang (English: Turning Poet In Dry Season) is a 2015 Manipuri film directed by Bishwamittra and produced by S. Minakumari. The film features Gurumayum Bonny, Leishangthem Rahul, Sonia Hijam and Bala Hijam in the lead roles. The story of the film was written by Dr. M. Priyobrata and the screenplay was by Bishwamittra. Kum Kang Kum Kabi Chang was released at MSFDS (Manipur State Film Development Society), Imphal, on 15 November 2015. The film was screened in various theatres of Manipur in March 2016.

Kum Kang Kum Kabi Chang is based on Dr. M. Priyobrata's famous radio drama of the same title. It won the Akashvani National Award. It is Prithi Theatre's first production.

In spite of its good content, the film could not attract large number of audiences in theatres since it was screened just after the stoppage of screening films in theatres and other film-related activities, which was relaxed in March 2016.

== Synopsis ==
The film tells the story of a poet Khoimu, who never cares about anything else, but sees only poetry. It also shows how this affects his family and life.

== Cast ==
- Gurumayum Bonny as Shougrakpam Khoimu
- Leishangthem Rahul as Thabal
- Sonia Hijam as Thambal
- Bala Hijam as Tharo
- Surjit Saikhom as Koklei
- Jasmin Elangbam as Memcha
- Hijam Shyamdhani as Gulap, Thambal's Father
- R.K. Hemabati as Thambal's Mother
- Khelen Singh
- Sarat Salam
- Yumnam Surchandra
- Meidingu Tonjao
- Biswamitra Sharma
- W. Modhuchandra
- Khistina

== Soundtrack ==
O. Geet composed the soundtrack for the film and Bishwamittra and Dr. M. Priyobrata wrote the lyrics. The songs are titled Khwangjenba Khoiraba and Kum Kang Kum Gi Kabi.

Kum Kang Kum Kabi Chang

Soundtrack album by Huidrom Nowboy and Pushparani Huidrom
- Genre: Feature film soundtrack
- Length: 10:23
- Label: Prithi Theatre & Films

No.	Title	Lyrics	Music	Singer(s)	Length
1.	"Khwangjenba Khoiraba"	Dr. M. Priyobrata	O. Geet	Huidrom Nowboy, Pushparani Huidrom	04:22
2.	"Kum Kang Kum Gi Kabi"	Bishwamittra	O. Geet	Pushparani Huidrom	06:01
Total length:					10:23
