= Beragee Bomb =

- Theatrical release poster
- Directed by: Oinam Gautam Singh
- Screenplay by: Laishram Santosh
- Story by: Laishram Santosh
- Produced by: Chingkhei & Khaba
- Starring: Gurumayum Bonny; Leishangthem Tonthoi; Loya (Mukabala); Suraj Sharma Laimayum; Edwin Soibam
- Cinematography: Boong Konjengbam
- Edited by: Oinam Gautam Singh; VFX: Biju
- Music by: Chongtham Vivek (Ali); Background Score: Dina Oinam
- Production company: Chingkhurakpa Art
- Distributed by: Chingkhurakpa Art
- Release date: 31 August 2013
- Running time: 110 minutes
- Country: India
- Language: Meiteilon (Manipuri)

Beragee Bomb is a 2013 Manipuri comedy film directed by O. Gautam and written by Laishram Santosh. It stars Gurumayum Bonny, Leishangthem Tonthoi, Loya, Suraj Sharma Laimayum and Edwin Soibam. The movie was released on 31 August 2013 at MFDC with a Red Carpet Event, hosted by WOL Media for the first time in Manipuri cinema. The official trailer of the film was released by WOL Media on 18 August 2013.

A sequel to the film titled Moreh Maru was produced by RT Motion Pictures and released in 2016.

== Plot ==
Mani and Thoibi decides to elope one day. Manibabu, who constantly threatens Thoibi, learns about it and starts chasing them. As a series of unforeseen events unfolded, the eloping lovebirds and Mani's friends Mangal and Ahenba find themselves hooked around a bomb discovered in a scooter they took from a college parking area. Finally, Mani, Mangal and Ahenba end up eloping with their girlfriends on the same day.

== Cast ==
- Gurumayum Bonny as Manibabu
- Leishangthem Tonthoi as Thoibi
- Edwin Soibam as Mani
- Loya (Mukabala) Maibam as Mangal
- Suraj Sharma Laimayum as Ahenba
- Idhou as Thoibi's Father
- R.K. Hemabati as Thoibi's Mother
- Thokchom Priya as Ahenba's mother
- Ratan Lai as Police
- Arjentina as Ahenba's friend
- Luxmi as Ningthi, Ahenba's girlfriend
- Rosia as Benao, Ningthi's friend
- Surjit Saikhom as Mechanic
- Ballondy Yumnam
- Davin
- Thasana Th. as Mechanic's wife

== Accolades ==
The film won two awards at the 3rd SSS MANIFA 2014.

Award	Category	Winner's name	Result
3rd SSS MANIFA 2014	Best Actor in a Negative Role - Male	Gurumayum Bonny	Won
3rd SSS MANIFA 2014	Best Screenplay	Santosh Laishram	Won

== See also ==
- List of Meitei-language films
