= Langlen Thadoi =

- A scene from the film
- Directed by: M.A. Singh
- Written by: Khaidem Pramodini
- Produced by: Khaidem Sakhi Devi
- Starring: Wangkheirakpam Chandrasakhi; Kongbrailatpam Tejmani; Moirangthem Lalit
- Cinematography: Sooresh Patel
- Edited by: M.A. Singh
- Music by: Sagolsem Tijendra; Audiography: Subash
- Production company: Kay Pee Films International
- Release date: 1984
- Country: India
- Language: Meiteilon (Manipuri)

Langlen Thadoi is a 1984 Manipuri film directed by M.A. Singh (Maibam Amuthoi Singh) and produced by Khaidem Sakhi Devi for Kay Pee Films International. It is the first Manipuri full-length colour film and also the first Manipuri film to be produced by a woman.

== Cast ==
- Wangkheirakpam Chandrasakhi as Thadoi
- Kongbrailatpam Tejmani as Nongyai
- Moirangthem Lalit as Kokngang
- Ibeyaima as Leihao, Thadoi's aunt
- Koireng as Pradhan
- Tamphamani as Ibechaobi
- Ibocha as Kokngang's elder brother
- Radharani as Nongyai's mother
- Sanahanbi as Pradhan's daughter-in-law
- Deben as Doctor
- Birmani as B.D.O.
- Ibomcha as E.O.
- Jaichandra as Instructor
- Ravindra Sharma (Special appearance)

== Soundtrack ==
Sagolsem Tijendra composed the soundtrack and Wangkheirakpam Chandrasakhi and Sagolsem Tijendra are the playback singers. The movie has five songs. The songs are titled Poirei Leibak Kangleipak, Ho Thaba Ho Sajik, Eidi Laija Phangdraba Leipaalni, Palem Nangbu Nungsibi and Pomlaga Loktak Laija Irelthak.
