= Paari (2000 film) =

- Poster
- Directed by: Aribam Syam Sharma; Dance Director: Pukhrambam Dhanajit
- Written by: Aribam Gautam
- Produced by: Children's Film Society, India
- Starring: R.K. Surchandra
- Cinematography: Phurailatpam Imocha; Assistants: Irom Maipak, Yumnam Imo & N. Dilip; Stills: Phurailatpam Swadhinkumar; Videography: Saikhom Bungobi
- Edited by: Ujjal Nandy
- Music by: Ngangom Ebopishak; Sound: A. Shantimo; Music Score: Rhythms of Manipur
- Production companies: Children's Film Society, India
- Distributed by: Ultra India
- Release date: 2000
- Running time: 54 minutes
- Country: India
- Language: Meiteilon (Manipuri)

Paari is a 2000 Manipuri film written by Aribam Gautam and directed by Aribam Syam Sharma. The movie stars R.K. Surchandra in the lead role. This children film is produced by Children's Film Society, India. The movie participated at National Children's Film Festival (NCFF) 2010, Guwahati; 2nd Children's Film Festival and 4th Children's Film Festival 2013, Imphal. Paari was among the films screened at the International Film Festival of India (IFFI) 2015 under the section A special retrospective on ace filmmaker Aribam Syam Sharma.

Paari is the first Manipuri children film.

== Cast ==
- Master R.K. Surchandra as Sanathoi
- Master Telem Imotomba as Tomba
- Master G. Ashutosh as Tomba, Friend of Sanathoi
- Master Jiban as Son of Choukidar
- Lourembam Keshworjit as Iboyaima
- Salam Birendra as Idhou (Grandfather)
- L. Brajabidhu as Sanathoi's father
- Sagolsem Meenakumari as Sanathoi's mother
- Sarojini Shija as Tomba's mother
- Tongbram Babudhon as Forest Choukidar
- M. Kanhaibabu as Forest Guard-I
- Lourembam Boy (Devid) as Doctor
- M. Tomba as Oja Tomba
- R.K. Sanayaima as Sangai Ningthou
