= Cheikhei =

2015 Indian film by Premkumar Paonam

- Theatrical release poster
- Directed by: Premkumar Paonam
- Story by: Premkumar Paonam
- Produced by: Taibi
- Starring: Gurumayum Bonny; Bala Hijam; Suranjit; Artina Thoudam
- Cinematography: Imo Yumnam
- Edited by: Balli
- Music by: A.K. Yangoi
- Production company: Triveni Films
- Distributed by: Triveni Films
- Release date: 13 December 2015
- Country: India
- Language: Meiteilon (Manipuri)

Cheikhei (English: Full Stop) is a 2015 Manipuri film directed by Premkumar Paonam and produced by Taibi, under the banner of Triveni Films and presented by Premila. It stars Gurumayum Bonny, Bala Hijam, Suranjit and Artina Thoudam in the lead roles. The story of the film was written by Premkumar Paonam. A.K. Yangoi composed the soundtrack for the film and Niranjan Usham wrote the lyrics.

Cheikhei was released at MSFDS on 13 December 2015.

== Cast ==
- Gurumayum Bonny as Khamba
- Bala Hijam as Sanatombi
- Suranjit as Mani
- Artina Thoudam
- Elangbam Indu as Khamba's mother
- Idhou
- Tayenjam Mema as Sanatombi's mother
- Hijam Shyamdhani
- Surjit Saikhom
- Thokchom Ibomcha
- Jenny

== Accolades ==
Manipur State Film Awards 2016

- Best Child Artist: Leishangthem Debika
