= Delhi Mellei =

- Theatrical release poster
- Directed by: Ajit Ningthouja
- Screenplay by: R.K. Jiten
- Story by: Mixn Raj; Maheiba Moirangcha
- Produced by: Bishoya Potshangbam
- Starring: Gurumayum Bonny; Bala Hijam
- Cinematography: Naobi Kangla
- Edited by: Balli
- Music by: Poirei Thokchom; Boy Soraisham
- Production company: Rajkumar Films
- Distributed by: Rajkumar Films
- Release dates: 15 November 2014 (Delhi); 21 December 2014 (Manipur)
- Running time: 145 minutes
- Country: India
- Language: Meiteilon (Manipuri)

Delhi Mellei is a 2014 Manipuri film directed by Ajit Ningthouja, produced by Bishoya Potshangbam and presented by Mixn Raj under the banner of Rajkumar Films. It stars Bala Hijam as the titular protagonist with Gurumayum Bonny in the lead roles. The story of the film was written by Mixn Raj and Maheiba Moirangcha. The shooting of the film was mainly done in Delhi.

The film was premiered at Shankar Lal Auditorium, University of Delhi North Campus, New Delhi, on 15 November 2014 and released at Bhagyachandra Open Air Theatre (BOAT), Imphal, Manipur, on 21 December 2014.

The film was also premiered at Physics Auditorium, Punjab University, Chandigarh, on 16 November 2014; St. Patricks Community Hall, Bengaluru on 26 January 2015; Andra Saraswatha Parisab Auditorium, Opposite Aditya Hospital, Hyderabad on 1 February 2015 and Maulana Abdul Kalam Azad Memorial Hall, German Bakery, Karegaon Park, Pune on 15 February 2015. The full movie was officially released by TANTHA in YouTube on 29 June 2015.

== Plot ==
The film is about a lady, Mellei from Manipur, northeast India, who came to Delhi to pursue her studies in Ramjas College, Delhi University but returned empty-handed when she went on a wrong path and wasn't able to tackle the situations and events happening around her with a positive energy.

== Cast ==
- Gurumayum Bonny as Tomthin
- Bala Hijam as Mellei
- Ratan Lai as Gunanu, Tomthin's roommate
- Christy Moirangthem as Sanatombi
- Takhellambam Lokendra as Mellei's father
- Heisnam Geeta as Mellei's mother
- Anu Sagolshem
- Raj Baduria
- Rohen
- Shila
- Telheiba

== Soundtrack ==
Poirei Thokchom and Boy Soraisham composed the soundtrack for the film and Mixn Raj and Maheiba Moirangcha wrote the lyrics. The songs are titled Eigi Delhi Mellei and Lottuna Thamladara.

No.	Title	Lyrics	Music	Singer(s)	Length
1.	"Eigi Delhi Mellei"	Mixn Raj & Maheiba Moirangcha	Astique La	Astique La & Jack R.K.	04:28
2.	"Lottuna Thamladara"	Mixn Raj & Maheiba Moirangcha	Poirei Thokchom	Yumnam Suren	04:50
Total length:					9:18
