= Sanagi Tangbal =

- Poster
- Directed by: Bijgupta Laishram
- Screenplay by: Bijgupta Laishram
- Story by: Bordini
- Produced by: Bordini
- Starring: Gokul Athokpam; Bala Hijam
- Cinematography: Radhamohon
- Edited by: K. Bimol Sharma
- Music by: Sorri Senjam
- Production company: Bordini Films
- Distributed by: Bordini Films
- Release date: 29 April 2014
- Running time: 144 minutes
- Country: India
- Language: Meiteilon (Manipuri)

Sanagi Tangbal (English: Golden Throne) is a 2014 Manipuri film directed by Bijgupta Laishram, produced by Bordini and presented by Sania. It stars Gokul Athokpam and Bala Hijam in the lead roles. The story of the film was written by Bordini, and screenplay by Bijgupta Laishram. The film was premiered at Bhagyachandra Open Air Theatre (BOAT) on 29 April 2014. It was later released in different theatres of Manipur including Pratap Talkies, and the film was a 2014 hit Manipuri film.

== Plot ==
Lingjelthoibi is a hard working college student, who is brought up in a well-to-do family. Her life takes a sharp turn when she is kidnapped by a guy who is working for them. In spite of his irrational actions, she started feeling sympathy for his family. She stands for them. She begins to live in the poor family. She is allowed to continue her study. All the members of the family work hard to support the family and her study. Finally, she became a successful person. On the other hand, Lingjelthoibi's family (parental) falls because of her brothers' unfair means of livelihood. They are doing business of all kind which are popular from time to time. It includes drug and animal trafficking.

== Cast ==
- Gokul Athokpam as Thoungamba
- Bala Hijam as Lingjelthoibi
- Surjit Saikhom as Laingam, Lingjelthoibi's brother
- Moirangthem Sunil Myboy as Kaoba, Lingjelthoibi's brother
- Khekman Ratan as Subol, Lingjelthoibi's brother
- Ashok Seleibam as Lingjelthoibi's brother
- Sanjoy as Bobo, Lingjelthoibi's brother
- SP Ingocha Yanglem as Superintendent of Police
- Idhou as Lingjelthoibi's father
- Thongam Thoithoi as Lingjelthoibi's mother
- Ghanashyam as Home Minister, Lingjelthoibi's uncle
- Irom Shyamkishore as Kunjo, Thoungamba's father
- Wangkhem Lalitkumar as Thoungamba's local guardian
- Laishram Lalitabi as Kunjo's wife
- R.K. Hemabati as High Court judge
- Samjetsabam Mangoljao as Judge
- Narendra Ningomba as Judge
- Oken Thoudam as Police

== Accolades ==
Idhou (Chakpram Rameshchandra) won the Best Actor in a Supporting Role - Male at the 9th Manipur State Film Awards 2014. The citation for the award reads, "For his versatility on presenting a range of expression on responding to varied senses and emotions of a father overly concerned with material possessions and power rather than valuing humane essence."

== Reception ==
khonjel.org wrote, "Bala is the centre of this story. Her presentation is really nice. However, when it comes to personify an officer, she needs to work out a bit more. I will rate this movie 6.3 out of 10. This movie encourages the viewers to dream big. It also shows the present scenario of Manipur law and order dilemma."

== Soundtrack ==
Sorri Senjam composed the soundtrack for the film and Bijgupta Laishram wrote the lyrics. The songs are titled Achikpa Ahinggi Chiklaba Thabalda and Lonna Kana Khanghandana.

| No. | Title | Lyrics | Music | Singer(s) | Length |
|---|---|---|---|---|---|
| 1. | "Achikpa Ahinggi Chiklaba Thabalda" | Bijgupta Laishram | Sorri Senjam | Pushparani Huidrom | 06:14 |
| 2. | "Lonna Kana Khanghandana" | Bijgupta Laishram | Sorri Senjam | Yumnam Suren, Sushmita Mangsatabam | 04:56 |
| Total length: | | | | | 11:10 |
