= Bangladeshki Sana Tampha =

- Theatrical release poster
- Directed by: OC Meira
- Screenplay by: Manaobi MM
- Story by: Yaiskul Khwairakpam
- Produced by: Rakesh Naorem; Ibungohal Shyamal
- Starring: Gurumayum Bonny; Abenao Elangbam; Bala Tensubam; Narmada Sougaijam; Gepelina Mayanglambam; Ashok Seleibam
- Cinematography: Imo Yumnam
- Edited by: Birjit Arambam
- Music by: Nanao Sagolmang
- Production company: Ipak Films
- Distributed by: World Expression Pictures
- Release date: 25 January 2020
- Country: India
- Language: Meiteilon (Manipuri)

Bangladeshki Sana Tampha is a 2020 multi-starrer Manipuri film directed by OC Meira and produced by Rakesh Naorem and Ibungohal Shyamal, under the banner of Ipak Films. Portraying the lifestyle of Meiteis in Bangladesh, the film stars Gurumayum Bonny, Abenao Elangbam, Bala Tensubam, Narmada Sougaijam, Gepelina Mayanglambam and Ashok Seleibam in the lead roles. The movie was released at Manipur State Film Development Society (MSFDS) on 25 January 2020.

== Cast ==
- Gurumayum Bonny
- Abenao Elangbam
- Bala Tensubam as Sana
- Narmada Sougaijam as Tampha
- Gepelina Mayanglambam
- Ashok Seleibam as Thoiba
- Shilviya
- Khoirom Loya

== Accolades ==
The movie bagged three awards at the 13th Manipur State Film Awards 2020.

Award	Category	Winner's name	Result
13th Manipur State Film Awards 2020	Best Actor in a Supporting Role - Female	Narmada Sougaijam	Won
13th Manipur State Film Awards 2020	Best Playback Singer - Female	Rosy Heisnam	Won
13th Manipur State Film Awards 2020	Best Music Director	Sorokhaibam Premkumar	Won
5th Reels International Film Festival 2025, Aurangabad	Best Feature Film	Producer: Rakesh Naorem; Director: OC Meira	Won
5th Reels International Film Festival 2025, Aurangabad	Best Story	Yaiskul Khwairakpam	Won

== Soundtrack ==
Nanao Sagolmang composed the songs for the movie and Manaobi MM and OC Meira wrote the lyrics. The film has two songs.

No.	Title	Lyrics	Music	Singer(s)	Length
1.	"Nungshikhreda Nungshibi Nangse"	Manaobi MM	Nanao Sagolmang	Rosy Heisnam	5:05
2.	"Khogaiduna Thambiramone Thamoise"	OC Meira	Nanao Sagolmang	Surma Chanu, SK Mangang	5:44
Total length:					10:49

== See also ==
- List of Meitei-language films
