= Manipur Dramatic Union =

Theatre group in Manipur, India

Manipur Dramatic Union (MDU) is the oldest theatre group in Manipur, India. It was established on 15 March 1931.

By March 2012, MDU had produced 198 long plays of various categories and 34 short plays in experimental format (total of 232 plays). MDU produces at least two new long plays and short play every year. MDU stages "Tikendrajit" in August, "Krishna Avataar" on Janmsatami and "Lamyanba Irabot" in September every year.
