= Mr. Khadang =

Mr. Khadang: Animals are Human
- Theatrical release poster
- Directed by: Chou En Lai
- Screenplay by: Momocha Konthoujam
- Story by: Momocha Konthoujam
- Produced by: Laishram Premila
- Starring: Gurumayum Bonny; Bala Hijam
- Cinematography: Boong Konjengbam
- Edited by: Joykishan
- Production company: Anouba Maikei Productions
- Distributed by: Anouba Maikei Productions
- Release dates: 20 August 2017 (Delhi); 1 October 2017 (Manipur)
- Running time: 145 minutes
- Country: India
- Language: Meiteilon (Manipuri)

Mr. Khadang: Animals are Human (English: Mr. Chatterbox) is a 2017 Manipuri film directed by Chou En Lai and produced by Laishram Premila, under the banner of Anouba Maikei Productions. It stars Gurumayum Bonny in the title role. The movie won the Best Feature Film Award at the 7th SSS MANIFA 2018. It was released at Range Ground, Yaiskul on 1 October 2017. It was also premiered at Shankar Lal Auditorium, North Campus, University of Delhi, on 20 August 2017.

== Plot ==
The film centers around Mani, also known as Mr. Khadang for being a chatterbox, but what he speaks is always the truth. A lie once told due to certain circumstances makes him to be very wrongly taken by his girlfriend Thadoi. The series of events that follows due to the lie told, changes him to a completely different person, ultimately proving everyone that Mr. Khadang is not a worthless person.

== Cast ==
- Gurumayum Bonny as Maibam Mani Meitei aka Mr. Khadang
- Bala Hijam as Thadoi
- Redy Yumnam as Thanil
- Ithoi Oinam as Langlen
- Thingom Pritam as Sanatomba, Mani's brother
- Ningthoujam Rina as Santomba's wife
- Laishram Lalitabi as Mani's mother
- Idhou as Khura
- Surjit Saikhom as Thoiba
- Kajal Mutum as Thaja
- Nandakumar Nongmaithem as Dr. Loya, Surgeon
- Soma Laishram as Maibam Likla, Mani's Daughter (Cameo Appearance/Narrator)
- Ratan Lai as Journalist (Cameo Appearance)

== Accolades ==
Mr. Khadang won awards at the 7th Sahitya Seva Samiti Awards (SSS MANIFA) 2018, including the Best Feature Film Award.

Award	Category	Winner's name	Result
7th SSS MANIFA 2018	Best Feature Film	Producer: Laishram Premila; Director: Chou En Lai	Won
7th SSS MANIFA 2018	Best Director	Chou En Lai	Won
7th SSS MANIFA 2018	Best Story	Momocha Konthoujam	Won
7th SSS MANIFA 2018	Best Make-Up	Jenny Khurai	Won

== Soundtrack ==
Tony Aheibam composed the soundtrack for the film and Sairem Paikhomba Meitei wrote the lyrics. The song is titled Punshi Lamjel.

No.	Title	Lyrics	Music	Singer(s)	Length
1.	"Punshi Lamjel"	Sairem Paikhomba Meitei	Tony Aheibam; Vno Waribam(tune)	Arbin Soibam	04:09
Total length:					4:09
