= Nungshit Mapi =

- Theatrical release poster
- Directed by: Ajit Ningthouja
- Screenplay by: Herojit Naoroibam
- Story by: Herojit Naoroibam
- Produced by: Reshi Thokchom
- Starring: Rajkumar Kaiku; Bala Hijam
- Cinematography: Mohon Kangla
- Edited by: Ajit Ningthouja
- Music by: Sorri Senjam
- Production company: Evening Star Films
- Distributed by: DIS Construction Material Pvt. Limited
- Release dates: 13 June 2015 (Manipur); 25 July 2015 (Delhi)
- Running time: 135 minutes
- Country: India
- Language: Meiteilon (Manipuri)

Nungshit Mapi is a 2015 Manipuri film directed by Ajit Ningthouja, written by Herojit Naoroibam and produced by Reshi Thokchom, presented by DIS Construction Material Pvt. Limited. It stars Kaiku Rajkumar, Bala Hijam and Bonium Thokchom in the lead roles. The film was released on 13 June 2015 at Bhagyachandra Open Air Theatre (BOAT). It was also premiered at Shankar Lal Auditorium, University of Delhi, New Delhi on 25 July 2015.

== Cast ==
- Kaiku Rajkumar as Amuba
- Bala Hijam as Thambal
- Bonium Thokchom as Thouna
- Hamom Sadananda as Amuba's Friend, Fake CBI Officer
- Idhou as MLA
- Rojesh Saikhom as Kengba
- Harish Phu as Chaoba
- Nandakumar Nongmaithem
- Tej Kshetri as Ta Yaima, Fake CBI Officer
- Thoudam Ongbi Modhubala as Mukta
- R.K. Hemabati as MLA's Wife
- Laimayum Gaitri as Silleima
- Santosh as Eigya Borajao
- Laishram Lalitabi
- Premjit Naoroibam as MLA's Worker
- Sunny Naoshekpam
- Suresh Melei as Kiyamlikfang
- Chan Heisnam
- Chinglen Thiyam as MLA Y. Tompok
- Takhellambam Lokendra as Chief Minister L. Loken

== Reception ==
khonjel.org wrote about Bala Hijam in Nungshit Mapi, "Nungshit Mapi presents a different side of Bala. Bala is working hard to be the centre of attraction in this upcoming movie. Thambal (Bala) is a married woman struggling for her womanhood. By womanhood, I mean the entitlements on rights for a woman."

== Soundtrack ==
Sorri Senjam composed the soundtrack for the film and Ajit Ningthouja wrote the lyrics. The songs are titled Oihallasi Nungaiba Lamdam and Nungshit Mapi.

No.	Title	Lyrics	Music	Singer(s)	Length
1.	"Oihallasi Nungaiba Lamdam"	Ajit Ningthouja	Sorri Senjam	Sorri Senjam, Hamom Sadananda, Yumnam Suren, Bonium Thokchom, Pushparani Huidrom, Sushmita Mangsatabam, Chitra Pangambam, Surma Chanu	09:09
2.	"Nungshit Mapi"	Ajit Ningthouja	Sorri Senjam	Jack RK & James Keisham	03:36
Total length:					12:45
