= Ichadi Manini =

2019 Manipuri film

- Theatrical release poster
- Directed by: Geet Yumnam
- Screenplay by: Binoranjan Oinam
- Story by: Binoranjan Oinam
- Produced by: Ningthoujam Malakumari
- Starring: Amar Mayanglambam; Bala Hijam
- Cinematography: Mohon Kangla
- Edited by: Mohendro (KAMS)
- Music by: Surmani (Rishi); Background Score: R.K. Birendrajit
- Production company: MS Films
- Distributed by: MS Films
- Release date: 28 July 2019
- Running time: 137 minutes
- Country: India
- Language: Meiteilon (Manipuri)

Ichadi Manini (English: My Son is a Gem) is a 2019 Manipuri film directed by Geet Yumnam and produced by Ningthoujam Malakumari. It stars Amar Mayanglambam and Bala Hijam in the lead roles. The movie won two awards at the 13th Manipur State Film Awards 2020. The film was released at Bhagyachandra Open Air Theatre (BOAT), Palace Compound, Imphal on 28 July 2019.

== Plot ==
The well going Meiraba's family is broken into fragments due to the immoral acts of his father, Thoiba. He develops illicit affairs with a married lady Sakhenbi. This leads Meiraba to sacrifice his youth life for his mother and sister. Yaiphabi, Meiraba's girlfriend, tries to help him in every possible ways. But certain unforeseen circumstances makes Meiraba distance himself from his girlfriend. The clueless Yaiphabi agrees to tie knot with a stranger guy out of frustration. When she knows the truth, she leaves everything and stands for Meiraba. They are united again. Thoiba also realises his mistakes and comes back for forgiveness and rebuilding of his shattered family.

== Cast ==
- Amar Mayanglambam as Meiraba
- Bala Hijam as Yaiphabi
- Denny Likmabam as Thoiba, Meiraba's father
- Ningthoujam Rina as Meiraba's mother
- Thoinao as Echantombi, Meiraba's younger sister
- Premeshori as Sakhenbi
- Idhou as Yaiphabi's father
- Ratan Lai as Telheiba, Goldsmith
- Prasanta Oinam as Lukhoi, Meiraba's friend
- Jenny Khurai as Beautician
- Linthoi Chanu as Yaiphabi's Aunty
- R.K. Hemabati as Sakhenbi's mother
- Bindiya as Sakhenbi's daughter

== Accolades ==
Amar Mayanglambam and Ningthoujam Rina won the Best Actor in a Leading Role (Male) and Special Jury Awards respectively at the 13th Manipur State Film Awards 2020.

Ichadi Manini got two titles out of the nominated five at 9th MANIFA 2020.

Award	Category	Winner's name	Result
13th Manipur State Film Awards 2020	Best Actor in a Leading Role - Male	Amar Mayanglambam	Won
13th Manipur State Film Awards 2020	Special Jury Award	Ningthoujam Rina	Won
9th MANIFA 2020	Special Jury Award	Amar Mayanglambam	Won
9th MANIFA 2020	Best Actor in a Supporting Role - Female	Ningthoujam Rina	Won
9th MANIFA 2020	Best Costume	Karan Thokchom	Nominated
9th MANIFA 2020	Best Audiography	Mohendro	Nominated
9th MANIFA 2020	Best Editing	Mohendro KAMS	Nominated

== Music ==
Surmani (Rishi) composed the soundtrack for the film and Binoranjan Oinam wrote the lyrics. The songs are titled Thammoigee Meehul and Hey Punshi. The online copyrights of the songs were procured by Mami Taibang.

No.	Title	Lyrics	Music	Singer(s)	Length
1.	"Thammoigee Meehul"	Binoranjan Oinam	Surmani (Rishi)	Aj Maisnam, Surma Chanu	05:21
2.	"Hey Punshi"	Binoranjan Oinam	Surmani (Rishi)	Arbin Soibam, Pushparani Huidrom	04:14
Total length:					9:35
