= Tamoyaigee Ebecha =

- Theatrical release poster
- Directed by: Pilu Heigrujam
- Screenplay by: Narendra Ningomba
- Story by: Pilu Heigrujam
- Produced by: Radha & Sunita Keinou
- Starring: Gurumayum Bonny; Bala Hijam
- Cinematography: Nanda Ch.
- Edited by: Pilu Heigrujam
- Music by: Bishow Ch. & Sorri Senjam
- Production company: Lainingthou Lam Ahingba Films
- Distributed by: Lainingthou Lam Ahingba Films
- Release date: 27 December 2013
- Running time: 189 minutes
- Country: India
- Language: Meiteilon (Manipuri)

Tamoyaigee Ebecha is a 2013 Manipuri film written and directed by Pilu Heigrujam and produced by Radha and Sunita Keinou. It stars Gurumayum Bonny and Bala Hijam in the titular roles. The film was released at Bhagyachandra Open Air Theatre (BOAT), Imphal, on 27 December 2013. Initially, the film was banned by Film Forum Manipur and MEELAL, the reason being containing vulgar lyrics in the song Sire Sire Nungaibana Sire. It was then changed from Sire Sire Nungaibana Sire to Sire Sire Nungshibana Sire.

== Cast ==
- Gurumayum Bonny as Tamoyai
- Bala Hijam as Ebecha
- Sonia Hijam
- Vidyananda Laishram as Shanou
- Wangkhem Lalitkumar
- Narendra Ningomba
- Laishram Lalitabi
- Philem Puneshori
- Bebeto

== Soundtrack ==
Sorri Senjam and Bishow Ch. Composed the soundtrack for the film and Khaidem Imo and Paresh wrote the lyrics. The songs are titled Sire Sire Nungshibana Sire and Mikup Khuding. The playback singers are Raj Elangbam, Surma Chanu and Chitra Pangambam. The song Sire Sire Nungshibana Sire became popular among the youth.
