= Chow Chow Momo na Haobara Shingju Bora na Oinambara =

- Theatrical release poster
- Directed by: R.K. Jiten
- Written by: R.K. Jiten
- Produced by: L. Dayabati
- Starring: Gurumayum Bonny; Bala Hijam; Sushmita Mangsatabam
- Cinematography: Imo Yumnam
- Edited by: Balli
- Music by: R.K. Jiten
- Production company: Leishangthem Films
- Distributed by: Leishangthem Films
- Release date: 27 October 2013
- Running time: 155 minutes
- Country: India
- Language: Meiteilon (Manipuri)

Chow Chow Momo na Haobara Shingju Bora na oinambara (English: Is Chow Chow Momo Tasty Or Shingju Bora Delicious) is a 2013 Manipuri film directed by R.K. Jiten and produced by L. Dayabati, under the banner of Leishangthem Films and presented by Mixn Raj. The film features Gurumayum Bonny, Bala Hijam and Sushmita Mangsatabam in the lead roles. The film was also screened in Punjab on 13 October 2013. It was released at Manipur Film Development Corporation (MFDC), Palace Compound on 27 October 2013 and at Bhagyachandra Open Air Theatre (BOAT) on 3 November 2013. There were also theatrical releases of the film at Pratap Talkies, Paona Bazar, and many other theatres of Manipur in December 2013.

== About ==
The film sketches the romance between Mani and Nungshitombi and also shows the consequences met by Manglembi due to cybercrime. Gurumayum Bonny plays a double role in the film.

== Cast ==
- Gurumayum Bonny as Mani
- Bala Hijam as Nungshitombi
- Sushmita Mangsatabam as Manglembi
- Ratan Lai
- Takhellambam Lokendra as Manglembi's father
- R.K. Hemabati as Manglembi's mother
- Samjetsabam Mangoljao
- Heisnam Geeta
- Ayekpam Shanti
- Abung Dang

== Soundtrack ==
Chow Chow Momo na haobara Shingju Borana Oinambara

Soundtrack album by Huidrom Nowboy, Sushmita Mangsatabam, Suren Yumnam, Tingku Paonam
- Genre: Feature film soundtrack
- Length: 14:12
- Label: Leishangthem Films

R.K. Jiten composed the soundtrack for the film and Prane and Akendra Tensuba wrote the lyrics. The songs are titled Leiraroidara Khallui, Pamdi Pamba Tin Yotpa and Ningthou Machasu Kallakte.

No.	Title	Lyrics	Music	Singer(s)	Length
1.	"Leiraroidara Khallui"	Prane Yungkham	R.K. Jiten	Huidrom Nowboy, Sushmita Mangsatabam	05:05
2.	"Pamdi Pamba Tin Yotpa"	BALLI	R.K. Jiten	Tingku Paonam	04:01
3.	"Ningthou Machasu Kallakte"	Akendra Tensuba	R.K. Jiten	Suren Yumnam, Sushmita Mangsatabam	05:06
Total length:					14:12
