= Inamma =

2019 Manipuri film

- Theatrical release poster
- Directed by: Khoibam Homeshwori
- Screenplay by: Ranjit Ningthouja
- Story by: Ranjit Ningthouja
- Produced by: Takhellambam Chandrakumar
- Starring: Bala Hijam; Gokul Athokpam; Gurumayum Bonny; Devita Urikhinbam; Silheiba Ningthoujam; Biju Ningombam
- Cinematography: Sanjit XL
- Edited by: Sanjit XL
- Music by: Nanao Sagolmang
- Production company: Home Films
- Distributed by: Home Films
- Release date: 14 September 2019
- Running time: 153 minutes
- Country: India
- Language: Meiteilon (Manipuri)

Inamma (English: Elder Sister-In-Law) is a 2019 Manipuri film directed by Khoibam Homeshwori and produced by Takhellambam Chandrakumar, under the banner of Home Films. The movie stars Bala Hijam in the title role. The other leading actors in the movie are Gokul Athokpam, Gurumayum Bonny, Devita Urikhinbam, Silheiba Ningthoujam and Biju Ningombam. It was premiered at Bhagyachandra Open Air Theatre (BOAT), Imphal on 14 September 2019.

The film is based on the Shumang Kumhei of the same title. In Shumang Kumhei, there is a sequel titled Mama (Inamma 2). But the stories of both the Shumang Kumheis are put together in the single movie.

== Plot ==
Arubi often plots against her Inamma, Memtombi, for no good reason. Chingkheinganba is aware but never acts against his sister for the sake of maintaining peace in the family. When one of Arubi's plan against Memtombi fails miserably and her brother gets to face the consequences, she elopes with her boyfriend Ngahakchao. When Bem (Ngahakchao's sister) treats her Inamma, Arubi with care and respect, Arubi is filled with regret and remorse for her acts done to her Inamma. She begs for forgiveness. Unfortunately, Memtombi dies while giving birth to her first child. To make up for the loss, Arubi plans to marry Bem to her brother. This creates a tension among the lovebirds Bem and Nongyai, the latter also happens to be Memtombi's younger brother. When Chingkheinganba discovers this, he foils Arubi's plan.

== Cast ==
- Bala Hijam as Memtombi
- Gokul Athokpam as Chingkheinganba, Memtombi's husband
- Gurumayum Bonny as Ngahakchao
- Devita Urikhinbam as Arubi, Memtombi's sister-in-law
- Silheiba Ningthoujam as Dr. Nongyai, Memtombi's younger brother
- Biju Ningombam as Bem, Ngahakchao's younger sister
- Ningthouja Jayvidya as Pakchao, Arubi's father
- Idhou as Agor Momon, Ngahakchao's father

== Accolades ==
Inamma won two awards out of 6 nominations at the 9th MANIFA 2020 organised by Sahitya Seva Samiti, Kakching.

Award	Category	Winner's name	Result
9th MANIFA 2020	Best Actor in a Leading Role - Female	Bala Hijam	Won
9th MANIFA 2020	Best Actor in a Leading Role - Male	Gokul Athokpam	Won
9th MANIFA 2020	Best Feature Film	Director: Homeshwori; Producer: Takhellambam Chandrakumar	Nominated
9th MANIFA 2020	Best Costume	Galif Pa	Nominated
9th MANIFA 2020	Best Art Director	Hei Sanjit	Nominated
9th MANIFA 2020	Best Choreography	Babycha Salam	Nominated

== Soundtrack ==
Nanao Sagolmang composed the soundtrack for the film and Rajmani Ayekpam and Ranjit Ningthouja wrote the lyrics. The songs are titled Leinana Yomlibi and Nungshikhreda.

No.	Title	Lyrics	Music	Singer(s)	Length
1.	"Leinana Yomlibi"	Rajmani Ayekpam	Nanao Sagolmang	Arbin Soibam, Pushparani Huidrom, SK Mangang, Danubi, Roshan Thoudam, Kabira	06:12
2.	"Nungshikhreda"	Ranjit Ningthouja	Nanao Sagolmang	Huidrom Nowboy, Pushparani Huidrom	04:55
Total length:					11:07
