= Ureinung =

- Theatrical release poster
- Directed by: Pilu Heigrujam
- Screenplay by: Joy Soram
- Story by: Pilu Heigrujam
- Produced by: Bandana Maisnam & Ilu
- Starring: Leishangthem Rahul; Sonia Samjetsabam
- Cinematography: Sanjoy Ch.
- Edited by: Pilu Heigrujam
- Music by: G. Hemchandra; A.R. Inao; Background Score: Bishow Ch.
- Production company: Bandana Films
- Distributed by: Bandana Films
- Release date: 30 October 2013
- Running time: 112 minutes
- Country: India
- Language: Meiteilon (Manipuri)

Ureinung is a 2013 Manipuri film directed by Pilu Heigrujam and produced by Bandana Maisnam and Ilu, under the banner of Bandana films. It stars Sonia Samjetsabam as the titular protagonist with Leishangthem Rahul in the lead roles. The film was released at Manipur Film Development Corporation (MFDC) on 30 October 2013 and at Bhagyachandra Open Air Theatre (BOAT) on 6 November 2013.

Ureinung is based on the music video of the same title, which stars Nirmal Kangjam and Sonia Samjetsabam. In the film, Nirmal Kangjam is replaced by Leishangthem Rahul and Sonia Hijam by Chitra Pangambam.

== Cast ==
- Sonia Samjetsabam as Ureinung
- Leishangthem Rahul as Poireinganba
- Bebeto as Ningthou Manao Ibungo
- Elangbam Indu as Ureinung's foster mother
- Denny Likmabam as Ureinung's father
- Dev as Ningthou
- Chitra Pangambam as Leimarel
- Raj Elangbam as Selungba
- Arya as Sagol Hanjaba
- Samjetsabam Mangoljao as Poireinganba
- Bidyalaxmi
- Mango

== Soundtrack ==
G. Hemchandra and A.R. Inao composed the soundtrack for the film and Mantri Meitei wrote the lyrics. The songs are titled Nungsi Nangbu Ureinung and Konggoi Khuroure Lakaanung.

No.	Title	Lyrics	Music	Singer(s)	Length
1.	"Nungsi Nangbu Ureinung"	Mantri Meitei	G. Hemchandra	Raj Elangbam, Premlata	05:05
2.	"Konggoi Khuroure Lakaanung"	Mantri Meitei	A.R. Inao	Raj Elangbam, Chitra Pangabam	05:02
Total length:					10:07

== Reception ==
Writing about Sonia Samjetsabam for Hueiyen Lanpao, Meira and Soibam opined that "Sonia Samjetsabam has made a mark in Manipuri film world with a lead role in the film "Ureinung'".
