= Chaphu =

2019 Manipuri film

- Theatrical release poster
- Directed by: Satyajit BK
- Written by: Satyajit BK
- Produced by: R.K. Bikramjit
- Starring: Bala Tensubam; Bobo Ningthoukhongjam
- Cinematography: Sanjoy Ch.
- Edited by: Sur Mangang
- Music by: Tenao HD; Audiography: Tom Maisnam
- Production company: Sakhi Shija Films
- Distributed by: Soraren Films
- Release dates: 27 October 2019 (BOAT); 16 January 2026 (Tanthapolis Cinema)
- Running time: 136 minutes
- Country: India
- Language: Meiteilon (Manipuri)

Chaphu (lit. 'Pot') is a 2019 Manipuri film written and directed by Satyajit BK and produced by R.K. Bikramjit. It is a realistic thriller movie based on rituals, beliefs and black arts. The movie was premiered at Bhagyachandra Open Air Theatre (BOAT), Palace Compound, on 27 October 2019. It won three awards at the 13th Manipur State Film Festival 2020.

== Plot ==
Different groups of people have their ethnic culture, rituals and beliefs. The art of witch craft and voodoo has long been associating with the human since time immemorial. Even as the advancement of science is at its height, these phenomenons of voodoo are not able to be wiped out rather than saying that it is a form of superstition. Till today, many are practising the art of witch craft. There are many yarns that have been continuing in oral form from generation to generation, which many believe to be true. It is not that there are many who do not believe in this matter. Believing these crafts remain within one as such may be decided to be true or not when it happens personally to one.

Thanil tried to find whether the voodoo really exists or not. The homestead land of Thoiba was the cause to create enmity between Thoiba and his uncle. The uncle removed a cadaver of a baby that was entombed by putting it within a pitcher and cast the evil by practicing voodoo and caused a lot of trouble of which Thoiba's wife became insane. Thoiba who does not believe voodoo consulted physicians for treatment of his wife. The syndrome is relieved sometimes but it restarted again. Sometimes, fraud shaman swindled them to extort money from them. At last, in an effort to find the truth of the entity, Thanil tried to help the family of Thoiba to exercise the evil form Leihao. Within the trial of the three years, Thanil began to believe the art of voodoo with many strange incidents. Leihao was never relieved from the insanity and she went astray.

== Cast ==
- Bala Tensubam as Leihao
- Bobo Ningthoukhongjam as Thoiba
- Aheibam Chiranjit as Chingkhei
- Gurumayum Priyogopal as Thanil, Researcher
- Idhou as Nongyai's father
- Deepak Mutum as Nongyai
- Khwairakpam Bishwamittra as Police
- Tenao HD as Maimu
- Thangjam Jatishor as Lakpa
- Yengkhom Ingocha
- Khekman Devan
- Thangjam Manjita

== Accolades ==
Chaphu won three awards at the 13th Manipur State Film Awards 2020. It also earned four nominations at the 9th MANIFA 2020.

Award	Category	Winner's name	Result
13th Manipur State Film Awards 2020	Best Actor in a Leading Role - Female	Bala Tensubam	Won
13th Manipur State Film Awards 2020	Best Actor in a Supporting Role - Male	Idhou (Chakpram Rameshchandra)	Won
13th Manipur State Film Awards 2020	Best Special Effect	Thoudam Surchandra Meetei (Sur Mangang)	Won
9th MANIFA 2020	Best Actor in a Leading Role - Female	Bala Tensubam	Nominated
9th MANIFA 2020	Best Actor in a Supporting Role - Male	Gurumayum Priyogopal Sharma	Nominated
9th MANIFA 2020	Best Playback Singer - Male	Yumnam Suren	Nominated
9th MANIFA 2020	Best Make-Up	A. Ragini; W. Chandrima	Nominated

== Soundtrack ==
Tenao HD composed the soundtrack for the film and Satyajit BK wrote the lyrics. The song is titled Epaang Kana Yaodana.

Chaphu

Soundtrack album by Yumnam Suren
- Released: 2019
- Studio: Soraren Films
- Genre: Feature film soundtrack
- Length: 4:55
- Label: Sakhi Shija Films
- Producer: R.K. Bikramjit

No.	Title	Lyrics	Music	Singer(s)	Length
1.	"Epaang Kana Yaodana"	Satyajit BK	Tenao HD	Yumnam Suren	04:55
Total length:					4:55
