= Homen D' Wai =

Indian film director (1970–2021)

- Born: Homendro Waikhom; 1970; Sagolband Thangjam Leirak, Imphal West, Manipur
- Died: 10 July 2021 (aged 50–51)
- Occupations: Director, Scriptwriter, Lyricist
- Spouse: Waikhom Ongbi Ngangbi

Homen D' Wai (full name: Homendro Waikhom, 1970 – 10 July 2021) was an Indian film director, scriptwriter and lyricist from Imphal, Manipur. Dr. Yaima, Mittrang Keithel, Yaiskulgee Pakhang Angaoba, Dr. Hemogee Heloi and VDF Thasana were some of the famous movies he directed.

== Career ==
Homen D' Wai started his career in movies under the guidance of K. Ibohal Sharma. He worked as an assistant cinematographer in the 1993 Ibohal Sharma's directorial venture Sambal Wangma. Later, he went on to direct music videos which became hit song numbers of the time. The first feature film directed by him was Raja, a 2003 movie. His 2004 feature Dr. Yaima became a hit and ran at Friends' Talkies, Paona Bazar successfully for more than 100 days. His movies Mr. Lakhipyari (2005) and Mittrang Keithel (2006) had successful theatrical run in Friends' Talkies and Usha Cinema respectively for more than 50 days.

He also attempted to re-unite the Manipuris living in the state and Meiteis from states like Assam, Tripura through his films. These efforts could be seen in his movies like Nungshibi Ahing (2008) and Govindagee Sharik Makhol (2010). Yaiskulgee Pakhang Angaoba (2011) and Dr. Hemogee Heloi (2013) were films of Homen D' Wai which made records in the box office at a time when Manipuri cinema's popularity among the masses slowed down. His last directorial venture was Ei Actor Natte (2019). Most of his movies were flavoured with comic, humorous elements. But his versatility as a filmmaker could be seen in movies like Nungshibi Ahing (2008) and Kekoo Lotpee (2008). The blessing ceremony of a new movie Sendoidi Ahing Tumde with Homen D' Wai as the director was held in 2021 but he died even before the shooting could commence. He also had plans to make four other movies (Yaiskulgee Pakhang Angaoba 2, Dr. Hemogee Heloi 2, Khabei Chegap Dot Com and Phanekse Kanagino) which he had finished scripting.

He died on 10 July 2021, from COVID-19 complications. He was also undergoing dialysis at Shija Hospital, Imphal due to kidney failure.

== Accolades ==
Homen D' Wai received the Best Director, Best Lyricist, Best Screenplay and Best Feature Film awards at the 8th Manipur State Film Festival 2013 for his work in the movie Yaiskulgee Pakhang Angaoba. He also won the Best Lyricist award for a song in the movie VDF Thasana at the 9th Manipur State Film Awards 2014. His 2019 movie Ei Actor Natte won the Best Popular Film Providing Wholesome Entertainment award at the 13th Manipur State Film Awards 2020. The citation for the award reads, "Most of the sequences of the film Ei Actor Natte provide amusement tickling the viewers in an emotional narrative promoting a moral health and invoicing the general interest of cine-goers. With this views, the film has been adjudged for the Award of the Best Popular Film Providing Wholesome Entertainment, 2020".

== Filmography ==
Year	Film	Studio
2003	Raja	Maxima Films Inc.
2004	Dr. Yaima	Milky Way Films
2005	Mr. Lakhipyari	Emoinu Films
2006	Mittrang Keithel	Treasure Island
2006	Quarter No. 16	Dip Film
2007	Ngashidagi Hourashi	Kristy Imphal Production
2008	Nungshibi Ahing	Diana Films
2008	Kekoo Lotpee	Treasure Island
2009	Leeklam	Nongpok Mashu Taibang Films
2009	Yumleima Lamleima	Seema Films
2010	Govindagee Sharik Makhol	Ibudhou Thangjing Films
2011	Yaiskulgee Pakhang Angaoba	Kangla Films, Manipur
2012	Highway 39: Punshi Lambida	Kangla Films, Manipur
2013	Dr. Hemogee Heloi	Penu Leima Film & TV
2013	Kundorei	Penu Leima Film & TV
2014	VDF Thasana	Robin Color Picture
2015	Eidi Thamoi Pikhre	Ebudhou Marjing Films
2017	Ningtha	Chin Films
2019	Ei Actor Natte	Imphal Star Films
