= List of Meitei-language films of 2021 =

It is a list of films in Meiteilon (Manipuri) released in 2021, certified by India's Central Board of Film Certification (CBFC). Eikhoigi Yum won the National Film Award for Best Manipuri Feature Film at the 69th National Film Awards.

Certification date	Title	Director	Cast	Studio (Production house)	Ref
10 March 2021	Khutsha Ani 2	I.S. Gurung	Silheiba Ningthoujam; Sushmita Mangsatabam; Khekman Ratan	Chin Films	
10 August 2021	Rongdaife	Bobby Haobam	Leishangthem Tonthoi; Somen Chanam; Nunglen Luwang	VINTel Infracom Private Limited	
30 August 2021	Ima Machet Icha Tangkhai	Khoibam Homeshwori	Gokul Athokpam; Gurumayum Bonny; Abenao Elangbam; Soma Laishram; Luwangthoibi Chanu	Luwang Films	
31 August 2021	Nungshi Keithel	Mangal Chabungbam	Biju Ningombam; Silheiba Ningthoujam; Gurumayum Bonny; Sushitra Wangkhem	Ngangkhaleima Picture	
31 August 2021	Naitom Pokpi	Nirmal Kangjam	Suraj Ngashepam; Sanjuna Likmabam	Lucky 7 Star	
8 November 2021	Larei Lathup	Ojitbabu Ningthoujam	Silheiba Ningthoujam; Ithoi Oinam	Manira Movies	
8 November 2021	Kokchak Returns	Chingkhei Thok	Tyson; Surbala; Lamnganbi; Bloomy; Mukteshori	Kanglei Art Foundations	
8 November 2021	Hiyainu	Gyanand	Jackson Yumnam; Bindiya Moirangthem; Naorem Pilot	Youth Explore TV	
10 November 2021	P.T.O. Liklam Tung Illakho	Gyanand	Naorem Pilot; Sonia Samjetsabam; Baby Lilyka; Sangrilla Hijam	Dreams Production	
19 November 2021	Satlo Leirang Satlo	Ojitbabu Ningthoujam	Silheiba Ningthoujam; Biju Ningombam; Ithoi Oinam	Manira Movies	
8 December 2021	Numit Tha	Sudhir Kangjam	Araba Laitonjam; Biju Ningombam; Nishikanta	Taruni Films	
8 December 2021	Lairembi	Sudhir Kangjam	Gokul Athokpam; Soma Laishram; Denny Likmabam; Devita Urikhinbam	Sirius Films	
8 December 2021	Nang Chenlu Ei Tanarakke	Geet Yumnam	Gokul Athokpam; Sonia Samjetsabam; Bonisha Yambem	Ibemhal Films	
13 December 2021	Shamjabee	Premkumar Paonam	Gokul Athokpam; Bala Hijam; Surjit Saikhom; Premeshori; Ratan Lai	Triveni Films	
13 December 2021	Nangsu Khangu	Khoibam Homeshwori	Suraj Ngashepam; Nicky Sorokhaibam; Sunny Naoshekpam; Uma Takhellambam	Golden Pictures	
14 December 2021	4/11	Ajit Yumnam	Khekhe Leihaothabam; Gautam; Wangthoi; Naobi Salam; Kamcha	Skyline Pictures	
14 December 2021	Eikhoigi Yum	Romi Meitei	Ningthoujam Priyojit; Sorri Senjam; Bhumeshore; Nganthoibi Ningthoujam	Thangarakpa Living Frames	
14 December 2021	Awaiba Mapu	Khoibam Homeshwori	Bonium Thokchom; Sonia Samjetsabam	Home Films	
15 December 2021	Dewan Kanano	Surjakanta	Kaiku Rajkumar; Kripalaxmi Gurumayum; Leishangthem Rahul	Ereicha Film	
15 December 2021	Happugi Mondrang	Ojitbabu Ningthoujam	Silheiba Ningthoujam; Soma Laishram; Nicky Sorokhaibam; Avi Khundrakpam	Vision Films	
16 December 2021	Nungshi Lottery Phaorehe	O. Gautam	Silheiba Ningthoujam; Dolly Gurumayum; Kripalaxmi Gurumayum; Prasanta Oinam	Mashu Maben Films	
23 December 2021	Meet-Yengee Wangmadasu	Suvas E.	Nandakumar Nongmaithem; Gurumayum Bonny; Chingtham Sarmila; Ningthoukhongjam Bobo	Rajkumari Kamalasana Films	
28 December 2021	Nongallamdaisida	O. Gautam	Hamom Sadananda; Gurumayum Bonny; Mukabala; Biju Ningombam; Manganba; Moirangthem Roshni	NB Poireicha Films	
28 December 2021	Apaiba Leichil	Bobby Wahengbam	Bishesh Huirem; Arun Yumnam; Naoba	Third Eye	
