= Spaced Out - Panthung Di Kadaaida! =

Indian Meitei language non-feature narrative fiction film

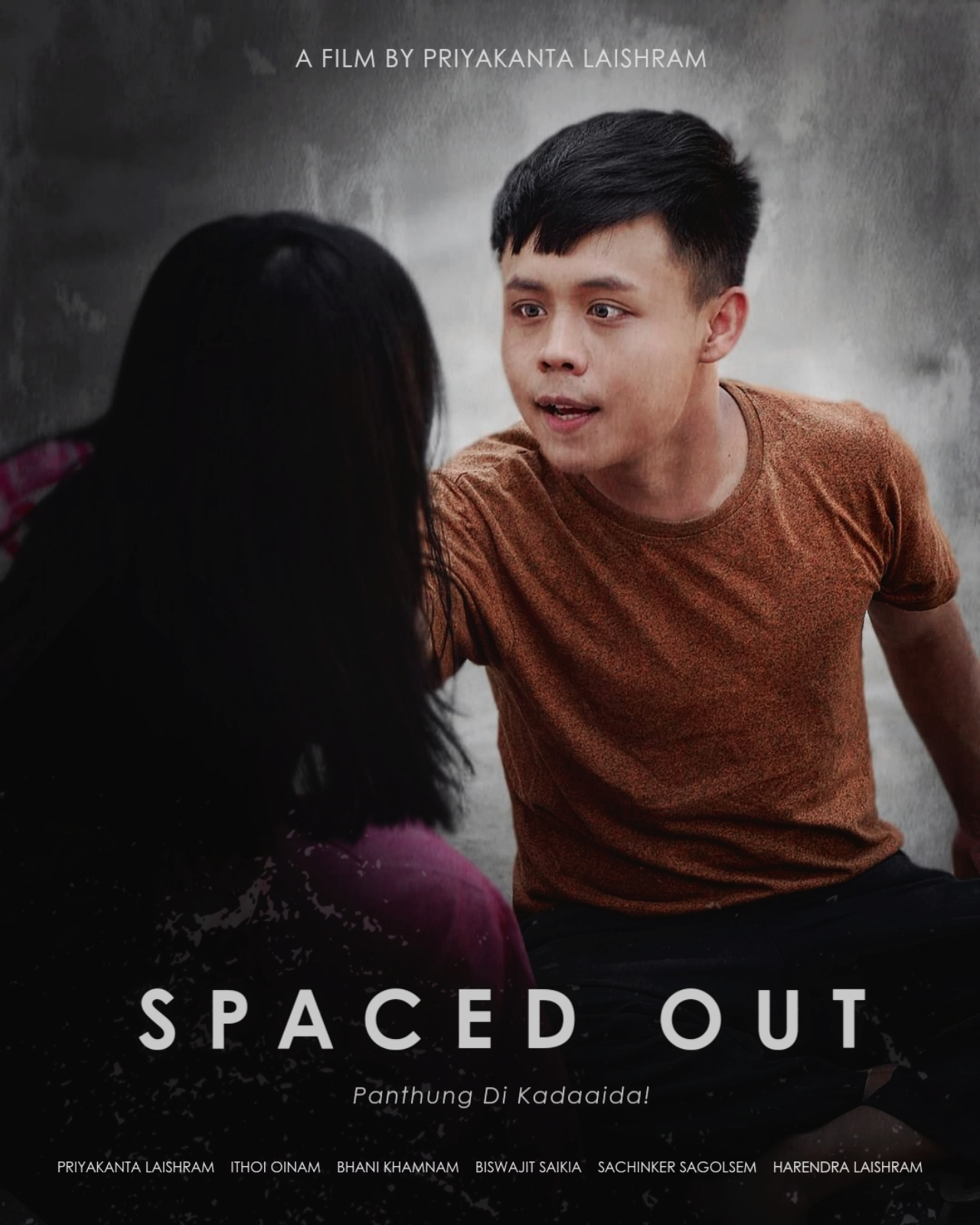
- Poster
- Directed by: Priyakanta Laishram
- Written by: Priyakanta Laishram
- Produced by: Caroline Laishram
- Starring: Priyakanta Laishram; Ithoi Oinam; Biswajit Saikia; Bhani Khamnam; Sachinker Sagolsem
- Cinematography: Jackson Naoroibam
- Edited by: Priyakanta Laishram
- Music by: Whitesand Music; Amal Raj; Sorri Senjam
- Production company: Priyakanta Productions
- Release date: 1 June 2021
- Country: India
- Language: Meiteilon (Manipuri)

Spaced Out - Panthung Di Kadaaida! is a 2021 Indian Meitei language non-feature narrative fiction film written, directed, and edited by Priyakanta Laishram. Produced by Caroline Laishram under the banner of Priyakanta Productions, the film centers on a teenager named Panthoi and explores the emotional and social consequences of drug addiction. The film features an ensemble cast including Priyakanta Laishram, Ithoi Oinam, Sachinker Sagolsem, and Biswajit Saikia. The film was released on YouTube on 1 June 2021 and received over 500,000 views within 48 hours, the first for any film from Northeast India. It is also the first film from the region to be dubbed in Punjabi and Haryanvi languages.

Laishram won the Best Actor award at the Human Rights and Social Issues Film Festival 2019 in Tokyo, and the film received several other accolades.

== Plot ==
Panthoi Sagolsem (Priyakanta Laishram) is a young man confronting the emotional and physical aftermath of prolonged drug addiction. Although he has entered rehabilitation, he continues to struggle with fractured relationships, personal loss, and years of wasted potential. The narrative unfolds through Panthoi recounting his life story to fellow patients at a rehabilitation centre. Panthoi is the only son in his family, living with his father and elder sister Leima (Bhani Khamnam). His mother died when he was four, and he grew up as the primary hope of the household. As a child and adolescent, Panthoi shows promise, but as he grows older he becomes influenced by peer groups and is introduced to drugs. Alongside his friend Ngaanba (Sachinker Sagolsem), who is also addicted, Panthoi experiments with various substances, including cocaine, tablets, and methamphetamine, gradually developing a dependency.

As his addiction deepens, Panthoi withdraws from his family, abandons his education, and becomes increasingly unreliable. His romantic relationship with Laaija (Ithoi Oinam) deteriorates due to his neglect, emotional absence, and repeated relapses. His childhood friend Lanchenba (Biswajit Saikia) remains concerned and supportive but is repeatedly pushed away as Panthoi's self-destructive behavior escalates. Panthoi cycles in and out of rehabilitation centres, each attempt undermined by relapse and experimentation with new drugs. Shortly after leaving rehab, Panthoi and Ngaanba are caught using drugs near the courtyard of Panthoi's house by Leima. The confrontation escalates into an argument and physical altercation, leaving Leima injured with a bleeding forehead. Intoxicated, Panthoi and Ngaanba flee the scene. Later, Panthoi is dropped off at a secluded location, where he experiences intense flashbacks of his family's suffering, his conflicts with his sister, and the breakdown of his relationship with Laaija.

Panthoi later goes to Lanchenba's home. As he reaches the gate, he sees Lanchenba sitting affectionately with his sister, triggering memories of how addiction damaged Panthoi's own relationships. Despite their history, Lanchenba welcomes him warmly. During their conversation, Panthoi admits that he understands the harm he has caused but no longer knows how to escape his situation. He confesses that he left his sister injured, prompting Lanchenba to immediately leave to check on Leima while asking Panthoi to stay the night. Alone at Lanchenba's house, Panthoi observes the bond between Lanchenba and his sister, which intensifies his self-reflection. Overwhelmed, he leaves without eating and returns home late at night. There, he sees his father tending to Leima's injury and overhears a painful conversation about his life and wellbeing. Confronted by the consequences of his actions, Panthoi breaks down, crying for help and begging his family for forgiveness.

Panthoi then attempts to rebuild his life and maintain sobriety. The process proves physically and emotionally severe, marked by withdrawal episodes that nearly cost him his life. He is also beaten by drug dealers from whom he had taken drugs without paying. During this period, Ngaanba dies from a drug overdose after collapsing in a muddy field. Panthoi learns of his friend's death only after Lanchenba informs him, leaving him devastated. As Panthoi continues his recovery, he becomes aware of the time he has lost. He sees former classmates completing their degrees and moving forward while he must start again from the beginning. Struggling with regret and isolation, he asks Lanchenba to arrange a meeting with Laaija in an attempt to reconcile. Laaija agrees to meet him. Panthoi apologizes and asks for forgiveness, expressing his desire to rebuild their relationship. Laaija says she is glad to see him improving and admits she waited for him for years despite being ignored. While assuring Panthoi that she still cares for him and is willing to support his recovery, she makes it clear that their romantic relationship has ended. She leaves the meeting in tears, urging him to become a better person.

In the final moments, Panthoi reflects through a voiceover on the love and patience shown to him despite his failures, his uncertainty about the future, and his ongoing struggle with addiction. He describes his condition as an illness he continues to battle while holding onto the hope of repaying the love and kindness he has received. The film ends with Panthoi sitting barefoot outside his home, leaning against a wall and attempting to eat lunch. His hands tremble as he loses control and collapses to the ground, crying uncontrollably as the food spills from his plate. His sister Leima silently kneels behind him, sharing the moment without words. Panthoi's recovery remains unresolved as the film concludes.

== Cast ==
- Priyakanta Laishram as Panthoi Sagolshem
- Ithoi Oinam as Laaija
- Bhani Khamnam as Leima
- Sachinker Sagolsem as Ngaanba
- Biswajit Saikia as Lanchenba
- Harendra Laishram as Panthoi's father
- Ramva Leishangthem as Chanu
- Diana Vaiphei as Lingjel
- Galaxy Khundongbam as Panthoi (young)
- Tania Laishram as Leima (young)
- Yaiphabi Toijam as a college student
- Ratanmala Laishram as a college student
- Shally Heigrujam as a college student
- Nongpoknganba Khoirom as a college student
- Nurjit Konsam as a rehab patient
- Mocha Laishram as a rehab patient
- Raina Rajkumari as a rehab patient
- Deepika Mayanglambam as a rehab patient
- Henry Nongmaithem as a college student

== Production ==
Principal photography for the film began on 11 May 2019 and was completed in a 10-day schedule. An initial cut was screened at a film festival later that year. Plans to extend the film's runtime were delayed due to the COVID-19 pandemic. Additional scenes were filmed intermittently during India's lockdowns in 2020 and 2021 at locations in and around Imphal and Chandigarh. The final extended shooting schedule was completed in April 2021.

The film was released on 1 June 2021 on YouTube via Priyakanta Laishram's official channel, where it received over 500,000 views within 48 hours, setting a record for a film from Northeast India. The English and Punjabi subtitled version of the film was screened in Punjab and Chandigarh on 26 June 2025, in observance of the International Day Against Drug Abuse and Illicit Trafficking.

It is also the first Manipuri film to be dubbed in Punjabi and Haryanvi. According to India Today, "the film is based in Manipur, but the problem it discusses isn’t limited to one location. If it can initiate conversations elsewhere, that's something."

== Soundtrack ==
The background score of the film was composed by Whitesand Music and Amal Raj. The film also features two original songs, Panthung Di Kadaaida! and Maibemma, which are listed below.

No.	Title	Lyrics	Music	Length
1.	"Panthung Di Kadaaida!"	Priyakanta Laishram	Bhani Khamnam	04:51
2.	"Maibemma"	Bandana Maisnam	Sorri Senjam	04:02
Total length:				08:52

== Accolades ==
Award	Category	Winner's name	Result	Ref.
Human Rights and Social Issues Film Festival 2019, Tokyo	Best Actor in a Leading Role	Priyakanta Laishram	Won	
Human Rights and Social Issues Film Festival 2019, Tokyo	Best Supporting Actor (Male)	Sachinker Sagolsem	Nominated	
Human Rights and Social Issues Film Festival 2019, Tokyo	Best Supporting Actor (Female)	Bhani Khamnam	Nominated	
Short & Non-Feature Motion Pictures Wave Festival 2020–2021, Delhi	Best Actor in Drama	Priyakanta Laishram	Won	
Short & Non-Feature Motion Pictures Wave Festival 2020–2021, Delhi	Best Screenplay	Priyakanta Laishram	Won	
Short & Non-Feature Motion Pictures Wave Festival 2020–2021, Delhi	Best Picture in Other Social Issues	Priyakanta laishram	Nominated	

== Reception ==
In its review, The Sangai Express called Spaced Out - Panthung Di Kadaaida! a powerful exploration of addiction, commending its authenticity and emotional impact, though it suggested the narrative felt rushed due to its brief runtime. Imphal Review of Arts and Politics described the film as "a poetic, tragic, and necessary film" that approaches teen addiction "as a human crisis" rooted in pain, erasure and emotional collapse."

The Frontier Manipur described the film as a "meditation on memory and the difficulty of reconciling the happiness of the past with the present that's become too sad to bear," praising its unvarnished depiction of addiction's cycles and the emotional toll on both the protagonist and his family. The review by Signpost noted that the film provides a slow-burning, powerful exploration of a teenager's mental and emotional challenges amid substance abuse.

== See also ==
- Oneness (film)
- The Foul Truth
- It's Not My Choice
