= Ithoi Oinam =

Indian actress from Manipur

- Born: Ithoi Oinam; 29 October; Pishumthong Oinam Leikai, Manipur, India
- Occupation: Actress
- Parent(s): Oinam Sanou; Oinam Ongbi Sushila

Ithoi Oinam is an Indian film actress who appears in Manipuri films. She made her lead debut as a child actor in Chan-Thoibi (2009), a film shot on a Nokia N70 and created entirely by children under 12. Since 2014, she has transitioned to prominent roles in mainstream Manipuri cinema and has received two Best Actor in a Leading Role – Female awards, one each from the Manipur State Film Awards and the MANIFA.

She is best known for her roles in films like Amukta Ani, It's Not My Choice, Larei Lathup, Tharoi Ahambei Mahao, Eigi Nupi Tamnalai, Spaced Out - Panthung Di Kadaaida!, and Nongmei Paiba Rapist.

== Career ==
Born into a filmmaking family, Ithoi Oinam made her early screen appearances at the age of 3–4 in films directed by her father, the late Oinam Sanou. Her debut role as a child actor came with Chan-Thoibi (2009), directed by Priyakanta Laishram, a film made entirely by children under the age of 12, in which she portrayed a stepmother.

Her transition from child artist to mature roles began with her appearance in the music video album Haakhinu Thamoi (2014), followed by supporting roles in films such as Amukta Ani, Sira Shi Changa Chang, Mr. Khadang, Nungshi Feijei, and Eikhoi Pabunggi.

Ithoi gained recognition for her role in It's Not My Choice (2015), directed by Priyakanta Laishram, where she starred alongside Bishesh Huirem as an LGBTQ ally. The film, acclaimed both in India and abroad, was notably adapted into Thai in 2024, the first Indian short film to receive such an adaptation, and the first short film from Northeast India to surpass one million views on YouTube. Her portrayal of the character Ayeengbi in the film received critical acclaim.

She went on to star in several popular feature films, including Satlo Leirang Satlo, Hoo Sangom, Larei Lathup, Eigi Nupi Tamnalai, and Khomlang Laman further establishing herself as a leading actress in Manipuri cinema.

In 2021, Ithoi portrayed the character Laaija in the non-feature film Spaced Out - Panthung Di Kadaaida!, directed by Priyakanta Laishram. Her performance as a young woman who remains steadfast in her principles despite romantic challenges received positive reviews from critics. The Sangai Express praised Ithoi's performance as Laaija in the film, highlighting her portrayal as a powerful depiction of self-preservation and personal strength.The Signpost News described her performance in the film as “one of her most mature and layered performances—measured, dignified, and emotionally honest.”

In 2022, Ithoi received recognition for her work in film, winning the Best Actress in a Lead Role award at the SSS MANIFA 2023 for her performance in Nongmei Paiba Rapist, directed by Robita Leima. She also received the Best Actor (Female) award at the 15th Manipur State Film Awards 2023 for her role in Tharoi Ahambei Mahao, directed by Khoibam Homeshwori.

She was nominated for Best Actor Female Northeast at the Prag Cine Awards 2025 for her role as Thaballeima in the 2024 film Yahouthengba Khoimu.

== Accolades ==
Award	Category	Film	Result	Ref.
15th Manipur State Film Awards 2023	Best Actor in a Leading Role - Female	Tharoi Ahambei Mahao	Won	
11th MANIFA 2023	Best Actor in a Leading Role - Female	Nongmei Paiba Rapist	Won	
Prag Cine Awards Northeast 2025	Best Actor in a Leading Role - Female	Yahouthengba Khoimu	Nominated	

== Selected filmography ==
Year	Title	Role	Director	Ref.
2014	Amukta Ani	Laisna	Romi Meitei	
2015	It's Not My Choice	Ayeengbi	Priyakanta Laishram	
2015	Nungshi Feijei	Thoi	Chou En Lai	
2016	Henna Nungaijei	Ithoi	Kepidas	
2016	Eikhoi Pabunggi	Teenager	Hemanta Khuman	
2017	Nungshi Feijei 2	Thoi	Chou En Lai	
2017	Mr. Khadang	Langlen	Chou En Lai	
2018	Sanagi Nga	Manglembi	Romi Meitei	
2019	Mutlamdai Thaomei	Amina	Sudhir Kangjam	
2019	Wakchingi Len	Manithoiba's sister	Bijgupta Laishram	
2021	Satlo Leirang Satlo	Thambal	Ojitbabu Ningthoujam	
2021	Larei Lathup	Leirang	Ojitbabu Ningthoujam	
2021	Spaced Out - Panthung Di Kadaaida!	Laaija	Priyakanta Laishram	
2022	Tharoi Ahambei Mahao	Nganthoi	Khoibam Homeshwori	
2022	Nongmei Paiba Rapist	Lamjingbi's mother	Robita Leima	
2022	Thamoigee Makhol	Linthoi	Bimol Phibou	
2022	Hoo Sangom	Thariktha	Ojitbabu Ningthoujam	
2023	Sajibugee Leihao	Kebi	Bijgupta Laishram	
2023	Ashengba Eral	Tarubi	OC Meira	
2024	Eigi Nupi Tamnalai	Punshi	Ojitbabu Ningthoujam	
2024	Khomlang Laman	Sanathoi	OC Meira	
2024	Thambal Leikhok	Thambalsana	Khoibam Homeshwori	
2025	Yahouthengba Khoimu	Thaballeima	Rakesh Naorem	
2025	Cheina	Ningthibee	Geet Yumnam	
2025	Nangbu Nungshiduna Hinglibani	Maloti	Khoibam Homeshwori	
2025	Yotki Thamoi	Tanoubi	Ojitbabu Ningthoujam	
2025	Wari Loidri	Linthoi	Ojitbabu Ningthoujam	
2025	Nupadi Sanani?	Nongthangleima	A. Robita Leima	
2025	Nungshithoi Eigee Thoi	Thoi	BB Surjit	
2026	Sana Talloi		Khoibam Homeshwori	
Upcoming	Aroiba Wayel		Binoranjan Oinam	
Upcoming	Thamoigi Pourol		Geet Yumnam	
Upcoming	Game Over		Dalom Gurumayum	
Upcoming	Singjamei Ningol		Paari Luwang	
Upcoming	Loktak Paatki Lily		I.S. Gurung	
