= Who Said Boys Can't Wear Makeup? =

2018 Indian (Manipuri) Film

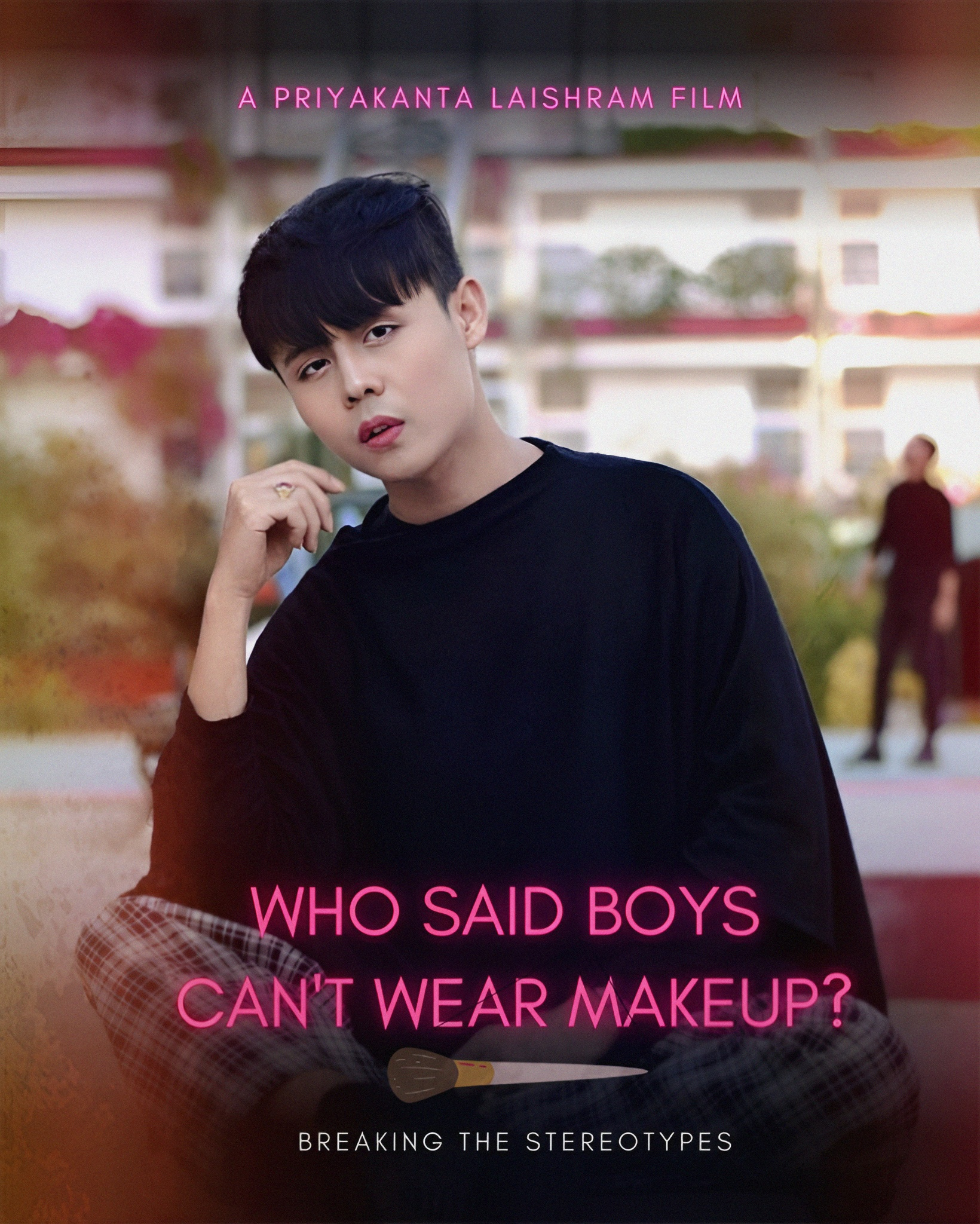
- Directed by: Priyakanta Laishram
- Produced by: Priyakanta Laishram
- Starring: Priyakanta Laishram; Bala Hijam; Nimrit Kaur Ahluwalia; Thounaojam Strela Luwang; Inder Bajwa
- Cinematography: Sachit Gurung; Bryan Marshall
- Music by: Isaac
- Release date: 7 April 2018
- Running time: 24 minutes
- Country: India
- Languages: English; Meitei language (officially called Manipuri language)

Who Said Boys Can't Wear Makeup? is a 2018 English-Manipuri film written, produced and directed by Priyakanta Laishram under the banner, Priyakanta Productions. It is the first Indian film to discuss the subject of men's makeup and gender-neutral fashion. The film stars Laishram, Inder Bajwa, Thounaojam Strela Luwang, Nimrit Kaur Ahluwalia and Bala Hijam. At the Lifestyle Young Influencer Awards 2018, the film won the Best Multimedia Influencer Award. The film was premiered at St. Regis, Mumbai on 7 April 2018.

== Cast ==
- Priyakanta Laishram
- Inder Bajwa
- Bala Hijam
- Nimrit Kaur Ahluwalia
- Thounaojam Strela Luwang
- Rajkumari Linthoisana
- John Oinam

== Production ==
=== Development ===
In an interview with Scroll.in, Priyakanta Laishram said that the film was inspired by his own experiences as a boy who wears makeup and gender-neutral clothing, as well as the prejudice, mistreatment, and disparaging remarks he encountered.

In The Indian Express, Laishram stated that it was through his films that he began to accept himself, after having struggled with bullying and discrimination in school and college for his penchant for wearing makeup.

=== Filming ===
The film's principal photography started on 29 January 2018. The majority of the movie was filmed in Bangalore's Garden City University and Mumbai. The film wrapped up its shoot on 5 February 2018. Inder Bajwa, a former top model in India, said of working on the movie, "It is an incredibly sensible and essential initiative".

=== Post-production and release ===
Who Said Boys Can't Wear Makeup? was edited by Priyakanta Laishram and the music was composed by Isaac. The film had its premiere on 7 April 2018 at St. Regis in Mumbai, and in Imphal on 11 May 2018. The film was later released on YouTube on 28 October 2018 for online streaming.

== Reception ==
Upon release, the film received critical acclaim for its theme and narrative. The Sangai Express wrote, "Who Said Boys Can't Wear Makeup: A film way ahead of its time".

Signpost News wrote, "Who Said Boys Can't Wear Makeup? succeeds in conveying its intended message in a very slick and straightforward narrative style that writer and director Priyakanta Laishram had adopted. The film has the power to make anyone reevaluate every small error and slur we make inadvertently when speaking to others daily without giving it a second thought".

Imphal Times wrote, "Who Said Boys Can't Wear Makeup is no less than a revolution".
