= Nungshi Feijei =

- Theatrical release poster
- Directed by: Chou En Lai
- Screenplay by: Chaiba
- Story by: Nanao
- Produced by: Rb Atom
- Starring: Gurumayum Bonny; Khaba; Mukabala (Loya) Maibam; Soma Laishram; Biju Ningombam; Ithoi Oinam
- Cinematography: Jiten, Joykishan
- Edited by: Joykishan
- Music by: Bishow Ch.
- Production company: Dreams Entertainment
- Distributed by: Dreams Entertainment
- Release date: 7 December 2015
- Running time: 155 minutes
- Country: India
- Language: Meiteilon (Manipuri)

Nungshi Feijei (English: Romantic Wrong Turn) is a 2015 Manipuri film directed by Chou En Lai and produced by Ab Atom. The film features Gurumayum Bonny, Khaba, Mukabala Maibam, Soma Laishram, Biju Ningombam and Ithoi Oinam in the lead roles. The story of the film was written by Nanao and screenplay by Chaiba. The film is a remake of the 2013 Tollywood (Telugu) film Gunde Jaari Gallanthayyinde. It was released at Bhagyachandra Open Air Theatre (BOAT), Imphal, on 7 December 2015. A sequel to the film titled Nungshi Feijei 2 was released in October 2016.

== Cast ==
- Gurumayum Bonny as Meiraba
- Khaba as Naoba
- Mukabala Maibam as Chaoren
- Soma Laishram as Nungshibi
- Biju Ningombam as Mangalleima
- Ithoi Oinam as Thoi
- Thokchom Priya as Thoi's mother
- Idhou as Chaoren's boss
- Huirem Manglem as Mangalleima's father
- Thokchom Ibomcha as Ningthou
- Phulka as Chaoren's aunty
- Chaiba

== Production ==
The production house, Dreams Entertainment, has also produced films which are among the hits. Among them, Bonny-Artina starrer Mongpham and Bonny-Sushmita-Artina starrer Nungshibase Phagi Natte may be mentioned. The blessing ceremony (yaipha thouni thouram) was held on 4 May 2015. The film is presented by ISTV Network and Poknapham.

== Soundtrack ==
Bishow Ch. composed the soundtrack for the film and Paresh Laishram and Kenedy Laishram wrote the lyrics. The songs are titled Machoi Machoi Eigi Waheina and Chamlaba Thamoido Utlammu Eingonda.

Nungshi Feijei

Soundtrack album by Bishow Ch. Surma Chanu Khaba
- Genre: Feature film soundtrack
- Length: 8:15
- Label: Dreams Entertainment

No.	Title	Lyrics	Music	Singer(s)	Length
1.	"Machoi Machoi Eigi Waheina"	Paresh Laishram	Bishow Ch.	Bishow Ch., Surma Chanu	04:04
2.	"Chamlaba Thamoido Utlammu Eingonda"	Kenedy Laishram	Bishow Ch.	Khaba, Surma Chanu	04:11
Total length:					8:15
