= Bishesh Huirem =

Indian actress and model

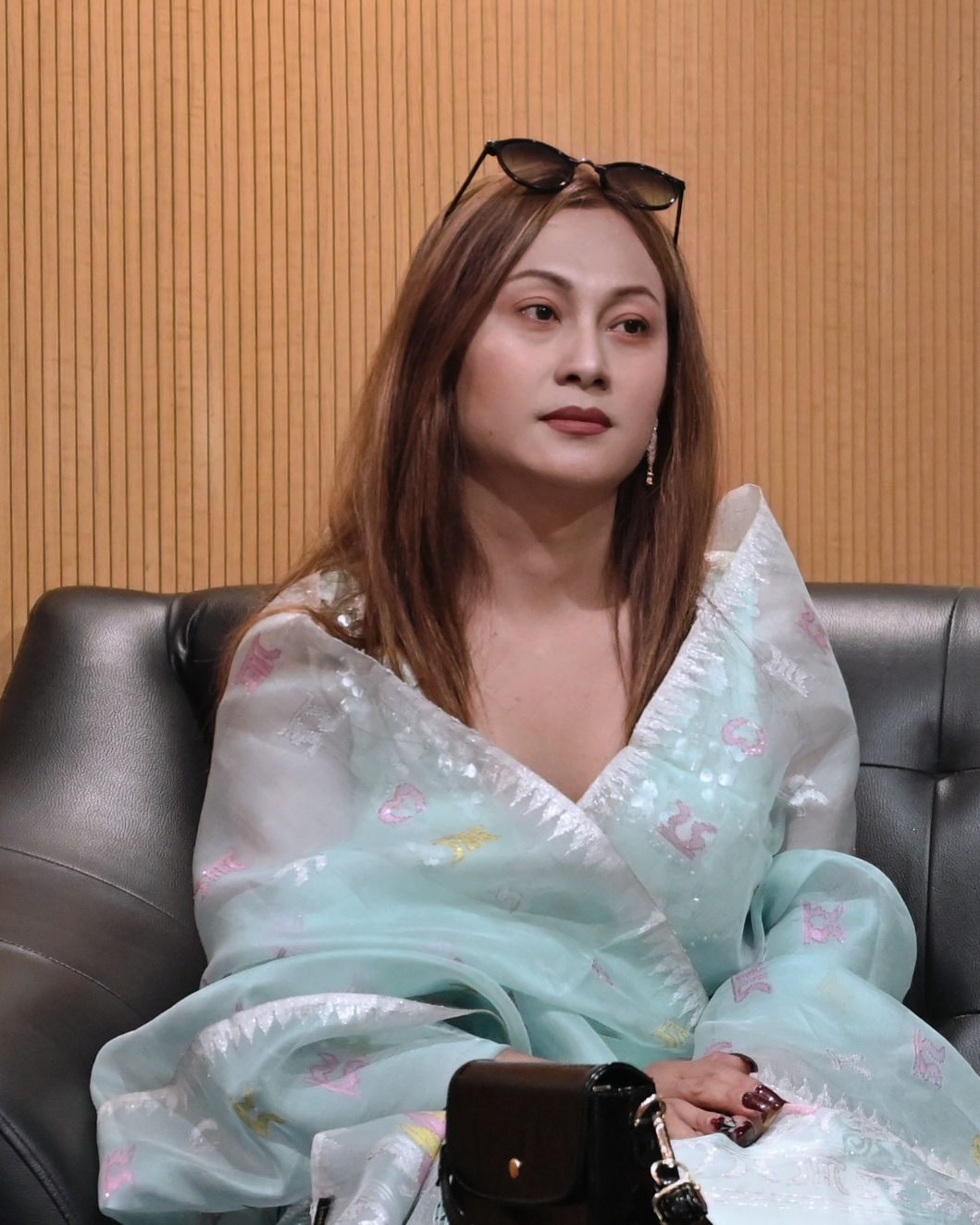
- Bishesh Huirem at the trailer launch of Oneness
- Born: Imphal, Manipur
- Occupations: actor, costume designer, fashion designer, model, salonnière
- Known for: first Indian transgender to represent her country in international beauty pageant; first Indian transgender to be appointed as a state icon in parliamentary elections; first Manipuri transgender to win Best Actor Award
- Parents: Manglem Huirem (father); Khomdonbi Huirem (mother)

Bishesh Huirem is an Indian actress and model from the Meitei ethnicity of Manipur. She is best known for being the first Indian to represent India at the Miss International Queen for Transgender 2016 organised in Pattaya, Thailand. She is the first Indian transgender to be appointed as a state icon for the parliamentary polls in the Lok Sabha elections. She is the first transgender to win the "Best Actor Award" in the 14th Manipur State Film Awards, 2022. It's Not My Choice directed by Priyakanta Laishram, and Apaiba Leichil directed by Bobby Wahengbam are some of her notable films.

== Film career ==
Bishesh Huirem started her career in Shumang Kumhei, a popular theater form of Manipur. Later, she debuted in Manipuri films with 2012 Manipuri feature film Ang Tamo, alongside Kaiku Rajkumar.

In 2015, she starred in It's Not My Choice, written and directed by Priyakanta Laishram. The critics praised her performance, describing it as the best of her career. The Sangai Express wrote, "Bishesh Huirem, the protagonist, delivers her career's finest performance in this film. Despite her extensive experience in Sumaang Kumhei plays and two feature films, her portrayal of teenager Sanathoi is truly exceptional. Unlike her other movies, where she tends to go overboard, she flawlessly captures the emotions in the most genuine way in this film." She received Special Jury Mention Award for her performance at the 2015 Highland Independent Film Festival in Shimla, and Honourable Mention at the 2017 Riverdale International Short Film Festival. The film became the first Indian film to be adapted into Thai and the first short film from Northeast India to surpass one million views on YouTube.

In 2022, she won Best Actor Award at 14th Manipur State Film Awards 2022 for the film Apaiba Leichil, becoming the first transgender actor to win the title. She also won Special Jury Award at 5th Sailadhar Baruah Film Awards (NE) 2022.

== 2016 Apology Demand Incident ==
On 13 September 2016, Bishesh Huirem was allegedly beaten up by the personal security guards and armed personnel of Rural Development Minister Moirangthem Okendra in Imphal, Manipur. The incident happened in a road rage at around 10 pm during night. Consequently, Bishesh protested and served an ultimatum to Minister Okendra to apologize for the incident within seven days or face outcomes. However, the officials of the Minister rejected her claim over the incident. According to them, Bishesh was driving "dead drunk" and was even not able to reverse her car which was blocking the minister's security escorts. Further, the minister's officials said that Bishesh was throwing tantrums claiming she had the right to drive and even attempted to forcibly open the minister's vehicle's door. In response, Bishesh denied all the claims from the minister's officials as "baseless charges". She denied she was drunk. She clarified that she was not even consuming salt and oil in her diet for her hormone therapy in a preparation for a beauty contest. Shocked by the incident, she was hospitalized. The associations and organizations of various artistes banned all mobile theatres, films and music programmes in the Heirok Assembly constituency (Minister Okendra's associated Constituency) until and unless he apologized.

== Filmography ==
Year	Title	Director	Studio
2012	Ang Tamo	Pilu Heigrujam	Pilu Films
2015	It's Not My Choice	Priyakanta Laishram	Priyakanta Productions
2021	Apaiba Leichil	Bobby Wahengbam	Third Eye

== Selected Shumang Kumheis ==
- Border
- Restafen
- Pizza (2011)
- Nupigi Thamoi
- Chagee Khuji
- Eengengee Nini Panba (2011)
- Ishing Chaibi (2013)
- Inamma (2014)
- Tamphayai
- Kairaba Chaphu
- Kunti 4
- Maogi Ibai
- Mou Ahum Ningol Ama (2019)
- Nungshi Laman (2020)
- Online Da Luhongba (2021)
- Mutlaroidaba Machu (2022)
- Sanagi Thambal (2022)
- Leepun (2023)
- 3 May (2025)
- Anouba Lambi (2025)
- Thokpa Ngamdaba Kishi (2025)
- Ahanba Khongpham (2025–26)
