= Huirem =

Huirem is a Meitei family name. Notable people with the surname include:

- Huirem Seema (1970–2011), Indian actress
- Bishesh Huirem, Indian transgender actress and fashion model
