= Thounaojam Strela Luwang =

Indian model (born 2001)

- Meitei: /thou-nāu-jam strã-lā lū-wāng/
- Born: Strela; June 5, 2001 (age 25); Manipur, India
- Education: Manipal University Jaipur; Heritage Convent School, Manipur University (MIMS) Imphal
- Occupations: MBA Student: Model; actress; television anchor; Writer
- Height: 5’7
- Beauty pageant titleholder
- Title: Miss Manipur 2017; Femina Miss India Manipur 2023
- Years active: 2016-present
- Hair color: Black
- Eye color: Hazel Brown
- Major competitions: Miss Manipur 2017; (Winner); Mega Miss Northeast 2017 (Winner); Miss Paradise 2016; Miss Diva Northeast 2016-17; (Top 5); (Miss Rampwalk); Femina Miss India Manipur 2023; (Winner); Femina Miss India 2023; (2nd Runner-Up)

Thounaojam Strela Luwang (Meitei: /thou-nāu-jam strã-lā lū-wāng/) is an Indian television anchor, social activist, model and beauty pageant title holder who was crowned second runner up at Femina Miss India 2023. She represented her state Manipur at Femina Miss India 2023 after winning Femina Miss India Manipur 2023. She won Miss Manipur pageant held in 2017. She was also one of the top five finalists at the Miss Diva Northeast 2016-17. She was featured in 2018 educational film, Who Said Boys Can't Wear Makeup? directed by Priyakanta Laishram, which was the first-ever Indian film on gender-neutral fashion and men's make-up.

Other than her performances in beauty pageants, she works for the social activism in mental health issues with regard to gender equality as well as in "child-friendly" education system.

== Background ==
Thounaojam Strela Luwang (Meitei: ꯊꯧꯅꯥꯎꯖꯝ ꯁ꯭ꯇ꯭ꯔꯦꯂꯥ ꯂꯨꯋꯥꯡ) was born on 5 June 2001 to Thounaojam Ratan Luwangcha and Ashalata Chingsubam, and belongs to the Thounaojam (Meitei: ꯊꯧꯅꯥꯎꯖꯝ) family and the Luwang (Meitei: ꯂꯨꯋꯥꯡ) clan of Meitei ethnicity. She is the third child of three siblings. She is native to Uripok Bachaspati Leikai of Uripok town in Imphal, Manipur. Strela studied for International Business and worked for day and night to build up her future career with strong desire. She loves music, playing guitar, Kalimba, and Ukulele.

Thounaojam has had attacks of epilepsy and anxiety in her past, and was diagnosed with depression at an early age. At the age of 8-10, she found the art of writing. She took social activism for creating social awareness of mental health issues.

== Miss Manipur 2017 ==
In 2017, Thounaojam entered and won Miss Manipur 2017, at Bheigyachandra Open Air Theatre in Imphal on December 16, 2017. During the event, she expressed her desire to work for the safety of animals and old aged people.

== In Miss Diva Northeast ==
At Miss Diva Northeast 2016-17, Thounaojam was one of the top five finalists, and won the title of "Miss Rampwalk".

== Femina Miss India 2023 ==
In 2023, Thounaojam entered and won Femina Miss India Manipur 2023 and represented her home state Manipur at the Femina Miss India 2023. At the latter, she won two sub-titles, Colorbar Miss Glamorous Look and Trends Miss Style Icon.

Thounaojam faced financial problems regarding her preparations for the pageant. She didn't have enough money to buy expensive dresses to wear during the pageant, unlike other participants do. So, she had collected some second-hand clothes to be used during the event.

Regarding Femina Miss India 2023 being held in Manipur, after its decade long regular venue of Mumbai to another spot in Manipur, a remote state of Northeast India, for the first time in the history of the pageant, Luwang said the following:

The fact that the whole country is coming to my home, not only for the first time in its history but for the fact that I will also get to be a part of making that history, it just gives me immense happiness and excitement.

== Social activism ==
At school she was bullied by classmates, colleagues and even teachers. Therefore, Thounaojam has dedicated herself to encourage child-friendly education without the discrimination of any gender identity. Thounaojam quoted the following regarding her cause of social activism,

I have always been an active and avid messenger of Mental Health. Having felt what they feel, seen what they see, and feared what they fear, I must say my words would connect more to those suffering from mental health issues. Thus, I would want to work on advocating its causes that are prominent today and work on encouraging a child-friendly education, no more excessive pressure to the children and no more harsh punishments.

== Filmography ==
Year	Title	Role	Director	Note
2018	Who Said Boys Can't Wear Makeup?	Herself	Priyakanta Laishram	India's first film on gender-neutral fashion and men's makeup.
