= Priyakanta Laishram =

Indian actor, director

- Laishram in 2026
- Born: Priyakanta Thoi Laishram; 7 November 1998 (age 28); Imphal East, Manipur, India
- Education: University of Mumbai; Panjab University; Amity University, Noida
- Occupations: Actor, film director, film producer, writer, film editor
- Years active: 2009–present
- Height: 5 ft 8 in (173 cm)
- Parent(s): Harendra Laishram; Jibanlata Laishram
- Relatives: Caroline Laishram (sister)

Priyakanta Laishram (born 7 November 1998) is an Indian actor, film director, film producer, screenwriter, and film editor from the Meitei ethnicity of Imphal, Manipur who predominantly works in Manipuri films. Known for his socially relevant and unconventional films, he began making children's films at the age of 9 using a Nokia N70 mobile phone, receiving recognitions including The Youngest Filmmaker 2009 from Nokia and Manipur's Rising Star 2011 from Asian News International. His directorial work includes Oneness, notable for being Manipur’s first film centered on same-sex relationships. Laishram has won numerous accolades for his films, including a Manipur State Film Award and the Best Director Northeast award at the Prag Cine Awards.

Some of his notable works are Oneness, The Foul Truth, It's Not My Choice, Spaced Out - Panthung Di Kadaaida!, Who Said Boys Can't Wear Makeup?, I Am Special, and Up-Close With Priyakanta Laishram.

== Early life and education ==
He was born on 7 November 1998 in the Imphal East district of Manipur. His father Harendra Laishram is a Manipur Police Officer and his mother Jibanlata Laishram was an actress. His elder sister Caroline Laishram is a fashion designer.

After suffering from amyotrophic lateral sclerosis (ALS), his mother died in 2016. At the age of 16, he moved to Chandigarh to attend his senior secondary school. He then switched to Mumbai to pursue his bachelor's degree.

At Mumbai University, Laishram earned a bachelor of arts in mass media with a concentration in advertising. He also holds an honours degree in Sociology from Chandigarh's Panjab University. He completed his Master's degree in Journalism and Mass Communication with distinction from Amity University, Noida in 2024.

== Career ==
=== 2007–2011: Mobile phone filmmaking ===
Priyakanta Laishram started making short films when he was 9 years old by using a mobile phone, Nokia N70. Before making his children's films, he created and filmed stories using toys, an activity that marked his earliest experiments with filmmaking. At the age of 11, his first children's film, Lammuknarure was released in 2009.

Later that year, he directed two more children's films, Achumbadi Amarni, shot on a Nokia N70 and edited using the phone's built-in video editing software, and Chan-Thoibi, shot on a Sony Cyber-shot camera. He wrote, directed and edited all three films, which featured children from his neighbourhood, family and circle of friends. He received recognition as Manipur's Rising Star by Asian News International, The Youngest Filmmaker 2009 by Nokia, and Youth Icon 2009 by Mongba Hanba Magazine. His story was later featured by Reuters, bringing attention to his early filmmaking.

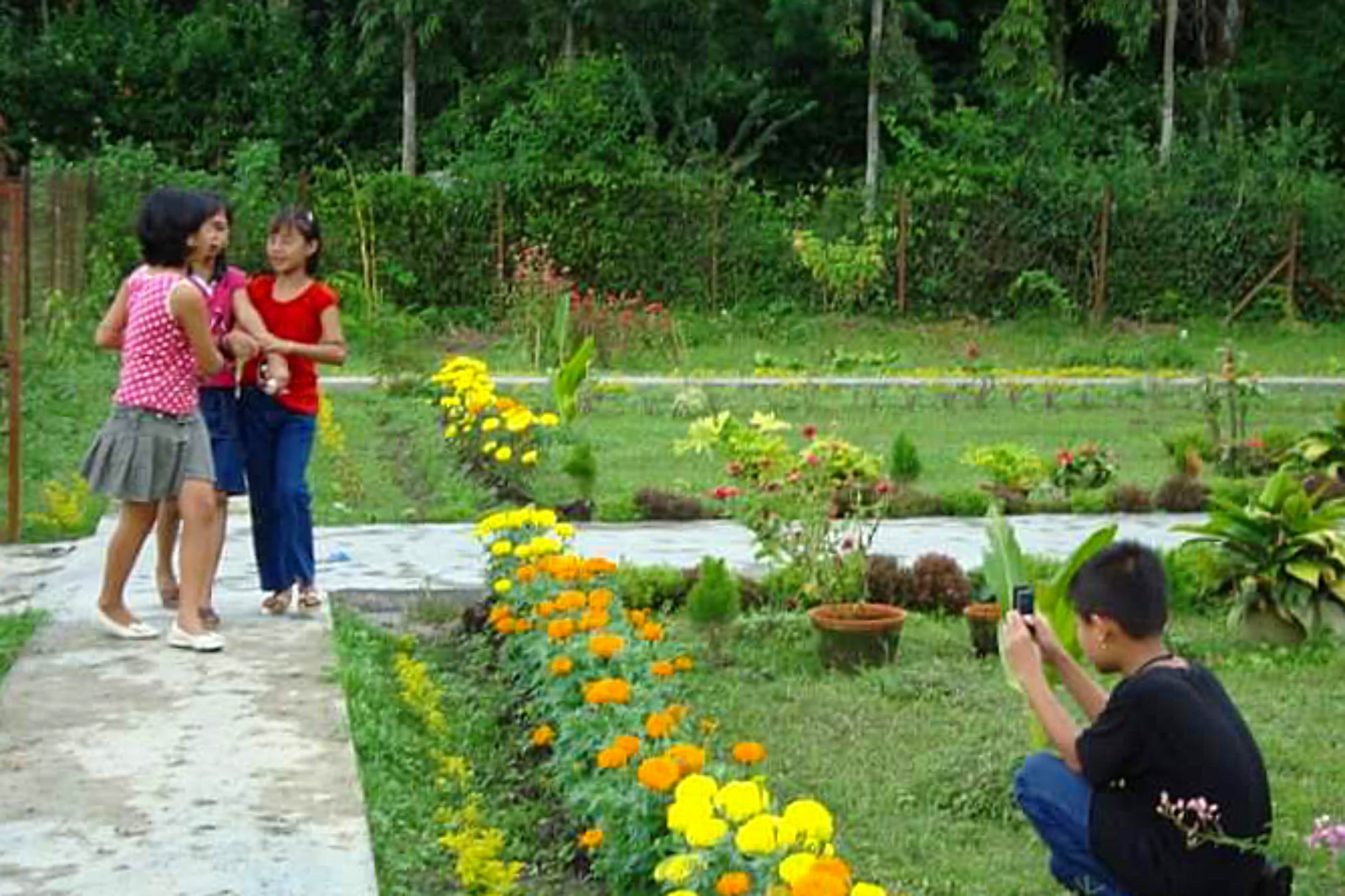
Laishram in 2007, at the age of 9 shooting his short film on Nokia N70.

=== 2015–Present: Socially relevant and unconventional short films ===
Laishram stated the following in an interview with Scroll.in on his transition from making films for children on mobile phones to social issue-based films:

"My film-making journey so far has had two phases. I was nine-years-old when I began making films with a Nokia N70 mobile phone. When I made those films, I was a child. Therefore, they had a stronger kid vibe. The second phase began after my senior secondary education. Sexual identity crisis, sexual harassment/abuse, mom's ALS diagnosis and her death, living by myself in Chandigarh and Mumbai, and dad's remarriage – many such life-altering events occurred between the first and second phases of my film-making journey, and I also discovered who I was.

Since the second stage of his career as a filmmaker, Laishram has gained recognition for drawing attention to social issues that are either shameful or taboo. His films are known for focusing on taboo subjects such as child abuse, male rape, LGBTQ issues, gender neutrality, and substance abuse.

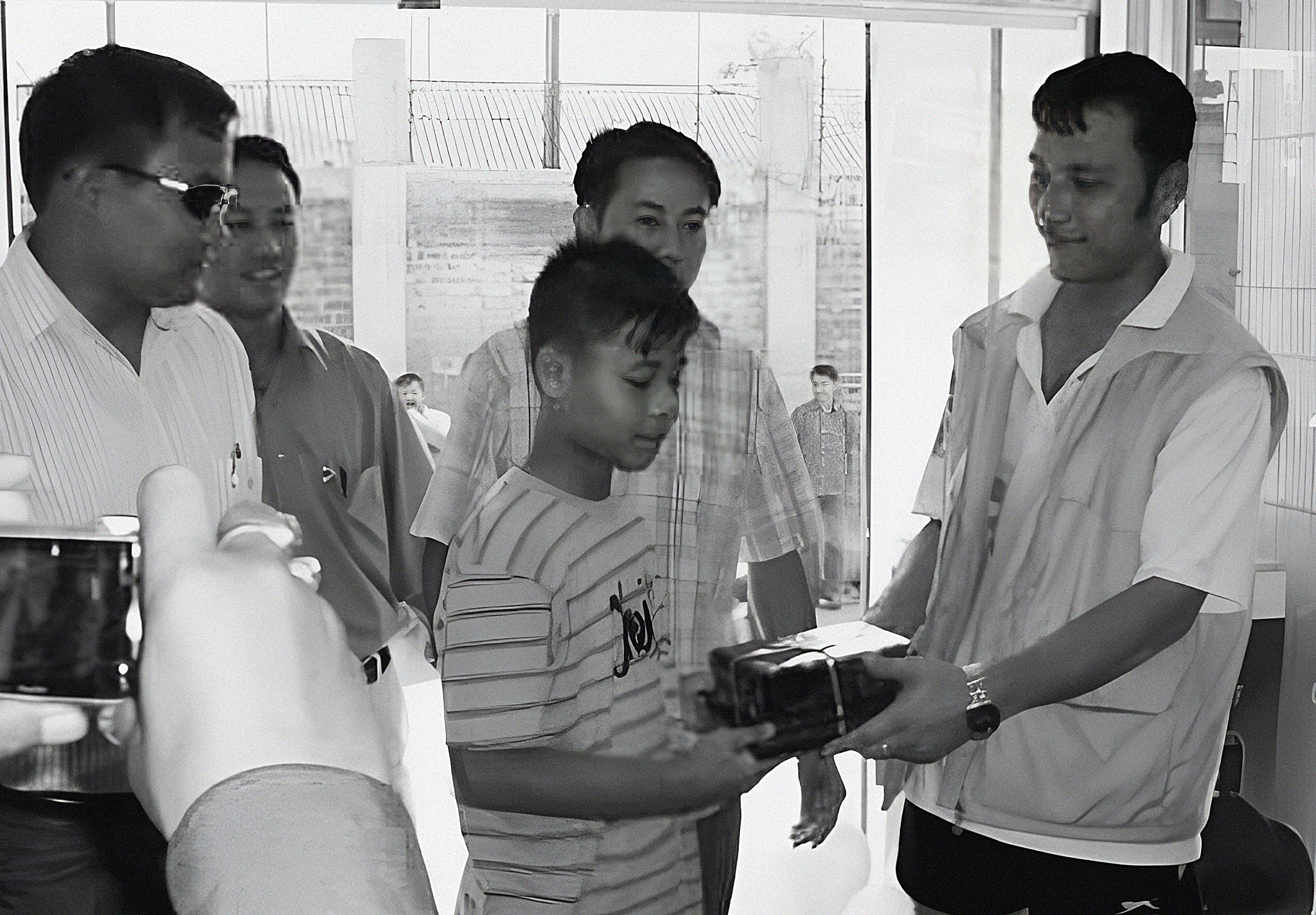
Laishram in 2009, at the age of 11 receiving a Nokia award from the then IPS Officer Thokchom Radheshyam.

In 2015, he wrote, edited, and directed the film It's Not My Choice, which stars Bishesh Huirem, the first Indian to represent India in Miss International Queen 2016, and depicts the story of a young transgender person named Sanathoi who is deprived of her basic rights. For the movie, Laishram was featured in Gaylaxy Magazine. The film received critical acclaim upon its premiere, with critics applauding Laishram's direction and writing in particular. The Sangai Express wrote, "Priyakanta Laishram's ability to maintain a straightforward and concise screenplay and dialogue without becoming didactic in conveying his intended message is truly praiseworthy. It is undeniable that he excels in his writing and directorial skills, as evidenced by his remarkable work in this film," while E-Pao cited the film as "One of the most impactful films on transgender visibility". Laishram won Best Film On Social Cause at the Highland Independent Film Festival 2015, Best Story and Best Filmmaker For A Cause at the Jalandhar Short Film Festival 2015.

In 2017, he wrote, edited, and directed I Am Special, a documentary-fiction film about disabled individuals. The film comprises six segments and draws on two real-life narratives, including that of his mother, who had amyotrophic lateral sclerosis (ALS), along with four fictionalised stories. I Am Special is the first English-language docufiction film made by a Manipuri. He received the Out of the Box Award at the Symbiosis Allied Media Awards for the film in 2018. Poknapham reviewed the film positively, noting that the film treats disability as a lived condition shaped by social attitudes, access, and everyday experience, with clarity and care.

Later in the year, he featured in the Kangana Ranaut starrer The Bollywood Diva, a music video produced by All India Bakchod and directed by Tanmay Bhat.

His 2018 movie Who Said Boys Can't Wear Makeup? was the first Indian film to deal with gender neutral fashion and men's make-up, for which he won Best Multimedia Influencer Award at the Lifestyle Young Influencer Awards 2018 in Mumbai. The film was premiered at St. Regis, Mumbai in 2018. Apart from boys and men who wear make-up and gender neutral clothes in real life, Inder Bajwa (Former Top Model), Thounaojam Strela Luwang, Bala Hijam, Nimrit Kaur Ahluwalia, Peden Ongmu Namgyal (Miss Diva Supranational 2017) and other renowned faces were also featured in the film. Upon release, the film received positive response.

His next movie was The Foul Truth in 2019. The film was about a boy who is a survivor of male rape and child sexual abuse. The film was also known for being the first film from Northeast India to accentuate the hidden truth about male rape. Laishram played the role of a sexual assault survivor in the movie, which earned him critical acclaim for his performance. The film received rave reviews for its theme, direction, dialogue and performances. For his portrayal of a sexual assault survivor, Laishram received acting recognition at several film festivals between 2018 and 2019, with the film also receiving awards in categories including social issues and technical achievements such as screenplay and sound design, acknowledging his contributions as a director, producer, writer, and sound designer. The film was screened at 33 international film festivals. Praising Laishram's performance, The Sangai Express wrote, "He gives a solid performance as the sexual assault survivor 'Thoithoiba' and brilliantly brings out the nuances to deliver a compelling act. He succeeds in spreading his stamp all over the film".

In 2020, his talk-show Up-Close With Priyakanta Laishram was released on his YouTube channel and raises various social issues including those pertaining to progressive discussions around gender roles, patriarchy, and societal norms. Known for its fresh perspective, the show sparked widespread online debate, trolling, and criticism.

In 2021, his film Spaced Out - Panthung Di Kadaaida! based on the topic of teen drug abuse was released. The Frontier Manipur describes the film as a "meaningful" and unflinchingly honest look at teenage drug addiction, stating that it is "a harrowing film experience that will not be forgotten once the credits roll." The Sangai Express describes the film as a "poignant and powerful exploration of teenage substance abuse," while noting that its short runtime limits character development and narrative depth. For his portrayal of a teen drug abuser, Panthoi, Laishram won Best Actor in a Leading Role at the Human Rights & Social Issues Film Festival 2019, Tokyo. Additionally, he won Best Actor in Drama and Best Screenplay at the Short & Non-Feature Motion Pictures Wave Festival 2020-2021, Delhi.

=== 2024: Debut Feature Film ===
Laishram's 2024 debut feature film, Oneness, is the first Manipuri film to explore same-sex relationships. The movie is based on a tragic true story of a Manipuri gay youth. Alongside Priyakanta, the film stars Maya Choudhury, Suraj Ngashepam, and Sachinker Sagolsem in the lead roles. The film made its world premiere at the 2024 KASHISH Pride Film Festival, South Asia's largest queer film festival, in Mumbai on May 17, 2024, at Cinepolis. The Indian edition of Elle listed the film as one of the top eight, while Mid-Day named it one among the 10 films to watch at KASHISH 2024. The film was subsequently officially selected and screened at the 14th Bangalore Queer Film Festival and the 2nd Eikhoigi Imphal International Film Festival, along with several other film festivals.

Upon its release, the film received generally positive reviews across various aspects. FIPRESCI India, the Indian chapter of the International Federation of Film Critics, recognised the significance of Laishram's Oneness, noting its contribution to broadening representation in Manipuri cinema and its exploration of marginalised identities. It described the film as part of a wider shift towards a more inclusive portrayal of Manipuri society. The Imphal Review of Arts and Politics praised Priyakanta Laishram's emotionally raw performance, empathetic direction, restrained screenplay, and sound design in Oneness, calling it "a defiant cinematic stand against deep-rooted socio-cultural intolerance." The Sangai Express wrote, "Priyakanta Laishram is a meticulous filmmaker whose work on Oneness has set new standards in Manipuri cinema. Known for his dedication, smart work, and critical analysis, Priyakanta has brought a unique vision to this film. His portrayal of Ivan Martin, the film’s protagonist, stands out as the best performance among the entire cast." E-Pao described the film as "a masterclass in storytelling, acting, and filmmaking, helmed by Priyakanta Laishram’s vision and talent." It further stated, "Oneness is a bold, pioneering film that pushes the boundaries of Manipuri cinema". Screen Echoes Manipur included his portrayal of Ivan Martin among the "Best 8 Performances in Manipuri Cinema in the Last Decade."

At the Prag Cine Awards 2025, Priyakanta Laishram won Best Director Northeast, which also earned him nominations for Best Film Northeast and Best Actor Northeast. In the 17th edition of the Manipur State Film Awards in 2025, presented by the Government of Manipur and the Manipur State Film Development Society, Laishram was conferred with the Special Jury Award for the film. India Today NE stated that Oneness helped bring queer narratives from the margins into the mainstream following its recognition at the Manipur State Film Awards. He won the Best Film Editor Award at the 8th Sailadhar Baruah Film Awards in 2025, marking his first honour in the Best Editing category.

Laishram cited the following when discussing how his entire filmography has shown how he has grown up:

"All my films have witnessed how I have grown up. They have given me the voice I never had, the voice suppressed by the general public and the mainstream media, and they helped me to understand others and myself better. The responsibility I feel as a filmmaker today makes me more and more aware of the issues of society, who I am as a person, and what I need to do as a filmmaker."

== Public and off-screen image ==
The Frontier Manipur describes Priyakanta Laishram as "A Hidden Gem Of Manipuri Cinema", who breaks several barriers with his mere perspective and changing the narrative with his thought-provoking scripts. He is cited as the "Torchbearer Of Manipur Queer Cinema" by Northeast Now, who also calls him a rare creature who has mastered the art of using the cinematic medium to expose societal wrongdoings and malpractices in an industry replete with old school directors.

In 2025, Priyakanta Laishram was featured as one of the nine artists in The North-Eastern Chronicle's list of 'Emerging Artists from Northeast India You Should Watch in 2025,' recognizing his contributions to cinema and his role in pushing the boundaries of regional storytelling.

Priyakanta Laishram has often faced backlash in Manipur for his bold cinematic choices, particularly for films challenging traditional socio-cultural norms. Several reports highlight that his work has drawn trolling, cyberbullying, threats, and calls for bans. Despite these persistent challenges, critics note that Laishram continues to speak through his art with conviction, often becoming a symbol of resistance and courage within a largely conservative cinematic landscape.

In addition to his work in film-making, Laishram is known for speaking up for a variety of causes and social issues. He made a number of statements about the situation of Manipur during the 2023 Manipur violence in an effort to restore peace and normalcy. He argued the ignorance and prejudiced views of those in authority on the war, concentrating solely on the viral video of two women and ignoring other heinous crimes. Laishram said in an interview with Hindustan Times that Prime Minister Narendra Modi and Bollywood celebrities' two and a half months of total silence is a very long time and that it is truly very depressing to see how the culture and nation consistently wait for some terrible events to happen before taking a stand for something, even if it means endangering the lives of others. He continued, saying it's awful how the government and the mainstream film industries always ignore what happens in India's northeastern parts but continuously respond to what happens in other foreign countries.

In 2016, Laishram spoke out in favour of the LGBTQ community, pleading for an end to Section 377. He also actively supports children with cancer through volunteer work.

In 2023, he made a statement about same-sex unions in India, saying that the legal system needed to be set up to protect and enhance human rights and promote marriage equality. He stated that the lack of legal recognition of same-sex marriage denies social benefits and increases prejudice and violence.

Regarding the ban on Manipuri actress Soma Laishram, he denounced organisations and civic bodies in Manipur for their continued practice of banning and cancelling actors for trivial reasons. He talked on how the general populace in Manipur views artists as inferior and treats them poorly.

Laishram represented Manipur at the Rainbow Lit Fest in New Delhi in both 2020 and 2023.

== Filmography ==
Key
†	Denotes films that have not yet been released

=== As a director, producer, writer and editor ===
Year	Title	Director	Producer	Writer	Editor	Note	Ref.
2009	Lammuknarure	Yes				A children's film shot on Nokia N70 mobile phone.	
2009	Achumbadi Amarni	Yes				His second children's film shot on Nokia N70 mobile phone.	
2009	Chan-Thoibi	Yes				A children's film shot on Sony Cyber-shot camera.	
2015	It's Not My Choice	Yes		Yes	Yes	A short film addressing transgender issues.	
2017	I Am Special	Yes		Yes	Yes	A docufiction film focusing on the lives and experiences of disabled individuals.	
2018	Who Said Boys Can't Wear Makeup?	Yes	Yes	Yes	Yes	The first Indian film on gender neutral fashion and men's make-up; an educational film.	
2019	The Foul Truth	Yes	Yes	Yes	Yes	A short film addressing male rape and child sexual abuse.	
2021	Spaced Out - Panthung Di Kadaaida!	Yes		Yes	Yes	A non-feature fiction film addressing teenage substance abuse and its surrounding circumstances.	
2024	Oneness	Yes	Yes	Yes	Yes	Manipur’s first film based on a same-sex relationship; also marks his debut feature film.	
2026	Interlude †	Yes	Yes	Yes	Yes	A live-action short.	

=== As an actor ===
Year	Title	Role	Ref.
2017	I Am Special	Himself	
2018	Who Said Boys Can't Wear Makeup?	Himself	
2019	The Foul Truth	Thoithoiba	
2021	Spaced Out - Panthung Di Kadaaida!	Panthoi Sagolsem	
2024	Oneness	Ivan Martin	

== Talk show ==
Year	Title	Role	Platform	Ref.
2020	Up-Close With Priyakanta Laishram	Host	YouTube	

== Selected honors and awards ==
=== Honors ===
Year	Title	Ref.
2009	The Youngest Filmmaker by Nokia.	
2011	Manipur's Rising Star by Asian News International.	

=== Selected film awards and nominations ===
Year	Awards	Category	Film	Result	Ref.
2025	Prag Cine Awards	Best Director Northeast	Oneness	Won	
2025	Prag Cine Awards	Best Actor Northeast	Oneness	Nominated	
2025	Prag Cine Awards	Best Film Northeast	Oneness	Nominated	
2025	17th Manipur State Film Awards	Special Jury Award	Oneness	Won	
2025	8th Sailadhar Baruah Film Awards	Best Film Editor	Oneness	Won	
