= I Am Special =

- Directed by: Priyakanta Laishram
- Written by: Priyakanta Laishram
- Produced by: Harendra Laishram
- Starring: Jibanlata Laishram; Girish Asotra; Priyakanta Laishram; Bhani Khamnam
- Cinematography: Da Naoba; Jackson Naoroibam; Suzanna Samson
- Edited by: Priyakanta Laishram
- Music by: Samuel M
- Production company: Priyakanta Productions
- Release dates: 30 October 2017 (Zagreb); 11 May 2018 (Manipur)
- Running time: 47 Minutes
- Country: India
- Languages: English and Meitei

I Am Special is a 2017 Indian English-Manipuri-language docu-fiction film written and directed by Priyakanta Laishram and produced by Harendra Laishram under the banner Priyakanta Productions. It is regarded as the first English-language docu-fiction film by a Manipuri filmmaker. The film explores disability through six interconnected stories, blending documentary elements with fictional narratives. It incorporates the real-life experiences of the director's mother, Jibanlata Laishram, who lived with amyotrophic lateral sclerosis (ALS), and Girish Asotra, a boy diagnosed with Duchenne muscular dystrophy, alongside four fictional stories.

The film premiered in Zagreb during Disability Rights Week on 30 October 2017 and later received the Out of the Box Award at the Symbiosis Allied Media Awards 2017.

== Plot ==
I Am Special is a docu-fiction anthology comprising six stories centred on people living with disabilities. The film opens with the real-life story of Priyakanta Laishram's mother Jibanlata Laishram, documenting her experience with amyotrophic lateral sclerosis (ALS) through archival footage recorded during the progression of her illness. It also follows Girish Asotra, a boy from Chandigarh diagnosed with Duchenne muscular dystrophy, as he pursues his aspiration of joining the Indian Administrative Service despite the challenges posed by his condition.

The remaining four stories are fictional and follow Bhani, a deaf and mute dancer; Ria, a woman living with bipolar disorder; Tanishka, an autistic archer; and Albert, a visually impaired singer. Through a combination of documentary footage and dramatized sequences, the film depicts their everyday lives, aspirations, and experiences with disability.

== Cast ==
- Jibanlata Laishram as herself
- Girish Asotra as himself
- Priyakanta Laishram as himself
- Bhani Khamnam as Bhani
- Ruchika Sahani as Ria
- Tanishka Gujral as Tanishka
- Nirav Purohit as Albert
- Harendra Laishram as Bhani's father
- Terina Ningombam as Bhani's friend

== Production ==
=== Development ===
I Am Special was developed by Priyakanta Laishram following the death of his mother, Jibanlata Laishram, in 2016 after she had lived with amyotrophic lateral sclerosis (ALS). The film combines documentary footage with fictional narratives and comprises six stories, two of which are based on the lives of Jibanlata Laishram and Girish Asotra, a boy from Chandigarh diagnosed with Duchenne muscular dystrophy, while the remaining four are fictional.

=== Filming and Release ===
Principal photography took place in Imphal, Mumbai, and Chandigarh.

=== Release ===
I Am Special had its world premiere in Zagreb, during Disability Rights Week on 30 October 2017. It was subsequently screened in Imphal on 11 May 2018 before being released on YouTube on 13 June 2018. The film received the Out of the Box Award at the Symbiosis Allied Media Awards 2017. In January 2026, it was screened across North India through a programme supported by Accessible Services and Disability Affairs.

== Reception ==
I Am Special received positive reviews from critics. The Sangai Express described the film as a sincere and socially significant portrayal of disability. Writing for Imphal Review of Arts and Politics, Sangita Atom praised its ethical approach to disability representation and its emphasis on lived experiences over sentimentality. Poknapham commended the film's portrayal of disability as shaped by social attitudes and everyday experiences, while Daniel Sagolsem of E-Pao praised its avoidance of stereotypical representations. Signpost News described the film as a compassionate exploration of care, dignity, and humanity, highlighting its understated storytelling.
