= It's Not My Choice =

2015 Manipuri film based on transgender issues

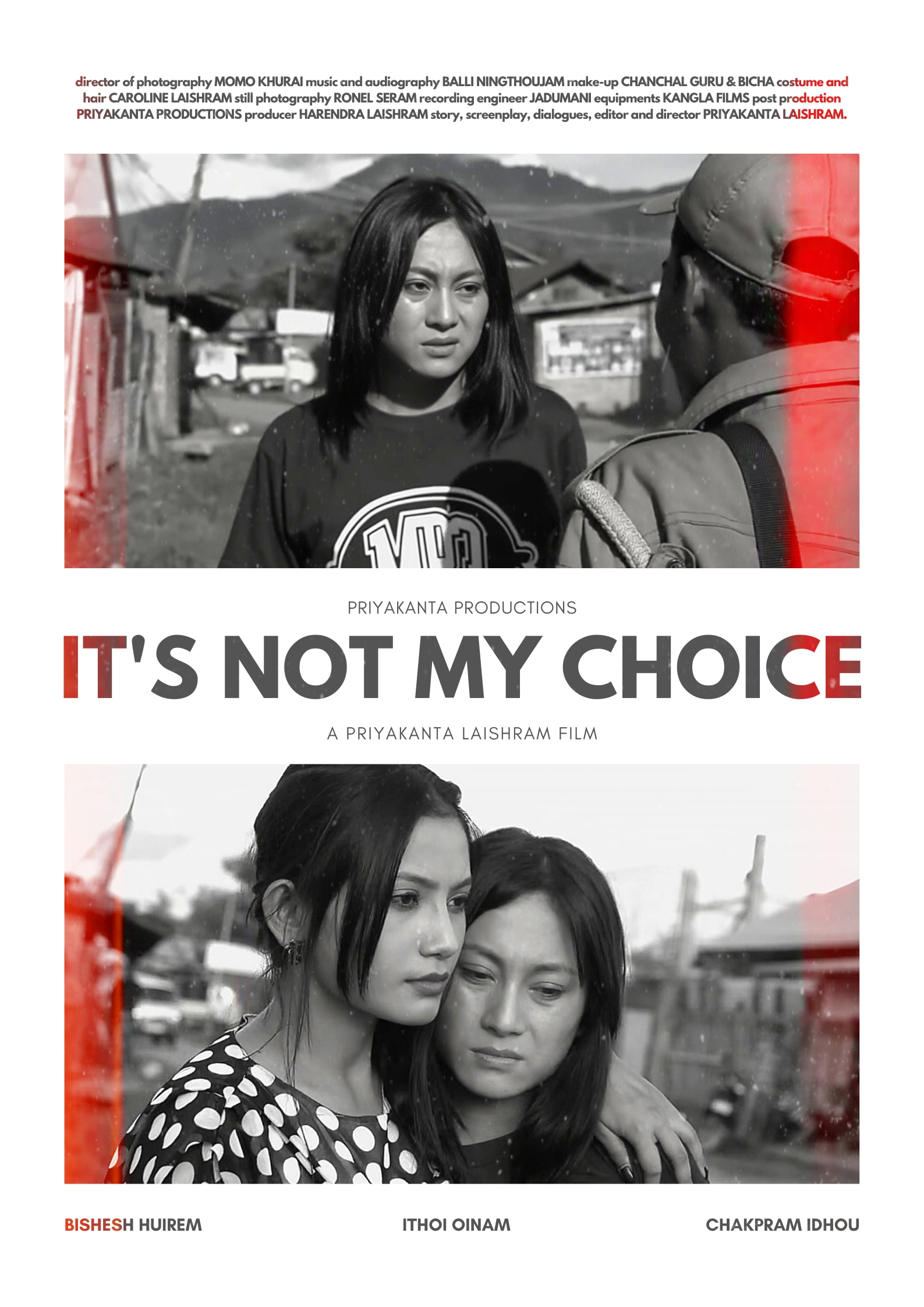
- Directed by: Priyakanta Laishram
- Written by: Priyakanta Laishram
- Produced by: Harendra Laishram
- Starring: Bishesh Huirem; Ithoi Oinam; Chakpram Idhou
- Cinematography: Momo Khurai
- Edited by: Priyakanta Laishram
- Music by: Balli Ningthoujam
- Production company: Priyakanta Productions
- Release date: 1 September 2015
- Running time: 14 minutes
- Country: India
- Language: Meiteilon (Manipuri)

It's Not My Choice (Manipuri: Eina Khankhiba Natte) is a 2015 Manipuri film written and directed by Priyakanta Laishram and produced by Harendra Laishram under the banner of Priyakanta Productions. Starring Bishesh Huirem, Ithoi Oinam, and Chakpram Idhou, the film tells the story of a young transgender Sanathoi who is deprived of her basic rights. The film was released on 1 September 2015, in Imphal at the Regional Institute Of Medical Sciences and screened at 25 film festivals. The film is the first Indian short film to be adapted in Thai and the first short film from Northeast India to surpass 1 lakh views and 1 million views on YouTube.

== Plot ==
Sanathoi, a young transgender person, is denied education by her father, who keeps her confined at home while allowing her younger sister to continue her education. Sanathoi is frequently subjected to neglect and abuse, oftentimes being given errands rather than treated with care and compassion.

While out to buy a box of cigarettes for her father, Sanathoi is ridiculed by a local shopkeeper who mocks her gender expression and blames her for the way others treat her. In response, Sanathoi questions whether her identity is something she ever chose, and leaves the shop.

On her way back home, she is stopped by two security personnel who harass and sexually shame her, suggesting that people like her exist only for others’ gratification. When Sanathoi tries to defend herself, the harassment intensifies. Ayeengbi, her friend, witnesses the incident, steps in to confront the men, and walks away with Sanathoi.

The two later sit together in a nearby park. There, Sanathoi opens up about the discrimination and emotional pain she experiences, both at home and in society. Ayeengbi listens, expresses solidarity, criticises the injustice Sanathoi faces, and encourages her to keep believing in herself and not give up hope.

After returning home, Sanathoi is confronted again by her father for forgetting to bring the cigarettes. His anger escalates, and he strikes her on the head. This time, Sanathoi stands up to him, expressing all the pain and injustice she has endured, not only from the outside world but also within her own family. She pleads for understanding, questioning how she can expect to find acceptance or love from the world when she is denied it in her own home. She affirms that her identity is not a matter of personal choice and asks why people like her are treated as less than human.

Her father, deeply affected but silent, sits down. The film ends with Sanathoi and her father sitting silently in the courtyard, Sanathoi weeping.

== Cast ==
- Bishesh Huirem as Sanathoi
- Ithoi Oinam as Ayeengbi
- Chakpram Idhou as Sanathoi's father
- Sophia Sapam as Local shopkeeper
- Terina Ningombam as Sanathoi's sister

== Production ==
=== Development ===
In an interview with Scroll.in, Priyakanta Laishram stated that he developed the idea for the film during his senior secondary education in Chandigarh, while meeting his sister's transgender friends and a friend shunned for being effeminate. He believed his films could express his authentic self and address societal taboo topics.

=== Filming ===
In a two-day schedule, principal photography for the film began in Imphal on 8 August 2015, and concluded on 9 August 2015.

On Gaylaxy, Laishram stated that the entire film was shot in 2015 during the riots, curfews, mass processions, and strikes over the Inner Line Permit in Manipur.

=== Post production and release ===
Balli Ningthoujam composed the film's music, while Priyakanta Laishram handled the editing. On 1 September 2015, the film was premiered at the Regional Institute of Medical Sciences in Imphal. Later, it was screened at Rajabhat University, Delhi University, Punjab University, and Mumbai University.

The film became the first from Northeast India to receive more than one million views after it was made available for online streaming on YouTube on 15 January 2017.

=== Adaptation ===
In 2024, the film has become the first Indian film to be adapted into Thai language.

== Reception ==
Upon release, the film received favorable reviews, with reviewers applauding the performances, writing, and direction in particular. The Sangai Express wrote, "It's Not My Choice triumphs in every aspect".

Signpost News wrote, "The 14-minute film does more in its brief running time than any other Manipuri feature film in its genre that is two or three hours long."

E-pao wrote, "A project like this comes full circle with the clear passion behind it. Definitely, a step towards more progressive Manipuri queer cinema."
