= Larei Lathup =

- Theatrical release poster
- Directed by: Ojitbabu Ningthoujam
- Written by: Ojitbabu Ningthoujam
- Produced by: Sanayai
- Starring: Silheiba Ningthoujam; Ithoi Oinam
- Cinematography: Sanjoy Chingangbam
- Edited by: Hei Sanjit
- Music by: Nanao Sagolmang
- Production company: Manira Movies
- Distributed by: Ningthou Films
- Release date: 13 November 2021
- Running time: 100 minutes
- Country: India
- Language: Meiteilon (Manipuri)

Larei Lathup is a 2021 Manipuri film written and directed by Ojitbabu Ningthoujam. It stars Silheiba Ningthoujam and Ithoi Oinam in the lead roles. The film premiered at Manipur State Film Development Society (MSFDS) on 13 November 2021. It was the opening film (fiction) at the Festival of Cinemas of Manipur 2022, a 15-day long multi-lingual film festival organised by MSFDS in April 2022.

Larei Lathup was also screened at the Sangai Film Festival 2022, organised as a part of the Manipur Sangai Festival.

== Cast ==
- Silheiba Ningthoujam as Khoiraba
- Ithoi Oinam as Leirang
- Idhou as Elangbam Pheijao
- Lilabati Chanam as Shija
- Laishram Prakash as Shija's husband
- Prem Sharma as Maiba
- Lamnganbi Laishram

== Soundtrack ==
AK Yangoi composed the soundtrack for the film and Ojitbabu Ningthoujam wrote the lyrics. The song is titled Urure Phajaba Maithong.

No.	Title	Lyrics	Music	Singer(s)	Length
1.	"Urure Phajaba Maithong"	Ojitbabu Ningthoujam	AK Yangoi	AK Yangoi	04:46
Total length:					4:46

== Accolades ==
The film won 11 awards out of the 14 nominations at the 10th MANIFA 2022.

Award	Category	Winner's name	Result	Ref.
14th Manipur State Film Awards 2022	Best Feature Film Providing Wholesome Entertainment	Chandam Yaima Devi (Producer); Ojitbabu Ningthoujam (Director)	Won	
10th MANIFA 2022	Best Feature Film	Chandam Yaima Devi (Producer); Ojitbabu Ningthoujam (Director)	Won	
10th MANIFA 2022	Best Actor in a Leading Role - Male	Silheiba Ningthoujam	Won	
10th MANIFA 2022	Best Direction	Ojitbabu Ningthoujam	Won	
10th MANIFA 2022	Best Story	Ojitbabu Ningthoujam	Won	
10th MANIFA 2022	Best Audiography	Hei Sanjit	Won	
10th MANIFA 2022	Best Costume	Galif Pa	Won	
10th MANIFA 2022	Best Background Score	Nanao Sagolmang	Won	
10th MANIFA 2022	Best Cinematography	Sanjoy Chingangbam	Won	
10th MANIFA 2022	Best Editing	Hei Sanjit	Won	
10th MANIFA 2022	Best Actor in a Supporting Role - Male	Chakpram Rameshchandra (Idhou)	Won	
10th MANIFA 2022	Best Child Artiste	Lamnganbi Laishram	Won	
10th MANIFA 2022	Best Actor in a Leading Role - Female	Ithoi Oinam	Nominated	
10th MANIFA 2022	Best Screenplay	Ojitbabu Ningthoujam	Nominated	
10th MANIFA 2022	Best Art Director	Hei Sanjit	Nominated	

== See also ==
- Eigi Nupi Tamnalai
