= The Foul Truth =

2019 film by Priyakanta Laishram

The Foul Truth - Amakpa Achumba
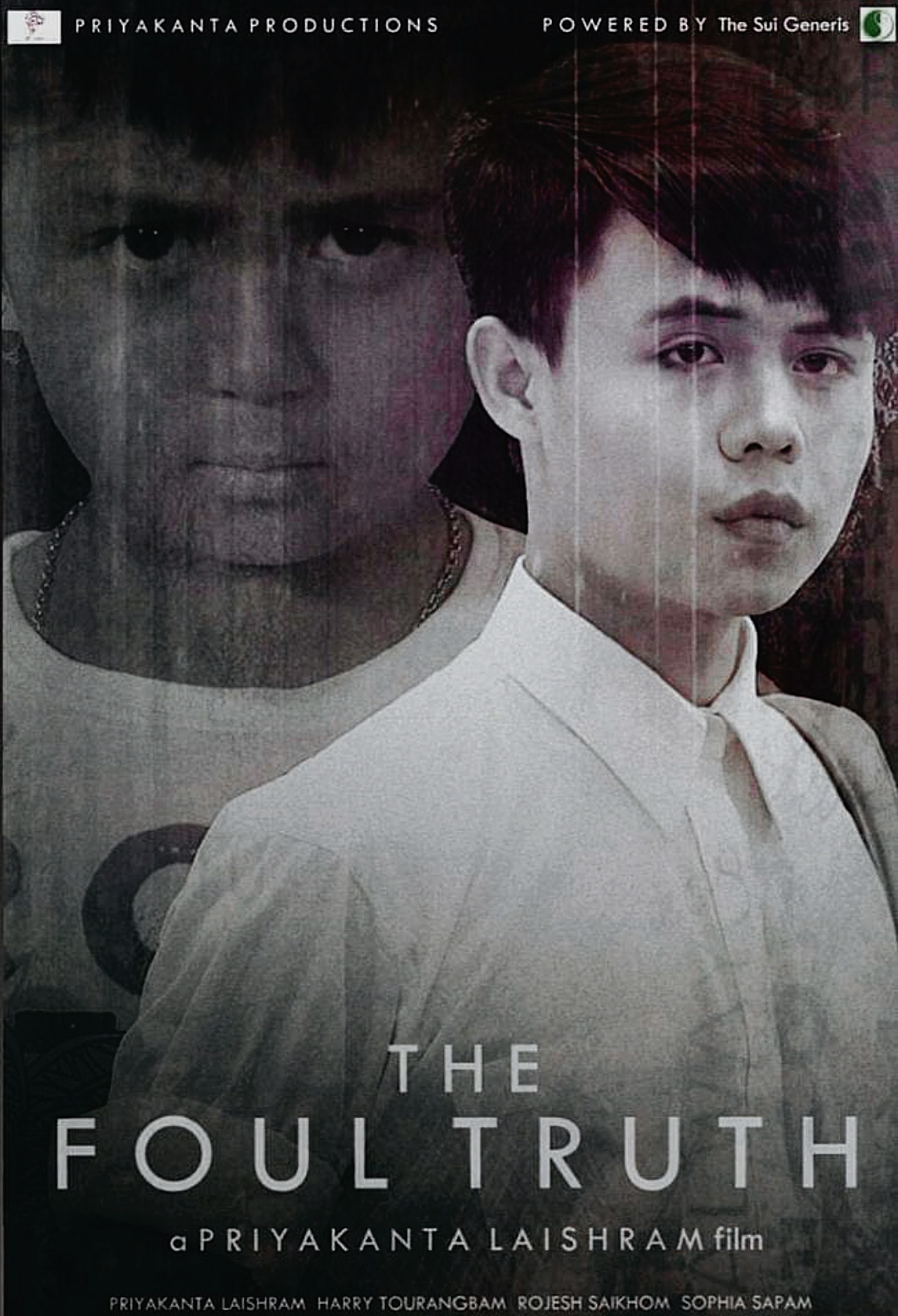
- Directed by: Priyakanta Laishram
- Produced by: Priyakanta Laishram
- Starring: Priyakanta Laishram Rojesh Saikhom; Harry Tourangbam
- Cinematography: Baldev Yambem; Satish Moirangcha
- Music by: Whitesand Music
- Production company: Priyakanta Productions
- Release date: 2 June 2019
- Country: India
- Language: Meitei language (officially called Manipuri language)

The Foul Truth (Manipuri: Amakpa Achumba) is a 2019 Manipuri film written, produced and directed by Priyakanta Laishram under the production banner, Priyakanta Productions. It is the first film from Northeast India to tackle the issue of male rape. The film tells the story of a boy named Thoithoiba, who is a survivor of child sexual abuse and male rape. The film stars Priyakanta Laishram, Harry Tourangbam and Rojesh Saikhom. The film was released on 2 June 2019. The film was screened at 33 international film festivals and won several awards, including Best Actor in a Leading Role, Best Film on Other Social Issues, and Best Screenplay awards.

== Plot ==
Thoithoiba, a shy and introverted college student, faces daily ridicule for his anti-social behaviours. Even his family complains about his lack of socialisation and masculinity. Thoithoiba feels deeply disturbed and traumatised, but no one acknowledges or understands his feelings. One day after college, while he waits for his father to pick him up, he calls his mother to ask where his father is. When his younger sister answered the phone, she informed him that their uncle had left to pick him up. This triggers upsetting childhood memories, causing Thoithoiba to hang up the phone and become rattled.

His classmates notice and start mocking him, which leads to a confrontation and a fight. Thoithoiba's uncle arrives and accuses him in front of the bullies. Disheartened, Thoithoiba returns home to a family that blames him for the college brawl without showing any remorse. Unable to bear it any longer, he confronts them and reveals his long-buried trauma of being regularly raped by his uncle. Thoithoiba cries uncontrollably, accusing each member of his family of being responsible for his life of horror, fury, shame, and guilt, and criticising toxic masculinity and unfavourable norms that led to his abuse.

As the film ends, Thoithoiba sees a younger version of himself and finds solace in their connection. They share a triumphant moment before the younger self disappears, leaving Thoithoiba with a sigh.

== Cast ==
- Priyakanta Laishram as Thoithoiba
- Rojesh Saikhom as Thoithoiba's uncle
- Harry Tourangbam as Young Thoithoiba
- Harendra Laishram as Thoithoiba's father
- Sophia Sapam as Thoithoiba's mother
- Indira Khaidem as Thoithoiba's distant relative
- Caroline Laishram as College professor
- Terina Ningombam as Thoithoiba's younger sister
- Bhani Khamnam as College student
- Bronson Mutum as College student
- Nongpoknganba Khoirom as College student
- Jackson Naoroibam as College student
- Yaiphabi Toijam as College student
- Eshika Luwang as College student

== Production ==
=== Development ===
In an interview with Scroll.in, Priyakanta Laishram stated that while attending senior secondary school in Chandigarh, he was sexually assaulted by two men. The trauma he faced as a result of the assault gave him the courage to speak out through this film.

Regarding the funding, Laishram said that due to the subject matter of the film, none of the other producers were willing to invest, and he had to produce it himself. It was also revealed that Laishram would play the role of a sexual assault survivor in the film.

In 2018, when the film was announced, Laishram received backlash from a group of people who didn't understand the problem of male rape. In an interview with The Indian Express, Laishram said he received threatening calls from different insurgent groups regarding the film.

=== Filming ===
The principal photography of the film commenced on 22 May 2018. After a 4-day schedule, the film wrapped up its shoot on 26 May 2018.

Talking about the film, Laishram said, "It is hard for the male survivors to tell someone that they have experienced sexual abuse because of the stereotypes about masculinity. Those thousands of tortured individuals whose voices and cries have been silenced by society were brought to light through this film.”

=== Post production and release ===
The Foul Truth was edited by Priyakanta Laishram and the music was composed by Whitesand Music. It was released on 2 June 2019.

== Reception ==
The Foul Truth received rave reviews from critics. Sangita Atom of The Sangai Express wrote, "The Foul Truth - Amakpa Achumba, is a very sad and jarring film about some of the most atrocious behaviour of humankind. It stands out from the rest with a non-dramatised version of reality. Overall, it is an excellent cinema with top-notch direction, dialogue, performances, and sound design". Northeast Now wrote, "The film delves deeply into the patriarchy that predominantly exists in our society and how the culture of victim blaming and shaming has resulted in numerous unintended consequences."

== Accolades ==
Award	Category	Winner's name	Result	Reference
World Freedom Film Festival 2018	Best Best Actor in a Leading Role	Priyakanta Laishram	Won	
World Freedom Film Festival 2018	Best Sound Design	Priyakanta Laishram	Won	
St. Leuven International Short Film Festival 2019	Best Film on Other Social Issues	Priyakanta Laishram (Producer and Director)	Won	
Symbiosis Allied Media Awards 2019	Best Actor in a Leading Role	Priyakanta Laishram	Won	
Indian Independent Film Festival 2018	Best Background Score	Whitesand Music	Won	
Short Motion Pictures Wave National Festival 2019	Best Actor Award - Critics	Priyakanta Laishram	Won	
Short Motion Pictures Wave National Festival 2019	Best Screenplay	Priyakanta Laishram	Won	
Human Rights Asian Film Festival 2019	Unconventional Film Award	Priyakanta Laishram (Producer and Director)	Won	
Jalandhar National Short Film Festival 2019	Best Actor in a Motion Picture - Drama	Priyakanta Laishram	Won	
