= Thrissur International Film Festival =

Indian film festival

International Film Festival of Thrissur (IFFT) is an annual event held in Thrissur in Kerala. It started in August 2004 as a joint venture by Thrissur Chalachitra Kendram, a film fraternity of Thrissur, Thrissur Corporation, Thrissur Jilla panchayath, Kerala State Film Development Corporation and the Federation of Film Societies of India. It is the second-largest film festival in Kerala. Masters and Classics, Children's films, Young films, Beyond Universe, Folk waves and Contemporary World Films are the major sessions in the festival.
