= Oneness (film) =

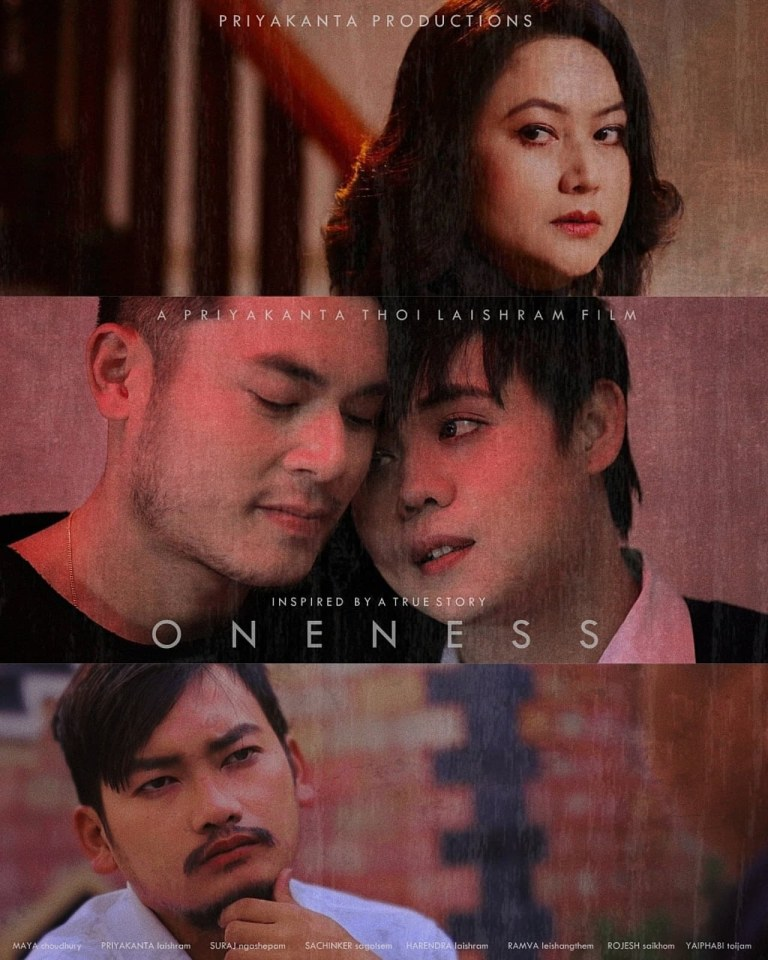
- Oneness - First Poster
- Directed by: Priyakanta Laishram
- Produced by: Roushil Singla; Priyakanta Laishram
- Starring: Maya Choudhury; Priyakanta Laishram; Suraj Ngashepam; Sachinker Sagolsem
- Production company: Priyakanta Productions
- Release dates: 17 May 2024 (Mumbai); 15 December 2024 (Manipur)
- Running time: 114.17 Minutes
- Country: India
- Language: Meitei language (officially called Manipuri language)

Oneness is a 2024 Manipuri movie directed by Priyakanta Laishram. It is the first gay-themed movie of Manipur, Northeast India. It is the first mainstream Manipuri movie to deal with same-sex relationships and sexual identity. The film revolves around an 18-year-old queer boy named Ivan Martin, who tragically lost his life because of his sexual identity. Produced by Roushil Singla and Priyakanta Laishram under the banner Priyakanta Productions, it stars Maya Choudhury, Priyakanta Laishram, Suraj Ngashepam and Sachinker Sagolsem in the lead roles.

Having had its world premiere at South Asia's biggest queer film festival KASHISH Pride Film Festival 2024, the film was officially selected and has been screened at several other film festivals including the 14th Bangalore Queer Film Festival 2024 and the 2nd Eikhoigi Imphal International Film Festival 2025 and received several nominations and accolades, including two Manipur State Film Awards and a pan-Northeast India Best Director-Northeast award at the Prag Cine Awards 2025.

== Cast ==
- Priyakanta Laishram as Ivan Martin.
- Maya Choudhury as Anna Martin.
- Suraj Ngashepam as Pamheiba Hijam.
- Sachinker Sagolsem as Daniel Martin.
- Ramva Leishangthem as Mersia Martin.
- Harendra Laishram as Peter Martin.
- Rojesh Saikhom as Pastor John.
- Yaiphabi Toijam as Mary D'Souza.
- Taton Sagolsem as Inspector Ton.
- Naorem Naoba Mei as Police Constable.
- Supriya Wangkhem as Pamheiba's mother.
- Terina Ningombam as Daniel Martin's girlfriend.

== Production ==
=== Development ===
In December 2021, Priyakanta Laishram had stated that the film is inspired by one of the rare cases of gay honor killing in Northeast India and it took him two years to develop and finalise the script. It was revealed that the film, which would star Maya Choudhury, Priyakanta Laishram, Suraj Ngashepam, and Sachinker Sagolsem in the key roles, will begin production by the end of January 2022.

It was reported that Laishram was contacted in 2020 by a relative of the real-life individual who inspired the film, who shared personal diaries and family recollections that informed the screenplay. According to the publication, the individual was soft-spoken, did not identify with an effeminate manner of expression, preferred wearing makeup, and kept his hair slightly long with front bangs. The report stated that these characteristics were reflected in the film, while names, locations and certain events were fictionalised to protect the identities of those involved.

On The Indian Express, Laishram stated that it took him eight months to find an actor to play a gay character.

In an interview with India Today, Laishram claimed that because the film is based on a true story, he did most of the research and played a significant role in reconstructing the events.

Speaking on finances, Laishram said on Scroll.in that after two years of struggling to produce Oneness, Roushil Singla, helped him out financially and that he sincerely shared his idea and was eager to join as one of the producers.

=== Filming ===
The principal photography of the film commenced on 19 January 2022, in Imphal. The film wrapped up its shoot on 28 March 2022. The movie's production cost 15 lakh Indian rupees.

=== Post-production ===
The Central Board of Film Certification granted the film a U/A certificate on 26 September 2024 at Guwahati.

== Release and film festivals ==
Oneness was officially selected at the KASHISH Pride Film Festival 2024, and made its world premiere on 17 May 2024 at Cinepolis, Mumbai.

The film was also officially selected as the lone entry from Northeast India for the 14th Bangalore Queer Film Festival, 2024, where it made its Bangalore premiere on August 24, 2024. Oneness is the first Meitei-language film to be shown at the festival.

Oneness premiered theatrically on December 15, 2024, at Manipur State Film Development Society (MSFDS) in Imphal and the film later had an extended run at Tanthapolis and KUMECS Cinema.

At the 2nd Eikhoigi Imphal International Film Festival 2025, Oneness got official selection under the Manipur Matinee section. Oneness also received an official selection at the 2nd North East India Film Festival, Manipur 2025, in the Competition Section.

The film was nominated in four major categories at the Prag Cine Awards 2025: Best Film Northeast, Best Director Northeast (Priyakanta Laishram), Best Actor Male Northeast (Priyakanta Laishram), and Best Actor Female Northeast (Maya Choudhury). Out of this, Priyakanta Laishram won the Best Director Northeast Award.

The film was a finalist in the Competition section of the Aravali International Film Festival 2025, which was held at Alliance Française de Delhi, and was nominated for Best Cinematography.

At the 17th Manipur State Film Awards 2025 given by the Government of Manipur and Manipur State Film Development Society, the film won the Special Jury Award (Feature Film) for Laishram and producer Roushil Singla and a Best Supporting Actor - Female award for Maya Choudhury, marking her first ever award in a 28-year career.

At the 7th Sangai Film Festival 2025 in Manipur, the film was officially selected for screening.

Priyakanta Laishram won the Best Film Editor award at the 8th Sailadhar Baruah Film Awards 2025 for the film.

== Reception ==
Elle Magazine listed Oneness as one of the "8 Films to Watch Out For" at the Kashish Pride Film Festival 2024.

Mid-Day also included Oneness in their "10 Films to Watch Out For" list for the same festival.

In 2026, Firstpost recognized Oneness in its list of 5 notable Manipuri films.

The film received widespread critical acclaim upon its release. India Today NE praised Oneness for its sensitive portrayal of queer lives, family relationships, and acceptance, describing it as a landmark in Manipuri cinema for openly depicting same-sex relationships. Imphal Review of Arts and Politics hailed Oneness as “a defiant cinematic stand against deep-rooted socio-cultural intolerance”. The review applauded Priyakanta Laishram’s emotionally raw performance and empathetic direction while praising the film’s powerful storytelling, intimate cinematography, and immersive sound design. It further noted that the film shatters silence around queerness in Manipur with “grace, empathy, and unflinching honesty” and called it “not just a film but a cultural awakening.”

International Federation of Film Critics India noted that the film expanded the narrative boundaries of Manipuri cinema. It observed that the film brought marginalized experiences to the forefront, broadening the representation of individuals and identities within Manipuri filmmaking. FIPRESCI India further described the film as part of a wider shift towards a more inclusive portrayal of Manipuri society.

The Sangai Express (English) described Oneness as "a significant milestone in Manipuri cinema, shedding light on the complexities of human relationships and the societal pressures that often dictate them. It is a film that will be remembered not only for its storytelling and performances but, more importantly, for its cultural impact." E-Pao gave the film a 5/5 rating, describing it as "A Brave, Pioneering Triumph in Manipuri Cinema." The review further stated, "As Priyakanta Laishram and his team continue to pave the way for more inclusive storytelling, Oneness will undoubtedly remain a milestone in the history of Manipuri and Indian cinema." In its 4 out of 5 stars review, Signpost News described Oneness as "the film that dared to say what Manipur silenced," noting its confident direction and emotionally impactful storytelling. Manipuri Wiki praised Oneness for offering a distinctive glimpse into Manipuri cinema and for its authentic representation of a marginalized community.

Reviewing for the Manipuri-language Poknapham, Yambem Tombi Devi wrote that the film offered a fresh perspective on queer lives in Manipuri society by encouraging audiences to view queer people with empathy and humanity. She also praised Priyakanta Laishram's portrayal of Ivan for conveying the character's emotional depth and commended the performances, and overall technical execution. Writing in Poknapham – The People's Chronicle, Aribam Dhurv Sharma called Oneness one of the finest films on queer lives from Northeast India, noting its empathetic storytelling and universal message of belonging.

Writing for the Manipuri-language The Sangai Express, actor and film critic Rajkumar Jnanaranjan described Oneness as a significant advancement for Manipuri digital cinema, praising its visual language, the producers' support for the project, and Laishram's performance as Ivan. He also commented that Pamheiba's family background could have been developed further.

== Accolades ==
Award	Category	Winner's name	Result	References
Prag Cine Awards 2025	Best Film Northeast	Producers: Roushil Singla Priyakanta Laishram	Nominated	
Prag Cine Awards 2025	Best Director Northeast	Priyakanta Laishram	Won	
Prag Cine Awards 2025	Best Actor Northeast	Priyakanta Laishram	Nominated	
Prag Cine Awards 2025	Best Actress Northeast	Maya Choudhury	Nominated	
Aravali International Film Festival 2025	Best Cinematography	Boong Konjengbam Ibomcha Irom	Nominated	
17th Manipur State Film Awards 2025	Best Actor in a Supporting Role - Female	Maya Choudhury	Won	
17th Manipur State Film Awards 2025	Special Jury Award	Producers: Roushil Singla & Priyakanta Laishram; Director: Priyakanta Laishram	Won	
8th Sailadhar Baruah Film Awards 2025	Best Film Editor	Priyakanta Laishram	Won	

== Controversies ==
Before its release, Oneness faced controversies in Manipur due to its queer theme and the prevailing conservative attitudes toward gender and sexuality. The situation escalated after a promotional interview in which lead actress Maya Choudhury stated that she does not watch films in which she does not star. The remark was misinterpreted and contributed to mounting criticism. Several organizations reportedly attempted to block the film's release, and filmmaker Priyakanta Laishram received threats and online harassment. In a live video before the premiere, Laishram broke down emotionally while speaking about the pressures, revealing the toll the prolonged backlash had taken on him.
