= Apaiba Leichil =

- Poster
- Directed by: Bobby Wahengbam
- Screenplay by: Bobby Wahengbam; Manorama Meinam
- Story by: Rajmani Ayekpam
- Produced by: Wahengbam Tomba; Hanjabam Sobhananda Sharma; Bobby Wahengbam
- Starring: Arun Yumnam; Bishesh Huirem
- Cinematography: Irom Maipak; Bobo; Devdharshan; Tomal
- Edited by: R.K. Lalmani
- Music by: Jeetenkumar Naorem; Kokobi
- Production company: Third Eye
- Release date: 2021
- Running time: 109 minutes
- Country: India
- Language: Meiteilon (Manipuri)

Apaiba Leichil (English: Flurry Clouds) is a 2021 Manipuri film directed by Bobby Wahengbam. It is jointly produced by Wahengbam Tomba, Hanjabam Sobhananda (Bung) Sharma and Bobby Wahengbam under the banner of Third Eye Productions. The film is based on the short story Nungshibagi Saklon (Nungsitombi) by Rajmani Ayekpam. It stars Bishesh Huirem and Arun Yumnam in the lead roles. The film won three awards at the 14th Manipur State Film Awards 2022. It got official selections at the 18th International Film Festival of Thrissur 2023, Kerala and Kashish International Queer Film Festival 2023, Mumbai. The movie was screened at the Sangai Film Festival 2022, which was organised as a part of the Manipur Sangai Festival.

The film shows the conditions of the Nupi Sabis (Meitei for 'transgender people') in Manipur. It shows one Nupi Sabi becoming popular in the Shumang Kumhei troupe but whether the popularity of Nupi Sabis is related to their personal romantic life and social outlook is not properly known.

== Cast ==
- Yumnam Arun
- Bishesh Huirem
- Naoba
- Laimayum Nirmala
- Jenny
- Rohit
- Heisnam Geeta
- Nunglen Luwang
- Reshmina

== Accolades ==
Bishesh Huirem bagged the Best Actor Award at the 14th Manipur State Film Awards 2022. With this, Huirem became the first transgender person to win the award.

Award	Category	Winner's name	Result
14th Manipur State Film Awards 2022	Best Actor	Bishesh Huirem	Won
14th Manipur State Film Awards 2022	Best Editor	R.K. Lalmani	Won
14th Manipur State Film Awards 2022	Special Mention	Bobby Wahengbam	Won
5th Sailadhar Baruah Film Awards 2023	Jury Special Mention	Bishesh Huirem	Won

== See also ==
- List of Meitei-language films
