= Bobby Wahengbam =

Indian film director

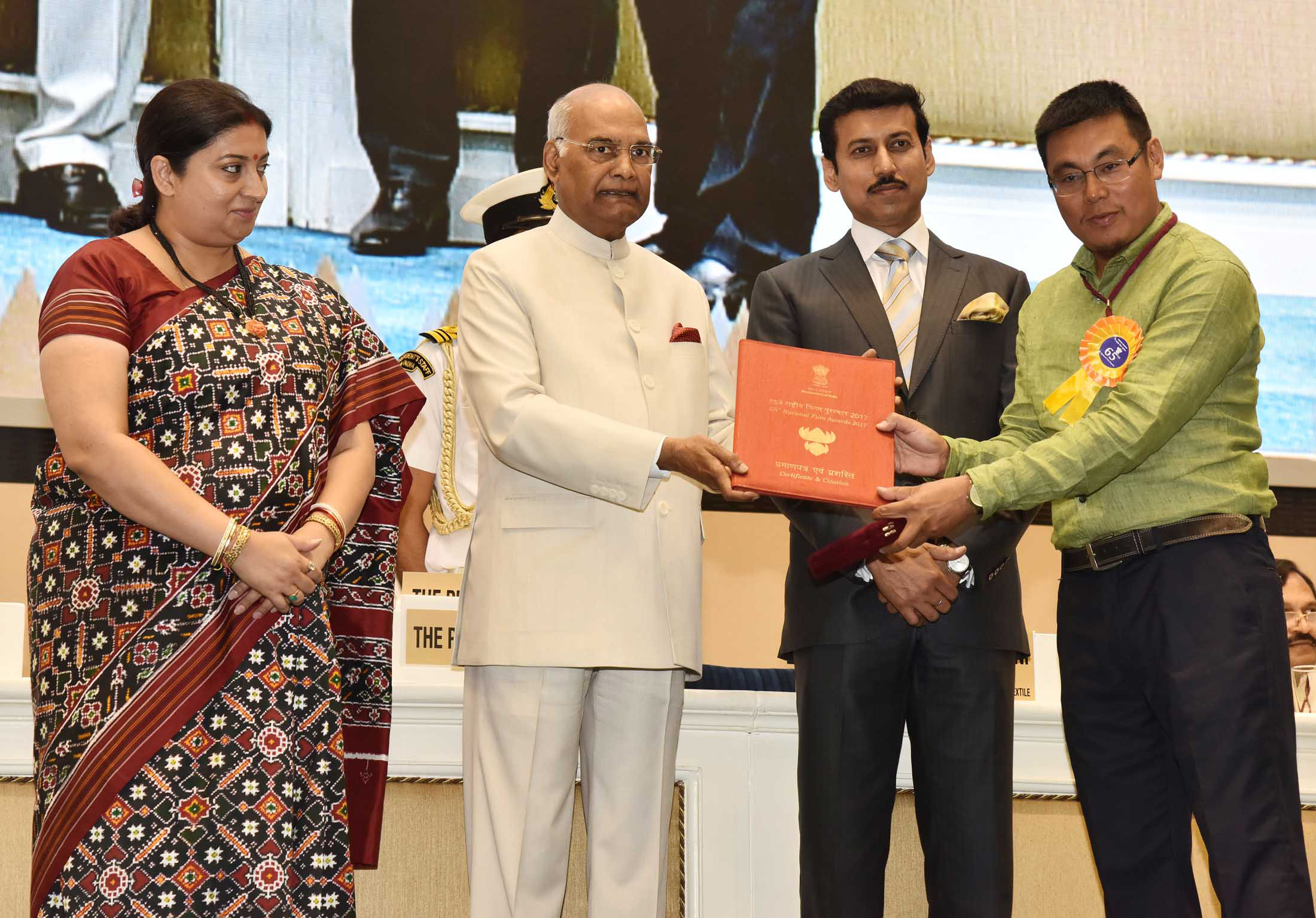
- Wahengbam receiving the Swarna Kamal Award from the President, Shri Ram Nath Kovind at the 65th National Film Awards
- Born: Wahengbam Khemananda Singh
- Education: M.A. (History), University of Bombay
- Occupations: Director, Producer, Writer, Film Critic
- Awards: National Film Award for Best Book on Cinema (2017); National Film Award for Best Feature Film in Manipuri (2019)

Bobby Wahengbam is an Indian filmmaker, producer, writer and film critic known for his works in Manipuri films. He has written for newspapers including Poknapham, the Sangai Express, Imphal Free Press, Hueiyen Lanpao, and was a regular contributor for The People's Chronicle.

Wahengbam is the founder of the production house Third Eye, which produced the film Apaiba Leichil. In 2018, his book Matamgi Manipur: The First Manipuri Feature Film won Best Book on Cinema at the 65th National Film Awards. The next year, his film Eigi Kona was released; it won National Film Award for Best Feature Film in Manipuri at the 67th awards.

== Education ==
Wahengbam attended Imphal College where he studied PU Sc (Science). He did postgraduate studies at the University of Bombay and received a diploma in Film & TV Production from Xavier's Institute of Communication.

== Accolades ==
- Writing on Film

Award	Category	Work	Ref.
10th Manipur State Film Awards 2016	Best Book on Cinema	Manipuri Cinema: A World of Its Own	
10th Manipur State Film Awards 2016	Best Critic Award		
65th National Film Awards	Swarna Kamal for Best Book on Cinema	Matamgi Manipur: The First Manipuri Feature Film	

- Film & TV Production/Direction

Award	Category	Film	Ref.
7th Manipur State Film Festival 2010	Best Film on Social Issues	Roshni	
9th Manipur State Film Awards 2014	Best Film on Social Issue and Jury's Award	Soft Target	
67th National Film Awards	Rajat Kamal for Best Feature Film in Manipuri	Eigi Kona	
13th Manipur State Film Awards 2020	Jury Special Mention	Eigi Kona	
14th Manipur State Film Awards 2022	Special Mention	Apaiba Leichil	
15th Manipur State Film Awards 2023	Special Jury Award	Padma Shri Wareppa Naba: Rituals to Mainstream	

== Bibliography ==
Year	Title	Publisher
2015	Manipuri Cinema: A World of Its Own	Yaibiren Publication, Imphal
2017	Matamgi Manipur: The First Manipuri Feature Film	Angomningthou Preservation & Documentation, Imphal

== Filmography ==
Year	Title	Category	Studio	Notes
1988	Emmasu Emmani	Telefilm	DDK Imphal	
1999	Emma Keithel	Documentary	DDK Imphal	
1999	Yubi Lakpi	Documentary	DDK Imphal	
2000	Post & Telecommunication in Manipur	Documentary	DDK Imphal	
2001	Tatkhraba Punshi Leipul	Telefilm	DDK Imphal	
2001	Crafts Society, Manipur	Documentary	DDK Imphal	
2002	This-abled man	Documentary	DDK Imphal	
2003	Costume of the Kabuis	Documentary	PPC-NE	
2004	Achievers	Documentary	PPC-NE	
2004	Orphanage to Olympics	Documentary	PSBT, New Delhi & Films Division, Mumbai	Participated in 1st North East Film Festival 2005 Shillong, Road Show of North East Documentary Film Festival 2005 Aizawl, Manipur State Film Festivals organised by Film Forum (2007) and MFDC (2010).
2006	Two Immortal Love Stories	Serial	Doordarshan-NE	
2007	Joseph Ki Macha	Short Fiction	DDK Imphal	Participated in 10 MIFF 2008 Mumbai, Kathmandu Mountain Film Festival 2008, 3rd VIBGYOR International Film Festival Trichur 2008, 14th Kolkata Film Festival 2008, Twilight New Delhi 2008, Sign Film Festival 2009 Thiruvananthapuram and North East Film Festival 2009.
2008	Blank Frame	Serial	Doordarshan, PPC-NE	
2008	Operation Theatre	Short on HIV/AIDS	OSD, Melinda Gates Foundation & Melbourne University	
2009	Roshni	Documentary on HIV/AIDS	OSD, Melinda Gates Foundation & Melbourne University	Got selection in the competition section of the 11th Mumbai International Film Festival 2010. Participated in Kerala International Film Festival 2010.
2010	Rhythm	Short, 35mm cinemascope	Films Division, Mumbai	
2011	Three Women	Documentary	Films Division, Mumbai	
2011	Fenced People	Documentary	PSBT, New Delhi & Films Division, Mumbai	
2013	Soft Target	Documentary	Films Division, Mumbai	Participated in Sign Film Festival 2016, Kerala and Films North East 2016, Itanagar.
2019	Speak Up	Documentary	TOM TV, Imphal	
2019	Kaona Yen	Documentary	TOM TV, Imphal	
2019	Eigi Kona	Feature	Luwang Apokpa Mamikol Productions	Official selections at the Indian Panorama (51st IFFI 2020), Indica Film Utsav 2020, Thrissur International Film Festival 2021 and 4th OIFFA Canada 2021.
2021	Apaiba Leichil	Feature	Third Eye Productions	Official selections at the 18th International Film Festival of Thrissur 2023, Kerala and Kashish International Queer Film Festival 2023, Mumbai.
2022	Padma Shri Wareppa Naba: Rituals to Mainstream	Documentary	Films Division, Mumbai	Official selections at the North East Film Festival 2023, Mumbai and 29th Kolkata International Film Festival.
