= Cinema of Manipur =

Indian filmmaking in Manipur

- No. of screens: approx. 30 screens in Manipur

Produced feature films
- Total: 30-40 films per annum

The Cinema of Manipur is the film industry based in Manipur, India. It includes not only Meitei language movies but also productions in the various languages spoken by Manipur's different communities. The Manipuri film industry was born with the release of Matamgi Manipur by Debkumar Bose on 9 April 1972. From Aribam Syam Sharma's Imagi Ningthem and Ishanou, Oken Amakcham's Lammei, Haobam Paban Kumar's Loktak Lairembee, to Priyakanta Laishram's Oneness, and Lakshmipriya Devi's Boong, Manipuri cinema has evolved in terms of both form and cultural expression.

Prior to Matamgi Manipur, several attempts were made to produce films in the state, the most significant being Mainu Pemcha in 1948, which was left incomplete. Aribam Syam Sharma's Ishanou, screened in the Un Certain Regard section at the 1991 Cannes Film Festival, was the only Indian film to be considered under the Cannes Classic section at the 2023 Cannes Film Festival. In 2002, the Revolutionary People's Front banned Hindi-language films from being shown in the state, leading to increased interest in Manipuri-language cinema and decreased attendance in local theatres. In 2026, the film Boong became the first Indian film to receive a British Academy of Film and Television Arts award, representing a development for Manipuri cinema in an international context.

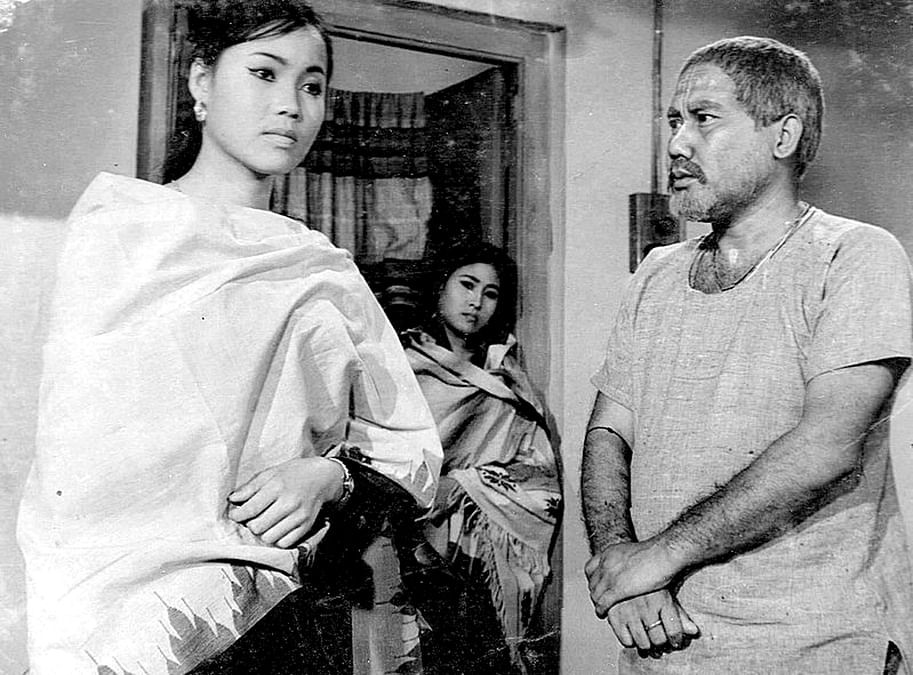
A scene from the first Manipuri feature film Matamgi Manipur (1972)

== Notable feature films: 1972-2022 ==
This section covers notable Manipuri feature films released between 9 April 1972 and 9 April 2022. Notable films, in this context, include those films which have participated or won awards in national and international film festivals, and the films which have made history (for example, first full-length film, first filmmaker, first color film, longest movie).

Year of release	Film	Notes	Director
1972	Matamgi Manipur	The first Manipuri feature film. Won Best Feature Film in Manipuri at the 20th National Film Awards.	Debkumar Bose
1973	Brojendragee Luhongba	Manipuri movie made by the first filmmaker of Manipur Sapam Nodia Chand.	S.N. Chand
1976	Saaphabee	The first Manipuri folk movie. Won Best Feature Film in Manipuri at the 24th National Film Awards.	Aribam Syam Sharma
1980	Olangthagee Wangmadasoo	Won the National Film Award for Best Feature Film in Manipuri at the 27th National Film Awards.	Aribam Syam Sharma
1981	Imagi Ningthem	Won the Golden Montgolfiere at the Festival des 3 Continents, Nantes, in 1982, becoming the first Indian film to win a grand prix award. Won the National Film Award for Best Child Artist (Master Leikhendra) and National Film Award for Best Feature Film in Manipuri at the 29th National Film Awards.	Aribam Syam Sharma
1983	Sanakeithel	Won the National Film Award for Best Feature Film in Manipuri at the 31st National Film Awards.	M. A. Singh
1983	Paokhum Ama	The first Manipuri colour (short) feature film (runtime: 54 minutes). Screened at the Tyneside International Film Festival, U.K.	Aribam Syam Sharma
1984	Langlen Thadoi	The first Manipuri colour full-length feature film. First film to be produced by a woman, Kh. Sakhi Devi.	M. A. Singh
1986	Nonglei	The first VHS feature film in the Meiteilon language.	Ramchandra
1990	Ishanou	Screened at the Un Certain Regard section of the 1991 Cannes International Film Festival. Won the National Film Award for Best Feature Film in Manipuri and Special Mention (Anoubam Kiranmala) Award at the 38th National Film Awards. The restored version was selected for world premiere at the prestigious Cannes Classic section of the Cannes Film Festival 2023.	Aribam Syam Sharma
1992	Khonthang	Selected for Indian Panorama of the International Film Festival of India, New Delhi, in 1993. Invited to Singapore International Film Festival 1994 and Festival of SPARROW, Mumbai, 2008.	Oken Amakcham
1993	Sambal Wangma	Won the National Film Award for Best Feature Film in Manipuri at the 41st National Film Awards. Selected for Indian Panorama of the International Film Festival of India 1994.	K. Ibohal Sharma
1993	Madhabee	Movie with the longest running time (197 minutes) in the history of Manipuri cinema. It is based on the first Manipuri novel of the same title by Dr. Lamabam Kamal.	L. Banka Sharma
1994	Mayophy Gee Macha	Won the National Film Award for Best Feature Film in Manipuri at the 42nd National Film Awards.	Oken Amakcham
1995	Sanabi	Won the National Film Award for Best Feature Film in Manipuri at the 43rd National Film Awards. Screened at the International Film Festival of India and Cairo International Film Festival, Egypt.	Aribam Syam Sharma
1997	Khamba Thoibi	Based on the Mahakavya (epic) Khamba Thoibi written by Hijam Anganghal.	Moirangthem Nilamani Singh
2000	Chatledo Eidi	Won the National Film Award for Best Feature Film in Manipuri at the 48th National Film Awards. Selected for Indian Panorama of the 32nd International Film Festival of India 2001.	Makhonmani Mongsaba
2000	Paari	The first Manipuri children's film.	Aribam Syam Sharma
2002	Lammei	The first Manipuri video film to have a commercial screening at a theatre. It marked the beginning of a digital era in Manipuri cinema.	Oken Amakcham
2007	Yenning Amadi Likla	Entered into the feature film section of the Indian Panorama of the International Film Festival of India 2007.	Makhonmani Mongsaba
2009	Nobap	Opening film at the 2nd Guwahati Film Festival 2009.	Heisnam Tomba
2009	Keibu Keioiba	Official selection in the Mumbai International Film Festival (MIFF) 2010; first animated feature film in Manipuri.	Bhumenjoy Konsam
2011	Phijigee Mani	Received award for Best Supporting Actress (Leishangthem Tonthoingambi Devi) and the regional award for National Film Award for Best Feature Film in Manipuri at the 59th National Film Awards. Selected for Indian Panorama 2011.	Oinam Gautam Singh
2011	Fried Fish, Chicken Soup and a Premiere Show	National Film Award for Best Arts/Cultural Film at the 59th National Film Awards.	Mamta Murthy
2012	Leipaklei	Selected for 14th Jeonju International Film Festival, South Korea 2012, 18th Kolkata International Film Festival and 5th Guwahati Film Festival. Won the National Film Award for Best Feature Film in Manipuri at the 60th National Film Awards.	Aribam Syam Sharma
2013	Nangna Kappa Pakchade	Received Special Jury Award with the title Epic Mirror of the Century in the Kinshasa International Film Festival 2017. Screened at Ladakh International Film Festival 2014 in the Indian Feature section.	Makhonmani Mongsaba
2014	Pallepfam	Screened in the 10th Habitat Film Festival in May 2015. Opened the 2nd edition of Fragrances from the Northeast, a 3-day festival of cinema from the northeast. Official selection in the 46th International Film Festival of India (IFFI) 2015 under the section New Horizon from the North East.	Wanglen Khundongbam
2015	Eibusu Yaohanbiyu	Won the National Film Award for Best Feature Film in Manipuri at the 63rd National Film Awards.	Maipaksana Haorongbam
2016	Loktak Lairembee	Participated in around 16 International Film Festivals across the globe and won several awards. Won Best Film on Environment/Conservation/Preservation at the 64th National Film Awards.	Haobam Paban Kumar
2018	Magi Matambakta	Selected for Bengaluru International Film Festival 2018, Third Eye Asian Film Festival, Mumbai 2020 and Delhi International Film Festival 2020. Won the Best Manipuri Film in the 2nd Jharkhand International Film Festival Awards (JIFFA) 2019.	Makhonmani Mongsaba
2019	Nongphadok Lakpa Atithi	Premiered at the 3rd Guwahati International Film Festival as the Opening Film of the Indian Section. Official selection at 5th North-East Film Festival 2020, Pune. Opening Film at 12th International Guwahati Film Festival 2020.	Aribam Syam Sharma
2019	Pandam Amada	World premiered at the Dhaka International Film Festival 2020.	Oinam Gautam Singh
2019	Eigi Kona	Won the National Film Award for Best Feature Film in Manipuri at the 67th National Film Awards. Selected for the 51st International Film Festival of India (Indian Panorama) in the feature section. Official selections at the Indica Film Utsav 2020, 4th Ottawa Indian Film Festival Awards (OIFFA) 2021 and Thrissur International Film Festival 2021.	Bobby Wahengbam and Maipaksana Haorongbam
2020	Nine Hills One Valley	Special Mention Award in the Film Bazaar Recommends Section of the Film Bazaar 2020. Official selection at the Jogja-NETPAC Asian Film Festival 2021, Indonesia. Entered into the India Gold section of the 22nd Jio MAMI Mumbai Film Festival 2022.	Haobam Paban Kumar
2020	Nakamh-Riangsuanneic	World premiered at the International Folklore Film Festival of Kerala 2021. A Rongmei film.	Kachangthai Gonmei
2021	Eikhoigi Yum	Official selections at the 22nd Jio MAMI Mumbai Film Festival 2022 and 27th International Film Festival of Kerala 2022. Won Best Feature Film in Manipuri at the 69th National Film Awards.	Romi Meitei
2021	Apaiba Leichil	Official selections at the 18th International Film Festival of Thrissur 2023, Kerala and Kashish International Queer Film Festival 2023, Mumbai.	Bobby Wahengbam

== Notable non-feature films: 1972-2022 ==
This section covers notable Manipuri non-feature films released between 9 April 1972 and 9 April 2022, with Maipak: Son of Manipur being the exception in the categorization (released in 1971). Notable films, in this context, include those films which have participated in or won awards in national and international film festivals, and the films which have made history (for example, first full-length film, first filmmaker, first color film, longest movie).

Year of release	Film	Notes	Director
1971	Maipak: Son of Manipur	The first Manipuri documentary film to be screened publicly.	Debkumar Bose
1984	Pebet	Best Short Fiction Film in the International Short Film Festival, Kolkata 1985. Selected for Panorama Section of the International Film Festival of India, New Delhi 1985.	Arambam Lokendra
1989	The Deer on the Lake	Won the National Film Award for Best Environment/Conservation/Preservation Film at the 37th National Film Awards.	Aribam Syam Sharma
1991	Meitei Pung	Won the Special Mention Award at the 39th National Film Awards.	Aribam Syam Sharma
1991	Lai Haraoba	Official selection in the Indian Panorama of the International Film Festival of India (IFFI), 1992.	Aribam Syam Sharma
1993	Orchids of Manipur	Won the Best Environment/Conservation/Preservation Film at the 41st National Film Awards. Screened at the Yamagata International Documentary Film Festival 2019, Japan.	Aribam Syam Sharma
1995	Yelhou Jagoi	Won the National Film Award for Best Anthropological/Ethnographic Film at the 43rd National Film Awards. Screened at the Yamagata International Documentary Film Festival 2019, Japan.	Aribam Syam Sharma
1999	Thang-Ta: The Martial Arts of Manipur	Won the National Film Award for Best Arts/Cultural Film at the 47th National Film Awards.	Aribam Syam Sharma
1999	The Marams	Participated at Indian Panorama of IFFI, 2000; Mumbai International Film Festival 2000 in competition section and Kathmandu International Mountain Film Festival, 2000.	Aribam Syam Sharma
2001	Threads of Life	Official selection at the 7th Mumbai International Film Festival 2002.	Bachaspatimayum Sunzu
2004	Nongdi Tarakkhidare	Selected for Indian Panorama of International Film Festival of India, Goa, 2004.	Ningthouja Lancha
2006	Guru Laimayum Thambalngoubi Devi	Won the National Film Award for Best Biographical Film at the 54th National Film Awards.	Aribam Syam Sharma
2006	Ngaihak Lambida	Got entry into Indian Panorama (non feature section) of the 38th International Film Festival of India 2007. Participated in the Third Eye 6th Asian Film Festival, Mumbai 2007.	Haobam Paban Kumar
2007	Ratan Thiyam: The Man of Theatre	Selected for Indian Panorama of International Film Festival of India, 2008 and 11th Mumbai International Film Festival 2008.	Oken Amakcham; Nirmala Chanu
2007	Rajarshi Bhagyachandra of Manipur	Selection at the Indian Panorama in the non-feature section of IFFI 2007.	Aribam Syam Sharma
2008	AFSPA, 1958	Won the National Film Award for Best Non-Feature Film at the 56th National Film Awards.	Haobam Paban Kumar
2008	Challenge/Singnaba	Won the National Film Award for Exploration & Sports at the 56th National Film Awards.	Sunzu Bachaspatimayum
2008	Sana Keithel	Won the National Film Award for Best Narration/Voice Over at the 56th National Film Awards.	Natasha Elangbam
2008	Nungee Mit	Best Short Film in 2nd Cine ASA International Film Festival 2009, Guwahati. Screened at Asiatica Film Mediale, Rome, Italy, 2009; Mumbai International Film Festival 2010; PLAN 9 Festival of Experimental Movies, Prague, 2011.	Chaoba Thiyam
2009	Mr. India	Won the National Film Award for Best Film on Social Issues at the 57th National Film Awards.	Haobam Paban Kumar
2009	Ilisha Amagi Mahao	Best Director Award in the Cine ASA International Film Festival 2009, Guwahati. Featured in the Indian Panorama of International Film Festival of India, Goa, 2009. Official selection at the 25th Munich International Film Festival 2010.	Ningthouja Lancha
2009	Boiling Blood	Selection at 11th Mumbai International Film Festival (MIFF) 2010.	Khwairakpam Bishwamittra
2009	Roshni	Selection at 11th Mumbai International Film Festival (MIFF) 2010.	Bobby Wahengbam
2009	The Sun is not Still Setting	Selection at 11th Mumbai International Film Festival (MIFF) 2010.	Suvas E.
2010	Heart to Heart	Won the National Film Award for Best Scientific Film at the 58th National Film Awards.	Bachaspatimayum Sunzu
2010	Songs of Mashangva	Won the National Film Award for Best Anthropological/Ethnographic Film on Social Issues at the 58th National Film Awards.	Oinam Doren
2010	The Zeliangrongs	Won Special Mention Award at the 58th National Film Awards.	Ronel Haobam
2010	Cease Baby’s Whimpering Cry	Official selection at Mumbai International Film Festival 2010 and SIGN 2010.	Romi Meitei
2011	The Silent Poet	Won the National Film Award for Best First Non-Feature Film at the 59th National Film Awards Bagged the Best Documentary Award in the 2nd Siliguri International Short & Doc. Film Festival 2011. Official selections at the MIFF 2012, ADDA Film Festival 2013 and Indie 8 Film Festival 2013.	Borun Thokchom
2011	Noong Amadi Yeroom	Official selection in Indian Panorama of the 42nd International Film Festival of India, Mumbai International Film Festival 2012. 2nd Best Film in Manhattan Short Film Festival. Official selection at Beyond Bollywood Festival, Frankfurt.	Romi Meitei
2011	My Grandpa's Home	Screened at the Mumbai International Film Festival 2014. A Poulah film.	Alexander Leo Pou
2012	Manipuri Pony	Won the National Film Award for Best Exploration/Adventure Film (Including sports) at the 60th National Film Awards.	Aribam Syam Sharma
2012	Kaangkhada Lin	Received Best Director & Best Film Awards at Brahmaputra Valley Film Festival (BVFF) 2013 and Mumbai International Film Festival 2014.	Romi Meitei
2013	Karfew	2nd Best Film Award in Brahmaputra Valley Film Festival 2014. Won the 2nd Prize at the National Human Rights Commission (NHRC)'s Short Film Award Competition 2022.	Romi Meitei
2014	Phum Shang	Won the National Film Award for Best Investigative Film at the 62nd National Film Awards. Best Medium Length Film at 18th International Environmental Film & Video Festival, Goias, Brazil 2016.	Haobam Paban Kumar
2015	Auto Driver	Won the National Film Award for Best Film on Social Issues at the 63rd National Film Awards.	Longjam Meena Devi
2015	It's Not My Choice	The first Indian short film to be adapted in Thai language. Won Special Jury Mention and Best Film on Social Cause at the 2015 Highland Independent Film Festival, Shimla. Won Best Filmmaker for a Cause and Best Story at the Jalandhar Short Film Festival 2015. Won Honorable Mention at the Riverdale International Short Film Festival 2017.	Priyakanta Laishram
2015	Eesing gi Machu (Colors of Water)	Best Director and Best Film Awards at Brahmaputra Valley Film Festival 2015 and Mumbai International Film Festival 2016.	Romi Meitei
2016	Ima Sabitri	Bagged the Best Documentary Film Award at the 15th Mumbai International Film Festival. Winner of the Women of the Lens Film Digital Broadcast Festival 2017. Opening Film, Indian Panorama IFFI 2016.	Bobo Khuraijam
2016	Tou-Tai (Seed)	Best Short Film (Golden Royal Bengal Tiger) in the 22nd Kolkata International Film Festival 2016.	Ashok Veilou
2017	Bloody Phanek	Selected for 9th DMZ International Documentary Film Festival 2017, South Korea. Screened at the Ethanografilm Paris Film Festival 2019, France.	Sonia Nepram
2017	Theatre of the Earth	Winner of Satyajit Ray Bronze Award for the 3rd Best Documentary at the 2nd South Asian Short Film Festival.	Oinam Doren
2017	I Am Special	The first English language docu-fiction film made by a Manipuri filmmaker.	Priyakanta Laishram
2018	Look At The Sky	Best Short Fiction Film at the 12th International Documentary and Short Film Festival Kerala, 2019. A Poulah film.	Ashok Veilou
2018	Fireflies	Best Documentary Short at Arthouse Asia International Film Festival 2018. Official selections at Balkan Can Kino 2018, Athens; Kathmandu International Mountain Film Festival 2019.	Johnson Rajkumar
2018	Who Said Boys Can't Wear Makeup?	Won the Best Multimedia Influencer Award at Lifestyle Young Influencer Awards 2018, Mumbai.	Priyakanta Laishram
2018	Pe (The Umbrella)	Won Best Short Film at the Brahmaputra Valley Film Festival 2019.	Rakesh Moirangthem
2018	Daughters of the Polo God	Best Documentary award in the 19th Annual New York Indian Film Festival.	Roopa Barua
2019	I Rise	Best Documentary Award at the Mumbai Short International Film Festival 2020. Best Film on Women and the Outstanding Achievement Awards at the Tagore International Film Festival 2020. Official selection in the 16th International Short and Independent Film Festival, Dhaka 2022 and 17th Mumbai International Film Festival (MIFF) 2022.	Borun Thokchom
2019	The Foul Truth (Amakpa Achumba)	Won Best Actor in a Leading Role at the Symbiosis Allied Media Awards 2019, Critics’ Choice Award for Best Actor In A Leading Role at the Short Motion Pictures National Wave Festival 2018 and Best Film On Other Social Issues at the St. Leuven International Short Film Festival 2019.	Priyakanta Laishram
2019	Motsillaba Mingsel	Won Best Director and Best Child Artist awards at the Cochin International Shortfilm Awards 2021. Official selections at the Lift-Off Global Network Sessions 2021 and the 12th Indian Film Festival of Melbourne 2021. Winner of the Grand Jury Award for Best Film and House of Illusion Award for Best Short Fiction at the Chalachitram National Film Festival 2021. Won the Best Short Film Award at The Himalayan Film Festival 2021.	Romi Meitei
2020	Highways of Life	Got selection at the 51st International Film Festival of India (Indian Panorama) in the non-feature section. Won Best Film Award at the 8th Liberation DocFest, Bangladesh 2020. Official selection at the 13th Festival of Southasian Documentaries 2022, Kathmandu.	Amar Maibam
2021	Pabung Syam	Official selections at the 52nd International Film Festival of India 2021 in the non-feature section of Indian Panorama and 17th Mumbai International Film Festival for Documentary, Short Fiction and Animation films (MIFF) 2022. Winner of Best Biographical Film at the 68th National Film Awards.	Haobam Paban Kumar
2021	Beyond Blast	Won Best Biographical Film at the 69th National Film Awards. Official selection at the 13th Festival of South Asian Documentaries 2022, Kathmandu.	Saikhom Ratan
2021	Spaced Out - Panthung Di Kadaaida!	The first Manipuri film to be dubbed in Punjabi and Haryanvi. Won Best Actor in a Leading Role at the Human Rights & Social Issues Film Festival 2019 in Tokyo, and Best Actor in Drama and Best Screenplay at the Short & Non-Feature Motion Pictures Wave Festival 2020–2021 in Delhi.	Priyakanta Laishram

== Notable feature films: 2022-present ==
This section covers notable Manipuri feature films released since 9 April 2022.

Year of release	Film	Notes	Director
2023	Joseph's Son	Premiered at the 25th Shanghai International Film Festival 2023.	Haobam Paban Kumar
2024	Oneness	The first Manipuri film to address same-sex relationships. World premiered at the KASHISH Pride Film Festival 2024, Mumbai. The first Meitei language film to be officially selected and screened at the Bangalore Queer Film Festival 2024.	Priyakanta Laishram
2024	Boong	Official selection at the Toronto International Film Festival 2024. Won BAFTA Award for Best Children's & Family Film, and became the first Indian film to win a BAFTA.	Lakshmipriya Devi
2024	Langdai Ama	Best Direction award at the 9th Brahmaputra Valley Film Festival 2024.	Binoranjan Oinam
2024	Oitharei	Official selection at the 56th International Film Festival of India in the Indian Panorama section.	Dinesh Naorem
2024	Sunita	Won Best Feature Film in Manipuri at the 72nd National Film Awards.	Ajit Yumnam
2025	Phouoibee	Official selection for Competition on Indian Languages at the 31st Kolkata International Film Festival.	Rakesh Moirangthem
2026	Nashon Pikna	Official Selection in the Indian Cinema Now section at the 31st IFFK 2026.	Romi Meitei

== Notable non-feature films: 2022-present ==
This section covers notable Manipuri non-feature films released since 9 April 2022.

Year of release	Film	Notes	Director
2022	Meiram - The Fire Line	Opening film at the 17th Mumbai International Film Festival for Documentary, Short Fiction and Animation films (MIFF) 2022.	James Khangembam
2022	Lembi Leima	Official selection at the Indian Film Festival of Melbourne 2023.	Mayank Pratap Singh
2022	Padma Shri Wareppa Naba: Rituals to Mainstream	Official selection at the 29th Kolkata International Film Festival.	Bobby Wahengbam
2023	Subedar	Official selection at the Nepal International Film Festival 2023.	Th. Rolivin, G. Devadarshan & A. Debabarta
2023	Andro Dreams	Premiered at the 15th International Documentary and Short Film Festival of Kerala 2023. Opening film at the 54th International Film Festival of India in the Indian Panorama Non-Feature section.	Meena Longjam
2023	Last Meet	Official selection at the 54th International Film Festival of India in the Indian Panorama Non-Feature section.	Waribam Dorendra Singh
2023	Iron Women of Manipur	Premiered at the 15th International Documentary and Short Film Festival of Kerala 2023.	Haobam Paban
2024	Chara Iyong	Screened in the Unheard India (Rare Language) category at the 30th Kolkata International Film Festival 2024.	Ningthouja Lancha
2025	The Silent Performer	Official selection at the 31st Kolkata International Film Festival 2025.	Huidrom Rakesh
2025	Battlefield	Official selection at the 56th International Film Festival of India in the Indian Panorama section and the 19th Mumbai International Film Festival (MIFF).	Borun Thokchom
2026	Story of A Forest	Official selection at the 19th Mumbai International Film Festival 2026 in the National Animation Competition section.	Trishul Yumnam and Yasho Sharma

== See also ==
- Meitei cinema
- Manipur
