= Male cosmetics =

Beauty products intended for male use

Male cosmetics include all cosmetic products marketed towards men, such as makeup, skincare products, hair care products, body care products, sun care products, perfumes, and other decorative cosmetics.

== Historical use of cosmetics ==
As early as 4000 BC, makeup played an important role in ancient Egyptian culture. Men painted black pigments on their eyes to create cat-eye designs that were considered attractive and a symbol of wealth and status. Ancient Egyptians believed that green eye shadow could invoke the god Horus to fight harmful diseases.

Men are known to have used cosmetics in Roman times, although it was frowned upon by society. Men seen carrying mirrors were viewed as effeminate, while those using face-whitening makeup were thought to be immoral because they were expected to be tanned from working outside. Two of the more acceptable practices were the light use of certain perfumes and moderate hair removal. A man removing too much hair was viewed as effeminate, while removing too little made him seem unrefined. The Romans found it especially inappropriate for an emperor to be vain, as was apparently the case with the Emperor Otho. The Emperor Elagabalus removed all of his body hair and often donned makeup, which caused the Romans much grief.

During the reign of Queen Elizabeth I, cosmetics were very popular among men, as they valued ghostly, powdered skin. In this era, due to the chemical makeup of the substances used, cosmetics often caused serious health problems, including premature death.

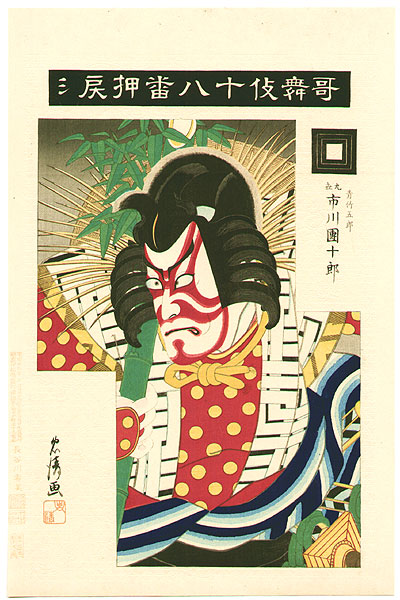
Japanese woodblock print by Torii Tadakiyo depicting an actor in kumadori kabuki makeup.

With the advent of modern film making in the United States in the 1930s, men's hair and cosmetics re-emerged in the public eye. However, men's beauty products were relatively non-existent on the market until the end of the 1990s. Only a few brands were interested in producing men's cosmetics because it was regarded as a niche market. Male cosmetics are not as widely accepted as female cosmetics; only 17% of men think that makeup products are important in daily life. Nevertheless, 97% of men use skincare products.

=== Kabuki ===
Kabuki is a traditional Japanese art performance. It involves elaborately designed costumes, eye-catching makeup, outlandish wigs and exaggerated actions performed by the actors. Kabuki was originally performed by women but beginning in 1629, only male actors were permitted to perform kabuki. Kabuki actors apply oil and wax to their faces to help cosmetics stick to the skin. Then they put on a thick white cosmetic called oshiroi that covers their entire face. Oshiroi is made of rice flour and uses slightly different shades of white depending on the age, type, and gender of the character. On a cosmetically made white face, red and black lines are used to outline the eyes and mouth. Different shapes are used for male and female characters.

For certain characters, there is a special makeup style called kumadori. Kumadori consists of dramatic lines and shapes of different colors, each representing a different emotional quality. The most commonly used colors are dark red, representing anger, passion or cruelty, and dark blue for sadness or depression. Other common colors are pink, representing youth or happiness; light blue or green, representing calmness; purple, for the aristocracy, and brown for selfishness. There are about a hundred different mask-like kumadori makeup styles.

== Male consumers of cosmetics ==
=== Age group ===
Aside from traditional use and use in the arts, research shows that young men who are between 18 and 34 years old are more likely to use cosmetics.

=== Males using cosmetics ===
Male cosmetics were originally targeted towards homosexual men, however, market research revealed that only a third of male cosmetic consumers were gay. Some men use beauty products to cover perceived flaws on their faces, such as acne marks and freckles. Additionally, some men use cosmetics to boost their physical appearance.

Makeup is frequently used by male stage performers and movie actors. Intensive makeup might be used to produce a zombie-effect, aging or other special effects, for a movie. Although using makeup can be time-intensive, it saves time and cost compared to the use of computer-driven special effects and can be more visually appealing to the audience.

With the number of aging populations around the world continually increasing, older men are also turning towards cosmetics to slow the appearance of physical aging effects. Many of these effects include wrinkles, age spots, dry skin, uneven skin tone, and even hair damage; the appearance of all of these can be reduced by the use of cosmetics.

== Branding and packaging of male cosmetics ==
Several cosmetics and skincare brands have developed products specifically for men's skin, such as Nivea, Chanel, Tom Ford, and Adidas. Nivea is the most popular brand for men with 34.4%, followed by L’Oréal with 21.9%.

The packaging of male cosmetics is generally simple. The colors are mainly blue, green, grey, white or black. Compared to women's cosmetics, there are fewer bright colors such as pink, red and purple. These design choices aim to attract male customers, whilst reducing the resistance of male customers to cosmetics, breaking the belief that cosmetics are for women only.

Also, cosmetics companies produce cosmetics tailored to the preferences of men in different regions. For example, Revlon has launched a Middle Eastern collection, and Ferrari has developed a traditional Middle Eastern fragrance, taking into account local consumer preferences.

== Men working in the cosmetics industry ==
=== Gender balance in the cosmetics industry ===
Although most cosmetics consumers are women, the majority of executives within cosmetics companies are men. Many large beauty companies have few female representatives on their boards or senior management teams. For instance, the leadership team of the cosmetics giant Revlon, as well as the leadership team of Bath and Body Works and the luxury goods group LVMH (with brands such as Makeup For Ever, Fresh and Benefit Cosmetics), consist mainly of males. In comparison, the board of Estée Lauder is almost balanced, but the number of women in administrative positions throughout the company is relatively small. Overall, women account for 34% of the board of directors of personal care companies and 24% of all executive positions. While this ratio may be more equitable than other industries, it is not yet reflective of the cosmetics market or society at large.

=== Male cosmetics bloggers and celebrities ===
The number of male beauty bloggers on YouTube is also growing. Makeup male bloggers will evaluate cosmetics and provide makeup tutorials and advertise products. The most famous male beauty bloggers in the United States are Patrick Starr and James Charles. French influencer Bach Buquen also rose to popularity in 2024 for his videos featuring him putting on makeup in public.

One of the most prominent male cosmetic celebrities is a Chinese streamer named Li Jiaqi. Jiaqi tests lipsticks and analyses the colour and texture of each lipstick for a large audience. On November 11, 2018, Li Jiaqi sold lipsticks live, selling 15,000 units in five minutes.

== Men’s cosmetic market size and growth ==
When compared to other industries, the global cosmetics and beauty products industry is rather impervious to economic depression or expansion. Economic ups and downs have affected trends within the global industry in recent years; however, the sales volume has maintained relatively constant. In the case of a recession, the sales of cosmetics are generally maintained at a certain steady floor. In 2017, the global cosmetics market value was US$523.43 billion. It is expected to reach a market value of US$805.61 billion by 2023 and a compound annual growth rate of 7.14% from 2018 to 2023. The increase in male beauty awareness is a major factor driving the growth of the global market.

During the period from 2018 to 2023, the global men's beauty products market is expected to grow at a rate of 5.23%.

== See also ==
- Cosmetics policy
