= The Sangai Express =

Indian English Daily newspaper

The Sangai Express is a daily newspaper based in Imphal published in English and Meiteilon (Manipuri) languages. The English language newspaper has circulation of 27,513 copies. The Meitei language version is the largest circulated newspaper in that language. Politician Sapam Nishikant Singh is the newspaper's publisher.
