= Marup (newspaper) =

Indian Meitei language newspaper

Marup (Meitei: /ma-rūp/)
- Type: daily & weekly
- Founded: 1969
- Language: Meitei language (officially called Manipuri language)
- Headquarters: Agartala
- City: Agartala
- Country: India
- Circulation: India, Bangladesh and Myanmar
- Sister newspapers: Marup (Bengali edition)

Marup (Meitei for 'friend') is an Indian Meitei language newspaper, (Note: also published in Bengali) circulated mainly in the Northeast Indian state of Tripura. It started its publication works in the year 1969. It is published in Agartala. It is recognised by the Information and Cultural Department of the Government of Tripura.

== Circulation and writing system ==
Besides its circulation in India, it is also circulated in the Manipuri populated areas of Bangladesh and Myanmar. It uses the Bengali script for writing the Meitei language. However, it doesn't have any faculties for printing in Meitei script as of 2022. R.K. Kalyanjit (Meitei: ꯔꯥꯖꯀꯨꯃꯥꯔ ꯀꯜꯌꯥꯟꯖꯤꯠ), the editor of Marup, while giving an interview, told that the reason for not printing in Meitei script is because there is no scope for teaching the script to Meitei language speakers in Bangladesh and Myanmar.

== Contents ==
In the 2023 Manipur violence, the Marup (Meitei: ꯃꯔꯨꯞ) raised its voice regarding the sufferings of the people in the state of Manipur and highlighted the past related incidents happened in the history of Manipur.

== Events ==
The Marup also celebrated the Patriots' Day (Meitei: ꯑꯊꯧꯕꯁꯤꯡꯒꯤ ꯅꯨꯃꯤꯠ), organised by the Manipuri Literary and Cultural Forum, Tripura and Meira Paibi (Meitei: ꯃꯩꯔꯥ ꯄꯥꯏꯕꯤ), held at the Paona Brajabasi Park, Khowai Meitei village, Gouranagar, Tripura.

== See also ==
- Hueiyen Lanpao
- Imphal Free Press
- Naharolgi Thoudang
- Poknapham
- Sanaleibak (newspaper)
- The Sangai Express
- List of Meitei-language newspapers
