= Sanaleibak (newspaper) =

Indian Meitei language daily newspaper

Sanaleibak Sanaleibak Daily
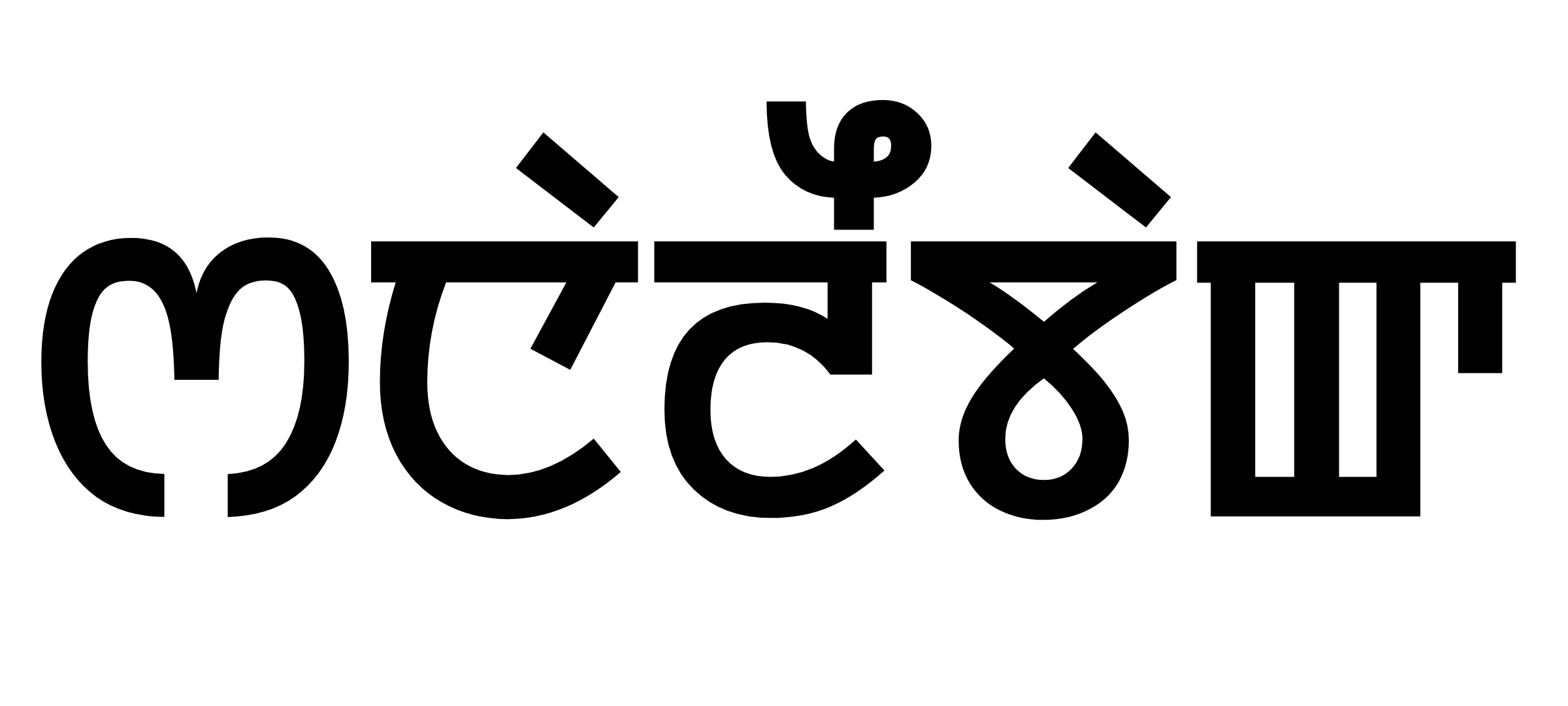
- Type: daily newspaper
- Format: paper and e-paper (Note: online webpages are availed.)
- Editor: Nimol Ningombam
- Language: Meitei language (officially called Manipuri language)
- City: Imphal
- Country: India
- Circulation: India (physical copy); global (e-copy)
- Website: sanaleibak.in

The Sanaleibak (Meitei: /sa-nā-lei-bāk/, lit. 'the golden land'), also known as the Sanaleibak Daily, is an Indian Meitei language daily newspaper, circulated mainly in the Northeast Indian state of Manipur.

== In the Manipur State Journalists Award 2022 ==
In the Manipur State Journalists Award 2022, out of the 8 award categories given by the Department of Information & Public Relations, Government of Manipur on the National Press Day, Sanaleibak daily won 7 awards simultaneously. The winners of the awards are as follows:

1. Ningombam Hemantakumar was awarded for the best editor on National Integration & Communal Harmony.
2. Moirangthem Khagemba Meetei was awarded for the best reporting on Public Health & Hygiene.
3. Moirangthem Khagemba Meetei was again awarded for the best reporting on rural topics.
4. Robinson Wahengbam was awarded for the best reporting on Art & Culture.
5. Taorem Bishwajit Singh was awarded for the best reporting on parliamentary topics.
6. Maibam Kenedy Singh was awarded for the best reporting on Science & Technology
7. Rabi Takhellambam was awarded for the best reporting on Women and Children.

== In the Manipur State Journalists Award 2020 ==
In the Manipur State Journalists Award 2020, out of the 8 award categories given by the Department of Information & Public Relations, Government of Manipur on the National Press Day, Sanaleibak daily won 5 awards simultaneously. The winners of the awards are as follows:

1. Ningombam Hemantakumar was awarded for being the Best Editor.
2. Khagembam Shanker Singh was awarded for the best reporting on Science & Technology.
3. Ngangom Suraj Kumar Singh was awarded for the best reporting with special Reference to Women and Children.
4. Maibam Kenedy Singh was awarded for the best reporting on Art and Culture.
5. Khagembam Rabikumar Meitei was awarded for the best reporting on Sports.

== See also ==
- Hueiyen Lanpao
- Imphal Free Press
- List of Meitei-language newspapers
- Naharolgi Thoudang
- Poknapham
- Sangai Express
