= Sanaleipak (disambiguation) =

Sanaleipak is a Meitei language term and a concept in Meitei philosophy about perfectionism.

Sanaleipak (or Sanaleibak or Sana Leibak) may also refer to:

- Sana Leibak Manipur, a Meitei language song, which serves as the official state song of Manipur
- Sanaleipak Nachom, a Meitei cultural association of artists of Shumang Kumhei art form
- Sanaleibak (newspaper), a Meitei language daily newspaper
