= Moirangthem Inao =

Indian playwright from Manipur

- Born: Moirangthem Inao; 11 October 1945; Lamdeng Khunou, Manipur; Present address: Uripok Ningthoukhongjam Leikai, Imphal, Manipur
- Education: M.A. (Manipuri), Manipur University
- Occupations: Playwright, Lyricist, Poet, Producer, Director
- Parent(s): Moirangthem Tondon; Moirangthem Ongbi R.K. Ramanisana

Moirangthem Inao is an Indian playwright, lyricist, producer and director from Imphal, Manipur. He has scripted around 90 plays and most of them are popular radio plays aired on All India Radio, Imphal. Inao has also directed famous Manipuri movies like Nongallabasu Thaballei Manam and Laang. The dialogues from his radio plays have a unique charm and are famous among the radio play lovers of Manipur.

Inao was an editor of the journal Athouba. He produced movies under his home production Tondon Films. He bagged the Best Story and Special Jury awards at the 3rd Sahitya Seva Samiti MANIFA 2014 for the film Abem.

== Early life and education ==
Born as youngest son among seven siblings, Inao began his schooling from Uripok Boys' School and Uripok Eigya Pishak Mandav school where he studied from I to VIII standard. In 1963, he passed Matriculation from Tombisana High School. He completed graduation from D.M. College in Political Science in 1967. He studied Law for sometime but could not complete the course due to some personal problems. After passing graduation, he went to Kashmir for further studies in 1971 but returned home without completing studies. Finally, he completed master's degree from Manipur University in Manipuri. His family shifted to Uripok Ningthoukhongjam Leikai during Second World War, locally known as Japan Laan in Manipur.

== Career ==
He started writing poetry and short stories since his IX standard. He started scripting radio plays for All India Radio in June–July 1978. His first radio play is Ahing Ama. Most of his plays aired on All India Radio, Imphal are well received by the radio listeners of Manipur. Among them, Chatledo Eidi Meigee Ching Puduna, Nongallabasu Thaballei Manam, Anuradhapur Ashramgee Rajkumar, Ingengi Aitya may be mentioned. His radio play Marup Ani was translated into Hindi and aired on Akashvani All India Radio as Do Dost.

His radio play Chatledo Eidi Meigee Ching Puduna was made into a movie by Makhonmani Mongsaba and titled as Chatledo Eidi. It won the National Film Award for Best Feature Film in Manipuri at the 48th National Film Awards and was selected for Indian Panorama of IFFI 2001. Makhonmani Mongsaba also directed Yenning Amadi Likla, a 2007 movie and scripted by Moirangthem Inao. It got selection in Indian Panorama of the 39th International Film Festival of India 2008. The renowned filmmakers of Manipur have also made many feature films scripted by Inao. Ingengi Atiya, Lallibadi Eini, Angangba Kurao Mapal, Inga Nonglakta, Kekoo Lotpee and Pankhei are such of his films.

In January 2026, his radio play U Thaba Angaoba was staged as a theatrical play by Phambak Shaktam Langba Leepun, Keinou in connection with 24th Rupmahal Artistes' Memorial Drama Festival 2025-26. For it, he won the Best Script award at the festival.

== Selected radio plays ==
- Ahing Ama
- Thengnakhidraba Mikup
- Tamnaba
- Nongallabasu Thaballei Manam
- Chatledo Eidi Meigee Ching Puduna
- Ingengi Atiya
- Lam Nganu
- Aong Aoon
- Khongul
- Ashi Heibong
- Anuradhapur Ashramgee Rajkumar
- Ekai Hangoidana Hairaba Ekum Thani Go! Go!
- Nungaiba
- Nirupama
- Yaroi Yaroi
- Bonsai
- Keidoungei Loigani Imunggi Lanjao
- U Thaba Angaoba

== Selected filmography ==
Year	Film	Role
1994	Kwa Matap	Script Writer
2000	Chatledo Eidi	Script Writer
2002	Lallashi Pal	Script Writer, Lyricist
2002	Ingengi Atiya (The Sky of Autumn)	Script Writer
2003	Teina Onnaba	Script Writer
2004	Angangba Kurao Mapal	Script Writer
2004	Lallibadi Eini	Script Writer
2005	Nongallabasu Thaballei Manam	Script Writer, Lyricist, Director
2005	Laang	Script Writer, Director
2005	Khanthahouda Mikup	Script Writer, Director
2006	Leichil Nongphai Chatkharo	Script writer, Lyricist, Producer, Director
2006	Inga Nonglakta	Script Writer
2006	Ngamna Ngamnaba	Script Writer, Director
2007	Yenning Amadi Likla	Script writer, Lyricist
2008	Kekoo Lotpee	Story writer
2008	Amuktangdi Uning-Ee	Story writer, Direction
2013	Abem	Story writer, Lyrics, Direction
2014	Nungshibagi Laman	Screenplay, Direction
2015	Pankhei	Script writer
2016	Pakhatli	Script writer
2016	Henna Nungaijei	Script writer
