= Nongallabasu Thaballei Manam =

2005 Manipuri film

Nong-Ngallabasu Thaballei Manam
- Movie Poster
- Directed by: Moirangthem Inao
- Written by: Moirangthem Inao
- Produced by: Monasi
- Starring: Nityaibi; Laimayum Gaitri; Thingom Pritam; Manda Leima
- Cinematography: Radhamohon
- Edited by: Denny R.K.
- Music by: Sagolsem Tijendra
- Production company: Tondon Films
- Distributed by: Tondon Films
- Release date: 2005
- Running time: 125 minutes
- Country: India
- Language: Meiteilon (Manipuri)

Nongallabasu Thaballei Manam (English: Lingering Fragrance) is a 2005 Manipuri film written and directed by Moirangthem Inao and produced by Monasi, under the banner of Tondon Films. It stars Nityaibi, Laimayum Gaitri, Thingom Pritam and Manda Leima in the lead roles. It is based on the famous radio play of the same title.

In the radio play, the roles of R.K. Manisana and Phajabi are played by the renowned actors Ningthoukhongjam Medhajeet and Thongam Thoithoi respectively. The dialogues from the play are still fondly remembered by the radio play lovers of Manipur. In the movie, Nityaibi's voice is dubbed by Ningthoukhongjam Medhajeet.

== Plot ==
Heinou and Urirei are lovebirds. They happen to elope one day. Manisana, Heinou's father, is apprehensive about the family's consent of Urirei as his son is not qualified enough whereas Urirei is a doctor. Apart from it, Manisana has other reasons. When enquired by Surbala, his wife, he narrates his past life of a bachelor.

Manisana and Phajabi (Urirei's mother) grew up in the same locality. Phajabi loved Manisana, whom she lovingly addressed as Yambung. She was caring, sweet and child-like. On the contrary, Manisana loved Tamphasana, a lady from the neighbouring village. He always took Phajabi's love for granted and teased her all the time. As time passed by, Phajabi's hope to win Manisana's heart withered away. He went to Imphal for further studies and Phajabi got engaged to a guy from Imphal.

Unlike Manisana and Phajabi's mismatch, Urirei and Heinou have a happy union.

== Cast ==
- Nityaibi as R.K. Manisana
- Laimayum Gaitri as Phajabi
- Thingom Pritam as R.K. Heinou
- Manda Leima as Dr. Urirei
- Sagolsem Dhanamanjuri as Surbala, Manisana's wife
- Khoibam Homeshwori as Tamphasana's friend
- Ronita
- Ibomcha
- Narmada
- Haridas
- James
- Indira
- Romi

== Soundtrack ==
Sagolsem Tijendra composed the soundtrack for the film and Makhonmani Mongsaba and Moirangthem Inao wrote the lyrics. The movie has four songs sung by Sonali Mukherjee, Sagolsem Tijendra, Maibam Roshibina and Dinesh Sharma.

Nong-Ngallabasu Thaballei Manam

Soundtrack album by Sonali Mukherjee, Sagolsem Tijendra, Maibam Roshibina, Dinesh Sharma
- Released: 2005
- Studio: Mayum Network
- Genre: Feature film soundtrack
- Length: 19:03
- Label: Tondon Films
- Producer: Monasi

No.	Title	Singer(s)	Length
1.	"Nahaktagi Khanbada"	Sagolsem Tijendra	05:35
2.	"Haibiyu Nakhoi Haibiyu"	Sonali Mukherjee	04:55
3.	"Ngaohalle Nasaktuna"	Dinesh Sharma, Sonali Mukherjee	04:11
4.	"Lonthoktaba Thamoigee Wahang"	Maibam Roshibina	04:22
Total length:			19:03
