= Chinglen Thiyam =

Shumang Leela artist, comedian, lyricist, and director (1950–2020)

- Chinglen Thiyam during a Shumang Leela (Salam Lincoln Photography)
- Born: 1 March 1950; Konthoujam Makha Leikai, Manipur
- Died: 18 June 2020 (aged 70); Nambol Khabi, Bishnupur District, Manipur
- Occupations: Actor; Comedian; Lyricist; Director
- Parent(s): Thiyam Babu; Thiyam Ongbi Merajaobi
- Awards: Senior Fellowship, Manipur State Kala Akademi (2015); Iboyaima Shumang Leela Award (2020)

Chinglen Thiyam (1 March 1950 - 18 June 2020) was an actor, comedian, lyricist and director of Shumang Kumhei theatre in Manipur. He had acted in over 100 plays and directed around 20 plays. Thiyam had also acted in many Manipuri films. He was popularly known as Commando Chinglen from the Shumang Leela Thawaina Punshigidamak. Not only in digital films, but he had also acted in Manipuri celluloid movies. He was conferred with the Iboyaima Shumang Leela Award in 2020 for his profound contribution in Shumang Leela. Wari Loidri, Khomlang Laman, Thawaina Punshigidamak, Sanagi Nga, Keishamthong Thoibi were some of the famous plays where he acted.

== Career ==
From 1972 onwards, while studying at Imphal College, he joined theatre classes in Chorus Repertory Theatre, Aryan Theatre and Rupmahal Theatre under the guidance of renowned theatre personalities like Ratan Thiyam and Lokendra Arambam.

Chinglen Thiyam started his career in Shumang Leela playing antagonistic characters. Later, he became a popular comedian whom every Shumang Leela lovers looked up to. He was popular as Commando Chinglen for playing the role of an aggressive police in the play Thawaina Punshigidamak. He played a Maiba in the third installment of Maibido Maibado Mapuroibado and he himself directed the play. His portrayal of an orthodox Brahmin in the play Keishamthong Thoibi was well received by the audiences. The play was made into a movie by O. Gautam in 2008 and Thiyam played the same role in the film as well. Some of the Shumang Leela associations where he joined were Naharol Khongthang Artistes' Association, Sangai Artistes' Association and Iramdam Manipur Artistes' Association (IMAA). IMAA's 2020 play Nacha Lanjare Ima was his last Shumang Leela.

Thiyam was an approved artiste of All India Radio, Imphal. He had also acted in Manipuri films. To name a few, Meiree, Heinoujom Yumbal Tellanga Yahip, Keishamthong Thoibi and Meefu Leikai may be mentioned. In 1998 movie Meiree, he portrayed the role of Gogo Commando. He had starred in a 2019 music video titled Ayukkina Korou Oirambee directed by Rajen Leishangthem.

== Accolades ==
Chinglen Thiyam was conferred with the Senior Fellowship 2015 in Shumang Leela by Manipur State Kala Akademi. He also won the Best Lyricist Award 2015 in the Manipur State Shumang Leela Festival organised by Manipur State Kala Akademi. In 2014, he received the Neta Irabot Leelaroi Lifetime Mana (Shumang Leela) at the MANIFA 2014 organised by Sahitya Seva Samiti, Kakching. He won the Iboyaima Shumang Leela Award in 2020.

== Selected Shumang Leelas ==
- Hingbagi Mamal
- Thawaina Punshigidamak
- Khomlang Laman
- 21st Century gee Kunti
- 21st Century gee Kunti-2
- Phijigee Mani (21st Century gee Kunti-3)
- Keishamthong Thoibi
- Nongoubee
- Naitom Satpi
- Eyaithakki Thambal
- Mani Mangkhraba Manipur (Maibido Maibado Mapuroibado 3)
- Sanaleibakki Sanatombi
- Koklaroidaba Peepham
- Leikaigi Sambal
- Sanagi Nga
- Yukhal Marumda (Sanagi Nga 2)
- Haigat Lang (Sanagi Nga 3)
- Wari Loidri
- Ngaikhini (Wari Loidri 2)
- Nipal Suba Mapok (Wari Loidri 3)
- Nungshibagidamak
- Chakpa Makhao Ngambi
- Professor
- Suti Loidri
- Pakhang No. 1
- Kombeerei
- Huranbi Nungshibi
- Thawaigi Thawai
- Nungshibagi Machu
- Nacha Lanjare Ima

== Selected filmography ==
Year	Film	Director
1998	Meiree	L. Surjakanta
2004	Hi Sweety Hello Preety	Chan Heisnam
2004	Reporter	L. Surjakanta
2005	Sagatluba Manglan	Chan Heisnam
2007	Yenning Amadi Likla	Makhonmani Mongsaba
2008	Keishamthong Thoibi	O. Gautam
2009	Heinoujom Yumbal Tellanga Yahip	Suvas E.
2012	Makar	Sarungbam Beeren
2014	Eengengee Neeni Panba	Geetchandra Chongtham
2015	Hawker	Suvas E.
2015	Nungshit Mapi	Ajit Ningthouja
2016	Thaba	Devbrata Samurai & Dpak Manohar
2017	Meefu Leikai	Bimol Phibou
2018	Leishabigee Macha	Jeetendra Ningomba
2018	Nang Ei	Surjit Khuman
