= Nongphadok Lakpa Atithi =

- Official Poster
- Directed by: Aribam Syam Sharma
- Written by: M. K. Binodini Devi & Lamabam Viramani
- Screenplay by: Aribam Syam Sharma
- Story by: Lamabam Viramani
- Produced by: Deepak Sarmah
- Starring: Ningthoujam Rina; Lairenjam Olen
- Cinematography: Irom Maipak
- Edited by: Gurumayum Ashutosh
- Music by: Aribam Syam Sharma
- Production company: Aribam Syam Sharma Production
- Distributed by: Programme Production Centre (NE), Doordarshan Guwahati
- Release date: 1 November 2019
- Running time: 74 minutes
- Country: India
- Language: Meiteilon (Manipuri)

Nongphadok Lakpa Atithi (English: The Guest) is a 2019 Manipuri film directed by Aribam Syam Sharma and produced by Deepak Sarmah. It stars Ningthoujam Rina and Lairenjam Olen in the lead roles. The film was premiered at the 3rd Guwahati International Film Festival 2019 as the Opening Film of the Indian section. It is based on Lamabam Viramani's short story Atithi. It was written as a radio play by M. K. Binodini Devi under the title Nongphadok Lakpada. The adapted screenplay of the film was done by Aribam Syam Sharma. It won four awards at the 13th Manipur State Film Festival 2020.

Nongphadok Lakpa Atithi was also the opening film at the 12th International Guwahati Film Festival 2020. It got official selection at the 5th North-East Film Festival, Pune (Fragrances from the North-East).

== Plot ==
Tamubi had determined not to visit her estranged husband. Not even once in their twelve years of separation. But one day, all against herself, she visits to attend her daughter's wedding. She yielded to her daughter's persistence. When she arrives, the estranged couple did not exchange a single word. As night falls after the ceremony, Tamubi has no choice but to hold the night at her husband's place. Reminiscence of the years gone by keep awake the separated husband and wife the whole night. The following day her husband pleads her to come back and start life anew. But Tamubi sticks to her independent conscience.

== Cast ==
- Ningthoujam Rina as Tamubi
- Lairenjam Olen as Ibohal
- Kangabam Tomba as Mamma
- Redy Yumnam as Bijoy
- Chingtham Sarmila as Manimacha
- Yengkhom Roma as Angangjaobi
- Priyatama Aribam as Ebemnungsi

== Accolades ==
Nongphadok Lakpa Atithi won four awards at the 13th Manipur State Film Awards 2020.

Award	Category	Winner's name	Result
13th Manipur State Film Awards 2020	Best Director	Aribam Syam Sharma	Won
13th Manipur State Film Awards 2020	Best Screenplay (Adapted)	Aribam Syam Sharma	Won
13th Manipur State Film Awards 2020	Best Cinematography	Irom Maipak	Won
13th Manipur State Film Awards 2020	Best Audiography (Location sound recordist for sync sound films only)	Ph. Shananda Sharma & Ramakanta Thingbaijam	Won
