= 48th National Film Awards =

Film awards in India

- Awarded for: Best of Indian cinema in 2000
- Awarded by: Directorate of Film Festivals
- Presented by: K. R. Narayanan (President of India)
- Announced on: 27 March 2001
- Presented on: 12 December 2001
- Site: Vigyan Bhawan, New Delhi
- Official website: dff.nic.in

Highlights
- Best Feature Film: Shantham
- Best Non-Feature Film: Rasikpriya
- Best Book: Sholay: The Making of a Classic
- Best Film Critic: • Vasiraju Prakasam • Suresh Sharma
- Dadasaheb Phalke Award: Asha Bhosle
- Most awards: Bharathi (4)

The 48th National Film Awards, which was presented by Directorate of Film Festivals, was set up in by the Ministry of Information and Broadcasting, India to acknowledge the achievements of Indian Cinema released in the year of 2000 (although some 2001 films were awarded). The ceremony took place on 12th December 2001 and the awards were given by the then-President of India, K. R. Narayanan.

== Awards ==
Awards were divided into three categories as feature films, non-feature films, and books written on Indian cinema.

=== Lifetime Achievement Award ===
Name of Award	Image	Awardee(s)	Awarded As	Awards
Dadasaheb Phalke Award		Asha Bhosle	Playback Singer	Swarna Kamal, ₹ 100,000 and a Shawl

=== Feature films ===
Feature films were awarded at an all-India as well as regional level. For the 48th National Film Awards, a Malayalam film, Shantham won the National Film Award for Best Feature Film; a Tamil film, Bharathi won the maximum number of awards (4). Following were the awards given in each category:

==== Juries ====
A committee headed by Vyjayanthimala was appointed to evaluate the feature films awards. Following were the jury members:

- Jury Members
  - Vyjayanthimala (Chairperson) • Chitra Desai • Dhritiman Chatterjee • Hariharan • Keyaar • R. Lakshman • Madhumita Raut • Mac Mohan • Nibedita Pradhan • Parvathi Indusekhar • Pawan Kumar • Sonali Kotnis • Shashi Ranjan • Sushant Mishra • Tarun Vijay

==== All India Award ====
Following awards were given:

===== Golden Lotus Award =====
Official Name: Swarna Kamal

All the awardees are awarded with 'Golden Lotus Award (Swarna Kamal)', a certificate and cash prize.

Name of Award	Name of Film	Language	Awardee(s)	Cash prize
Best Feature Film	Shantham	Malayalam	Producer: P. V. Gangadharan director: Jayaraj	₹ 50,000/- Each
Best Feature Film	Citation: For addressing the very contemporary issue of political rivalry and violence in our society in an unusually imaginative way. The language of the film goes beyond conventional narrative for appeal to calmness and good sense.			
Best Debut Film of a Director	Sayahnam	Malayalam	Producer: M. S. Nazeer; Director: R. Sarath	₹ 25,000/- Each
Best Debut Film of a Director	Citation: For the nature and gripping manner in which this young director deals with complex issues like political honesty and nuclear disarmament.			
Best Popular Film Providing Wholesome Entertainment	Vaanathaippola	Tamil	Producer: V. Ravichandran; Director: Vikraman	₹ 40,000/- Each
Best Popular Film Providing Wholesome Entertainment	Citation: For its sincere projection of the values of a joint family and the need to share good and difficult times together.			
Best Children's Film	Gharaksharangal	Malayalam	Producer: Salim Padiyath; Director: Salim Padiyath	₹ 30,000/- Each
Best Children's Film	Citation: For depicting, through the eyes of a child love and respect for our mother tongue and culture tackling many social issues pertaining to education, agriculture and general empowerment, for a civic society.			
Best Direction	Utsab	Bengali	Rituparno Ghosh	₹ 50,000/-
Best Direction	Citation: For working with a large group of actors within the confines of a rambling old house. The director builds an unpretentious, gripping and entirely credible narrative and brings about in the process some extremely powerful performances.			

===== Silver Lotus Award =====
Official Name: Rajat Kamal

All the awardees are awarded with 'Silver Lotus Award (Rajat Kamal)', a certificate and cash prize.

Name of Award	Name of Film	Language	Awardee(s)	Cash prize
Best Feature Film on National Integration	Pukar	Hindi	Producer: Surinder Kapoor; Director: Rajkumar Santoshi	₹ 30,000/- Each
Best Feature Film on National Integration	Citation: For tackling the problem of terrorist infiltrations and the army's counter attacks. And situations where armed and civilian forces unite against the common external enemy.			
Best Film on Family Welfare	Kal Kaa Aadmi	Hindi	Producer: Ministry of Health and Family Welfare; Director: Amol Palekar	₹ 30,000/- Each
Best Film on Family Welfare	Citation: For telling the story of Raghunath Karve, who, early in this century, pioneered the debate on sexual and reproductive rights. The film recreates the period in painstaking detail and helps to raise consciousness about issues which are extremely relevant today.			
Best Film on Other Social Issues	Vetri Kodi Kattu	Tamil	Producer: D. Pandian; Director: Cheran	₹ 30,000/- Each
Best Film on Other Social Issues	Citation: For discussing issues on migration from one's own land and the social implications that follow, in the heart land of Tamilnadu, highlighting the need to re-establish the holistic culture of society .			₹ 30,000/- Each
Best Film on Other Social Issues	Munnudi	Kannada	Producer: Navachitra; Director: P. Sheshadri	₹ 30,000/- Each
Best Film on Other Social Issues	Citation: For attempting to discuss the misuse of Shariat by opportunistic men and the manipulation of the testaments on "Nikah" and "Talaaq".			₹ 30,000/- Each
Best Film on Environment / Conservation / Preservation	Oru Cheru Punchiri	Malayalam	Producer: Jisha John; Director: M. T. Vasudevan Nair	₹ 30,000/- Each
Best Film on Environment / Conservation / Preservation	Citation: For telling the simple and moving story of an elderly couple and their relationship with the world around them. In depicting the couple's love for the trees and plants in their garden, the film spreads the message of environmental conservation in the broadest sense in a gentle, unobtrusive way.			
Best Actor	Pukar	Hindi	Anil Kapoor	₹ 10,000/-
Best Actor	Citation: For his role in the film. A veteran actor of great versatility, meets the varied demands of this role with credibility and assured technical skill.			
Best Actress	Daman: A Victim of Marital Violence	Hindi	Raveena Tandon	₹ 10,000/-
Best Actress	Citation: For a portrayal of a submissive woman who is subjected to constant physical and psychological torture by her husband. The character comes out of her passive shroud fearing her daughter may suffer the same fate as her.			
Best Supporting Actor	Munnudi	Kannada	H. G. Dattatreya	₹ 10,000/-
Best Supporting Actor	Citation: For his portrayal of Hasanabba. He is an agent who procures local girls for arabs to marry in an impoverished village in Karnataka. H. G. Dattatreya brings a wonderful sensitivity to the character, without turning it into a stereotypical villain.			
Best Supporting Actress	Shantham	Malayalam	K. P. A. C. Lalitha	₹ 10,000/-
Best Supporting Actress	Citation: For the role of Narayani in the film. Narayani is an elderly mother whose son has been killed in political violence. In the course of the film, she is transformed, gently and unobtrusiveuly into a crusade for peace. Lalitha brings great professional skills and sensitivity to the role.			
Best Child Artist	Nila Kaalam	Tamil	Udayaraj	₹ 10,000/-
Best Child Artist	Citation: For his portrayal of Pulli in the film. Pulli is a very young orphan who works in a motor garage in chennai. The jury applauds the way in which master udayaraj brings out both the innocence and street – smartness of Pulli, with a combination of energy and spontaneity.			
Best Male Playback Singer	Kandukondain Kandukondain ("Enna Solla Pogirai")	Tamil	Shankar Mahadevan	₹ 10,000/-
Best Male Playback Singer	Citation: For the soulful rendering of the song.			
Best Female Playback Singer	Bharathi ("Mayil Pola Ponnu Onnu")	Tamil	Bhavatharini	₹ 10,000/-
Best Female Playback Singer	Citation: For the song which is outstanding because it depicts the velvet voice of the diva.			
Best Cinematography	Moksha	Hindi	Cameraman: Ashok Mehta; Laboratory Processing: Prasad Film Laboratory	₹ 10,000/- Each
Best Cinematography	Citation: For providing wide range of tonal variation and outstanding compositions to cater to the changing moods of the film's narrative.			
Best Screenplay	Kadal Pookkal	Tamil	Bharathiraja	₹ 10,000/-
Best Screenplay	Citation: For focusing, in present times of degeneration, on love, sacrifice and family values.			
Best Audiography	Moksha	Hindi	Anup Dev	₹ 10,000/-
Best Audiography	Citation: The audiographer has, with extreme care, chosen the right sound, ambience and layered the tracks in an immaculate way to create an atmosphere to support the narrative of the film.			
Best Editing	Snip!	English	• Suresh Pai • Apurva Asrani	₹ 10,000/-
Best Editing	Citation: For creating an evocative rhythm in the film enhancing the pace of the narrative while aesthetically maintaining the unit of form and content.			
Best Art Direction	Bharathi	Tamil	P. Krishnamoorthy	₹ 10,000/-
Best Art Direction	Citation: For aesthetically recreating the period of early twentieth century taking great care in selecting authentic properties of the time to enhance the décor of both interiors as well as exteriors, thus bringing alive Tamilnadu of that period.			
Best Costume Design	Bharathi	Tamil	P. Krishnamoorthy	₹ 10,000/-
Best Costume Design	Citation: For recreating a whole range of period costume to depict the early twentieth century of Tamil/Banaras. The aesthetic selection of colours go well with the décor of the structure/sets and the costumes give the film and authentic look.			
Best Music Direction	Refugee	Hindi	Songs and Background Score: Anu Malik	₹ 10,000/-
Best Music Direction	Citation: For a score that blends with the story and heightens its narrative. A great effort has been made to ensure that the compositions have all the ingredients of the music of the soul.			
Best Lyrics	Mazha ("Gayam Hari Nama Dhayam")	Malayalam	Yusufali Kechery	₹ 10,000/- Each
Best Lyrics	Citation: For depicting the right mix of the ethos of our land in an invocation to lord Krishna.			₹ 10,000/- Each
Best Lyrics	Refugee ("Panchhi Nadiyaan")	Hindi	Javed Akhtar	₹ 10,000/- Each
Best Lyrics	Citation: For his inimitable style, speaks of transcending borders and countries, with beautifully written words for love and compassion.			₹ 10,000/- Each
Best Choreography	Kochu Kochu Santhoshangal	Malayalam	G. Kala	₹ 10,000/-
Best Choreography	Citation: For the classical dance number skilfully composed, creating the symbiotic dance in keeping with our rich traditions and heritage.			
Special Jury Award	Dekha	Bengali	Soumitra Chatterjee (Actor)	₹ 25,000/-
Special Jury Award	Citation: For his realistic portrayal of the scion of a fading aristocracy who has lost his eyesight. Soumitra with great subtlety takes us through myriad evoking situations of his life, past and present with great sensitivity.			

==== Regional Awards ====
The award is given to best film in the regional languages in India.

Name of Award	Name of Film	Awardee(s)	Cash prize
Best Feature Film in Bengali	Dekha	Producer: Ramesh Gandhi; Director: Gautam Ghose	₹ 20,000/- Each
Best Feature Film in Bengali	Citation: The film through the seen and unseen world of the protagonist tries to explore the existential dilemma of modern times which is reflected in the inexorable flow of time and intertwined into a mixed metaphor of modern allegories.		
Best Feature Film in Hindi	Zubeidaa	Producer: Farouq Rattonsey; Director: Shyam Benegal	₹ 20,000/- Each
Best Feature Film in Hindi	Citation: For the political turmoil has been juxtaposed with the upheavals of the life of a tempestuous Muslim girl who defies all norms to marry a much married maharaja. It is a story of obsessive love in the times of political priorities in post independent India.		
Best Feature Film in Kannada	Mathadana	Producer: H. G. Narayan and I. P. Malligowda; Director: T. N. Seetharam	₹ 20,000/- Each
Best Feature Film in Kannada	Citation: For delineating the way in which the larger political system influences and manipulates the lives of ordinary people at various levels, a commendable critique of the corroding corruption and power managing forces.		
Best Feature Film in Malayalam	Shayanam	Producer: M. P. Sukumaran Nair; Director: M. P. Sukumaran Nair	₹ 20,000/- Each
Best Feature Film in Malayalam	Citation: For the film with a wonderful structure and well worked out mise-en-scenes tries to depict a complex story of the Christian community in a simple manner.		₹ 20,000/- Each
Best Feature Film in Malayalam	Kochu Kochu Santhoshangal	Producer: Grihalakshmi Films; Director: Sathyan Anthikad	₹ 20,000/- Each
Best Feature Film in Malayalam	Citation: For a brilliant narrative depicting the complex relationship between a dancer wife and a loving husband. It highlights the values of life, art and the co-existence of the two.		₹ 20,000/- Each
Best Feature Film in Manipuri	Chatledo Eidee	Producer: Makhonmani Mongsaba; Director: Makhonmani Mongsaba	₹ 20,000/- Each
Best Feature Film in Manipuri	Citation: For narrating a complex love story in a simple manner and reflects the flavour of the land beautifully.		
Best Feature Film in Marathi	Astitva	Producer: Jhamu Sughand; Director: Mahesh Manjrekar	₹ 20,000/- Each
Best Feature Film in Marathi	Citation: For dealing with the social issues, adultery and the subjugation of women. The film ends on a positive note of a woman's empowerment when the protagonist extends her horizon beyond home and hearth.		
Best Feature Film in Tamil	Bharathi	Producer: Media Dreams Pvt. Ltd; Director: Gnana Rajasekaran	₹ 20,000/- Each
Best Feature Film in Tamil	Citation: For depicting the life and times of Subramaniya Bharati in a very authentic manner, unfolding the history of our freedom struggle. The compositions of this great visionary poet stand out with great relevance today.		
Best Feature Film in Telugu	Nuvve Kavali	Producer: Ramoji Rao; Director: K. Vijaya Bhaskar	₹ 20,000/- Each
Best Feature Film in Telugu	Citation: For a refreshing film about a teenage friendship that blossoms into romance. The film stands out for its youthful treatment thus bringing out the exuberance of this film.		

Best Feature Film in Each of the Language Other Than Those Specified in the Schedule VIII of the Constitution

Name of Award	Name of Film	Awardee(s)	Cash prize
Best Feature Film in English	Pandavas	Producer: Pentamedia Graphics Ltd; Director: Pentamedia Graphics Ltd	₹ 20,000/- Each
Best Feature Film in English	Citation: For bringing the epic of Mahabharata to life on screen with realistic depth and detail.		

=== Non-Feature Films ===
Short Films made in any Indian language and certified by the Central Board of Film Certification as a documentary/newsreel/fiction are eligible for non-feature film section.

==== Juries ====
A committee headed by John Matthew Matthan was appointed to evaluate the non-feature films awards. Following were the jury members:

- Jury Members
  - John Matthew Matthan (Chairperson) • Deepa Kapur • Sudhir Nandgaonkar • Kona Venkat • Kiran Ghai

==== Golden Lotus Award ====
Official Name: Swarna Kamal

All the awardees are awarded with 'Golden Lotus Award (Swarna Kamal)', a certificate and cash prize.

Name of Award	Name of Film	Language	Awardee(s)	Cash prize
Best Non-Feature Film	Rasikpriya	Hindi and English	Producer: Ministry of External Affairs; Director: Arun Vasant Khopkar	₹ 20,000/- Each
Best Non-Feature Film	Citation: For its sensitive treatment of Hindustani art music, tracing its evolution and cultural confluence to the present times, rendered with an exceptional collage of visuals and sounds.			
Best Non-Feature Film Direction	Rasikpriya	Hindi and English	Arun Vasant Khopkar	₹ 20,000/-
Best Non-Feature Film Direction	Citation: For artistically weaving visual metaphors to the rhythms of Hindustani classical music in a stylised and poetic manner.			

==== Silver Lotus Award ====
Official Name: Rajat Kamal

All the awardees are awarded with 'Silver Lotus Award (Rajat Kamal)' and cash prize.

Name of Award	Name of Film	Language	Awardee(s)	Cash prize
Best First Non-Feature Film	Meena Jha	Hindi	Producer: Satyajit Ray Film and Television Institute; Director: Anjalika Sharma	₹ 10,000/- Each
Best First Non-Feature Film	Citation: For its innovative approach in narrating a story of adolescent human experiences, treated in a stylised manner.			
Best Anthropological / Ethnographic Film	Scribbles on Akka	Kannada	Producer: Flavia Agnes; Director: Madhusree Dutta	₹ 10,000/- Each
Best Anthropological / Ethnographic Film	Citation: For exploring the life of a 12th century Karnataka ascetic poet Mahadevi Akka, who was an exponent of individual independence. The relevance of this rebellious poet is treated dramatically, in the context of contemporary times.			
Best Biographical Film	Devanarthakan (The Divine Dancer)	Malayalam	Producer: A. V. Ali Koya for Kerala State Chalachitra Academy; Director: Sudish Gopalakrishnan	₹ 10,000/- Each
Best Biographical Film	Citation: For the effective portrayal of Kodakkat Kannan Peruvannan, the renowned Theyyam artist, popularly known as Devanarthakan.			
Best Arts / Cultural Film	Tribal Women Artists	Hindi	Producer: Kuldeep Sinha for Films Division; Director: Brij Bhushan for Films Division	₹ 10,000/- Each
Best Arts / Cultural Film	Citation: For highlighting the creative abilities of the tribal women of Hazaribagh (Jharkhand) in an effective manner.			
Best Scientific Film	Vedic Mathematics	English	Producer: Bhanumurthy Alur for Films Division; Director: K. Jagjivan Ram for Films Division	₹ 10,000/- Each
Best Scientific Film	Citation: For presenting a scientific method of Mathematical calculations, existing in the Vedas and relating the relevance of this knowledge to the present times.			
Best Environment / Conservation / Preservation Film	The Nest	Bengali	Producer: Sparsh Productions Pvt. Ltd; Director: Supriyo Sen	₹ 10,000/- Each
Best Environment / Conservation / Preservation Film	Citation: For painstaking effort on capturing the uncompromising dedication oh Jatin Mahato (Midnapore – West Bengal), a heroic conservator and protector of migratory and endangered birds.			
Best Promotional Film	Pashmina Royale	English	Producer: Bappa Ray; Director: Bappa Ray	₹ 10,000/- Each
Best Promotional Film	Citation: For creatively tracing the history of Pashmina shawl and aesthetically portraying the designs and styles of this ancient Kashmiri art, which has now been revived.			
Best Agricultural Film	News Magazine No:424-Vermi Culture	Hindi	Producer: Kuldip Sinha for Films Division; Director: A. R. Sharief for Films Division	₹ 10,000/- Each
Best Agricultural Film	Citation: For methodically unfolding new techniques of composting manure from natural organic wastes that are biodegradable and eco-friendly.			
Best Historical Reconstruction / Compilation Film	From the land of Buddhism to the Land of Buddha	English	Producer: Kuldip Sinha for Films Division; Director: Shalini Shah for Films Division	₹ 10,000/- Each
Best Historical Reconstruction / Compilation Film	Citation: For its realistic and pictorial depiction of the culture, traditions and socio-economic conditions of the Tibetans settled in India.			
Best Film on Social Issues	Infiltrators	English	Producer: Urmi Chakraborty for Films Division; Director: Urmi Chakraborty for Films Division	₹ 10,000/- Each
Best Film on Social Issues	Citation: For its in-depth probe that unveils the illegal migration of Bangladeshis into India and the urgent need to address this issue on humanitarian grounds.			
Best Educational / Motivational / Instructional Film	Tulasi	English	Producer: Bhanumurthy Alur for Films Division; Director: Rajgopal Rao for Films Division	₹ 10,000/- Each
Best Educational / Motivational / Instructional Film	Citation: For the powerful portrayal of an aged tribal woman Tulasi's single-handed crusade against de-forestation and the resultant participation of people in preserving forests.			
Best Investigative Film	Wearing the face	English	Producer: Bankim for Films Division; Director: Joshy Joseph for Films Division	₹ 10,000/- Each
Best Investigative Film	Citation: For insight-fully and sensitively probing the masked lives of college students of Manipur, who are compelled by socio-political circumstances to pull rickshaws for their livelihood.			
Best Animation Film	The Landscape	Only Music	Producer: Bankim for Films Division; Director: Ravi Jadhav for Films Division	₹ 10,000/- Each
Best Animation Film	Citation: For its artistic visual narration of nature's beautiful landscapes turning into modern urban horrors.			
Best Short Fiction Film	Bhor	Bengali	Producer: Satyajit Ray Film and Television Institute; Director: Ritubarna Chudgar	₹ 10,000/- Each
Best Short Fiction Film	Citation: For its multi-layered treatment of a story that sketches the lives of two young people (sibling) caught in the web of their past and yet coping for survival.			
Best Film on Family Welfare	Akkareninnu	Malayalam	Producer: T. Sunil Kumar, Susmitham and Pallimalkunnu; Director: T. Sunil Kumar, Susmitham and Pallimalkunnu	₹ 5,000/- Each
Best Film on Family Welfare	Citation: For focusing attention on the plight of a family with an AIDS patient and their struggle in overcoming the social stigma.			₹ 5,000/- Each
Best Film on Family Welfare	Mahananda	Bengali	Producer: Films Division; Director: Madhuchhanda Sengupta	₹ 5,000/- Each
Best Film on Family Welfare	Citation: For handling a sensitive theme on family welfare, which depicts the fight of a village woman from a minority community who succeeds in her pursuit of a planned family.			₹ 5,000/- Each
Best Cinematography	Rasikpriya	Hindi and English	Cameraman: Prasann Jain; Laboratory Processing: Adlabs	₹ 10,000/- Each
Best Cinematography	Citation: For capturing images that speak in tones of light and shade, thereby giving life to the lyrical form of the film.			
Best Audiography	A Memory of the Sea	English	Hari Kumar	₹ 10,000/-
Best Audiography	Citation: For designing sound that imaginatively and creatively enhances the mood and narration of the film.			
Best Editing	Lokpriya	Hindi	Sankalp Meshram	₹ 10,000/-
Best Editing	Citation: For skilfully juxtaposing three streams of visuals into one rhythmic meaningful narrative.			
Best Music Direction	Ajeeb Ghar	Hindi	Usha Khanna	₹ 10,000/-
Best Music Direction	Citation: For rendering a melodious and vibrant tune, that keeps the story moving and engrossing.			
Special Jury Award	A Memory of the Sea	English	Roabin Mazumdar(Producer); Lygia Mathews(Director)	₹ 10,000/-
Special Jury Award	Citation: For her skilful narration of the various cultures and religions from across the sea, that have historically influenced the coastal life of Malabar.			
Special Mention	Meena Jha	Hindi	Amal Neerod C. R. (Cameraman)	Certificate Only
Special Mention	Citation: For his pictorial vision and capturing of images imaginatively showing great promise.			Certificate Only
Special Mention	Balgandharv	Marathi	Haimanti Banerjee (Director)	Certificate Only
Special Mention	Citation: For effectively capturing the spirit of the legendary Marathi theatre personality Balgandharv, the singer, well known for his portrayal of women characters.			Certificate Only

=== Best Writing on Cinema ===
The stated mission of awards is to encourage the study and appreciation of cinema as an art form and dissemination of information and critical appreciation of this art-form through publication of books, articles, reviews etc.

==== Juries ====
A committee headed by Bharathi Pradhan was appointed to evaluate the writing on Indian cinema. Following were the jury members:

- Jury Members
  - Bharathi Pradhan (Chairperson) • Prakash Dubey • Jayant Ghosal

==== Golden Lotus Award ====
Official Name: Swarna Kamal

All the awardees are awarded with 'Golden Lotus Award (Swarna Kamal)' and cash prize.

Name of Award	Name of Book	Language	Awardee(s)	Cash prize
Best Book on Cinema	Sholay: The Making of a Classic	English	Author: Anupama Chopra; Publisher: Penguin Books	₹ 15,000/- Each
Best Book on Cinema	Citation: For its lucid story-telling. A fast-paced, informative book, a fitting tribute to a box-office phenomenon. Even after 25 years, the making of Sholay, reported crisply and researched thoroughly, makes absorbing reading.			
Best Film Critic		Telugu	Vasiraju Prakasham	₹ 7,500/- Each
Best Film Critic	Citation: For deep knowledge of cinema which is reflected in his prolific writing.			₹ 7,500/- Each
Best Film Critic		Hindi	Suresh Sharma	₹ 7,500/- Each
Best Film Critic	Citation: For his interesting and analytical writing on cinema, constantly keeping in mind the Indian viewer.			₹ 7,500/- Each

==== Special Mention ====
All the award winners are awarded with Certificate of Merit.

Name of Award	Name of Book	Language	Awardee(s)	Cash prize
Special Mention (Book on Cinema)	Such Is Life	English	Author: Niranjan Pal	Certificate Only
Special Mention (Book on Cinema)	Citation: For its straightforward narration and personalised nostalgia, taking the reader right into the beginnings of Indian cinema.			Certificate Only
Special Mention (Book on Cinema)	Sangeet Ka Soundarya Bodh	Hindi	Author: Uma Garg	Certificate Only
Special Mention (Book on Cinema)	Citation: For going into and exploring a territory which authors rarely venture into – Indian film music.			Certificate Only
Special Mention (Film Critic)		English	Ratnottama Sengupta	Certificate Only
Special Mention (Film Critic)	Citation: For consistency and variety in her knowledgeable reporting on cinema.			Certificate Only

=== Awards not given ===
Following were the awards not given as no film was found to be suitable for the award:

- Best Special Effects
- Best Feature Film in Assamese
- Best Feature Film in Oriya
- Best Feature Film in Punjabi
- Best Exploration / Adventure Film
