= M. K. Binodini Devi =

Indian writer, poet, and princess (1922 – 2011)

Maharaj Kumari Binodini Devi
- Born: Sana Wangol; 6 February 1922; Royal Palace, Imphal, Manipur Kingdom
- Died: 17 January 2011 (aged 88); Yaiskul, Imphal, Manipur, India
- Occupations: Writer, poet, playwright
- Spouse: Dr L. Nanda Babu Roy (m. 1950, sep. 1967)
- Children: L. Debabrata Roy; L. Somi Roy
- Writing career
- Pen name: Binodini
- Language: Manipuri (Meiteilon)
- Notable awards: Jamini Sundar Guha Gold Medal (1966); Padma Shri (1976); Sahitya Akademi Award (1979)

Signature
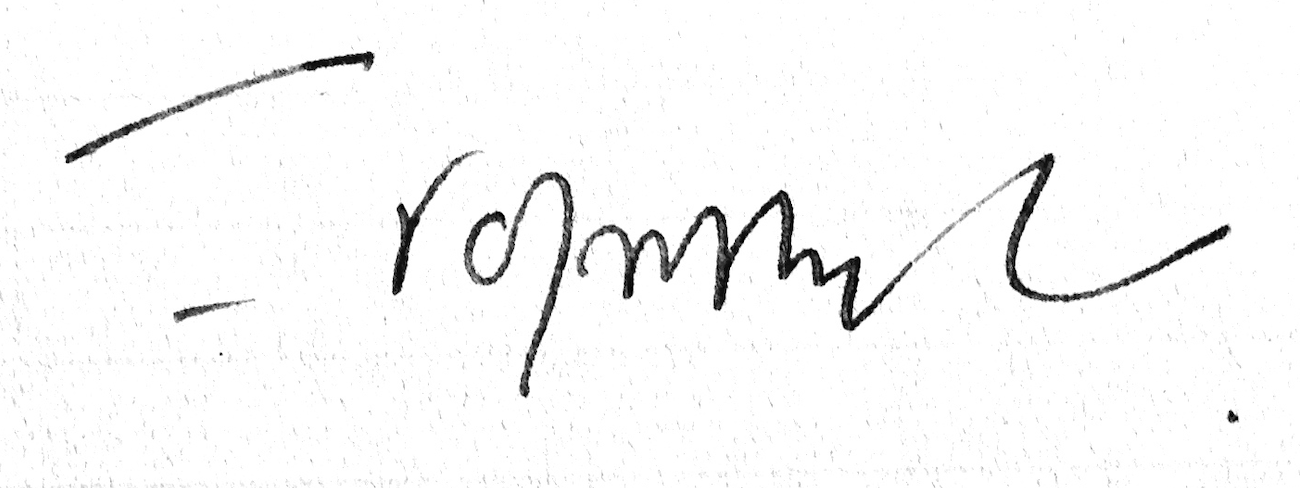

Maharaj Kumari Binodini Devi (born Sana Wangol; 6 February 1922 – 17 January 2011), known as M.K. Binodini Devi and henceforth referred to as MK Binodini or Binodini, the mononym that she wrote under, was a writer, social activist and princess of Manipur. She worked in multiple genres, including fiction, essays, drama, screenplays, lyrics, and ballet scripts often addressing themes such as patriarchy and colonialism in Manipuri society. She received the Padma Shri in 1976 (returned 2001), and her historical novel Boro Saheb Ongbi Sanatombi (1976) won the Sahitya Akademi Award in 1979. The novel was subsequently translated into English as The Princess and the Political Agent and published as a Penguin Modern Classic in 2020.

== Life ==
Sana Wangol or Wangolsana was born 6 February 1922 to Sir Maharaja Churachand Singh of the Manipur Kingdom and Maharani Dhanamanjuri Devi. M.K. Binodini Devi was the first woman to graduate in Manipur and its first woman writer.

She married Dr. Laifungbam Nanda Babu Roy, on 26 January 1950; they had two sons, L. Debabrata Roy and L. Somi Roy.

Binodini was also a sculptor and studied art in Santiniketan with Ramkinkar Baij (also Vaij) and other artists. Many of the portraits painted by Baij of her are now held in the National Gallery of Modern Art in New Delhi.

Imasi: The Maharaj Kumari Binodini Devi Foundation was established in Imphal, Manipur, by her son, L. Somi Roy, and the writer's friends and associates. Its stated goal is to preserve, protect and promote the legacy of M.K. Binodini Devi.

== Career ==
=== Literature ===
M.K. Binodini Devi wrote her first short story, Imaton (Stepmother), while she was still a student at Tamphasana Girls High School.

"My first short story was called Imaton. It is about a relationship between a young man and his young stepmother. I liked it immensely as a good story. So, I showed it to my teacher, Oja Salam Tombi, who also happened to be my tutor. Contrary to my expectations, he gave me a sound scolding for writing it. He said it was unbecoming of me to write such an immoral adult story."

Her first book was Nunggairakta Chandramukhi (ꯅꯨꯡꯒꯥꯏꯔꯛꯇ ꯆꯟꯗꯔꯥꯃꯨꯈꯤ; A Chrysanthemum in Gravel), a collection of 19 short stories published in 1965, for which she was awarded the Jamini Sundar Guha Gold Medal. Her collected short stories were published by Imasi Foundation as Wari Macha Binodinigi (Short Story Collection of Binodini) which included seven of her previously unpublished short stories. These 26 short stories are turned into audio recordings as an initiative of Imasi Foundation's Imasi Podcast project available on the Imasi Foundation YouTube channel. She received a Sahitya Akademi Award in 1979 for her historical novel Boro Saheb Ongbi Sanatombi (The Princess and the Political Agent). The historical novel is about Princess Sanatombi, her aunt, and Colonel Henry St. P. Maxwell, the political agent of Manipur, and is set in the years leading up and following the Anglo-Manipuri War of 1891. It was recorded as an audiobook by Penguin Random House, India and Audible in 2023.

Binodini wrote her play Asangba Nongjabi (Crimson Rainclouds, Thema Books, 2012) (ꯑꯁꯪꯕ ꯅꯣꯡꯖꯥꯕꯤ), adapting it for the stage from her radio play called Shilpi. She wrote 15 radio plays, 12 of which are published in the collection, Khonjel Lila Binodinigi (The Collected Radio Plays of Binodini; ꯈꯣꯟꯖꯦꯜ ꯂꯤꯂꯥ ꯕꯤꯅꯣꯗꯤꯅꯤꯒꯤ; Imasi Publications, 2016). She translated Ebong Indrajit, a notable Bangla-language play by Badal Sircar, as well as works by Rabindranath Tagore and Sankar.

Her last book was a volume of memoir essays about life in the royal palace, titled Churachand Maharajgi Imung (ꯆꯨꯔꯥꯆꯥꯟꯗ ꯃꯥꯍꯥꯔꯥꯖꯒꯤ ꯏꯃꯨꯡ) (The Maharaja's Household: A Daughter's Memories of Her Father, Zubaan 2015). It covers the reign of Maharaja Churachand from 1891-1941. These essays appeared first in the Manipuri daily, Poknapham. The volume of essays was published in 2008.

=== Film ===
Binodini wrote screenplays for Manipuri feature films like Olangthagee Wangmadasu (ꯑꯣꯂꯥꯡꯊꯥꯒꯤ ꯋꯥꯡꯃꯗꯁꯨ;1980), Imagi Ningthem (ꯏꯃꯥꯒꯤ ꯅꯤꯡꯊꯦꯝ;1981), Paokhum Ama (ꯄꯥꯎꯈꯨꯝ ꯑꯃꯥ;1983), Thengmallabara Radhamanbi (ꯊꯦꯡꯃꯜꯂꯕꯔꯥ ꯔꯥꯘꯥ ꯃꯥꯟꯕꯤ;1985), Ishanou (ꯏꯁꯥꯅꯧ;1990), Mayophygee Macha (ꯃꯥꯌꯣꯐꯤꯒꯤ ꯃꯆꯥ;1994), Asangba Nongjabi, 2003 and Nangna Kappa Pakchade (ꯅꯪꯅ ꯀꯞꯄ ꯄꯛꯆꯗꯦ; 2013). Her story Ngaihak Lambida (ꯉꯥꯏꯍꯥꯛ ꯂꯝꯕꯤꯗꯥ) was made into a short film by Haobam Paban Kumar. She also wrote the scripts for non-fiction films such as Orchids of Manipur (1993), Sangai: The Dancing Deer of Manipur (1991), and Laa (ꯂꯥ).

In 1981, Aribam Syam Sharma's film Imagi Ningthem (My Son, My Precious, screenplay published by Cinewave, 1981) based on her screenplay adapted from her radioplay of the same name, won the Montgolfiere Grand Prix at Nantes in France. She wrote the original screenplay of Ishanou (Aribam Syam Sharma, 1990), whch was selected for Un Certain Regard at the 1991 Cannes Film Festival. It was later recognised as a Cannes Classic in May 2023. She scripted the film version of the Manipuri ballet called Sangai: The Dancing Deer of Manipur by Aribam Syam Sharma which was selected as the Outstanding Film of the Year Award for 1991 by the British Film Institute (BFI).

Many of her screenplays won national and state film awards in India, including multiple awards for Olangthagee Wangmadasu and the Best Story Award at the 9th Manipur State Film Awards for the movie, Nangna Kappa Pakchade in 2014, awarded posthumously.

=== Songs ===
Binodini wrote 58 songs and translated 29 Rabindra Sangeet into Manipuri. These were published in Isei Binodinigi (ꯏꯁꯩ ꯕꯤꯅꯣꯗꯤꯅꯤꯒꯤ) by Imasi Publications in 2014. The second edition of this collection of songs by Binodini was published as Khongjom Parba Amadi Isei Binodinigi as a dual Meitei Mayek and Bangla script edition in 2026 by Imasi Foundation, with the addition of her epic ballad, Khongjom Parba, about the Anglo-Manipuri War of 1891 and its aftermath. She wrote lyrics for a song titled Lapna Lotna Leiyu (ꯂꯥꯞꯅ ꯂꯣꯠꯅ ꯂꯩꯌꯨ) for the first Manipuri feature film Matamgi Manipur (ꯃꯇꯝꯒꯤ ꯃꯅꯤꯄꯨꯔ) (1973). Many of her songs are still sung today and are classics of contemporary Manipuri songs. They were all performed by artists of Roop Raag (ꯔꯨꯞ ꯔꯥꯒ) and were broadcast over All India Radio, Imphal.

Patriotic songs written by her such as Kannada Sinnani Phiral Ase (ꯀꯟꯅꯥꯗ ꯁꯤꯟꯅꯅꯤ ꯐꯤꯔꯥꯜ ꯑꯁꯦ), Sukna Mamla Guha Nungda (ꯁꯨꯛꯅ ꯃꯝꯂ ꯒꯨꯍꯥ ꯅꯨꯡꯗ) and Lairabini Hainei Ima Nangbu Mina (ꯂꯥꯏꯔꯕꯤꯅꯤ ꯍꯥꯏꯅꯩ ꯏꯃꯥ ꯅꯪꯕꯨ ꯃꯤꯅ) were associated with the Great June Uprising on 18 June 2001. It was the occasion when she returned her Padma Shri awarded to her by the Government of India in 1976.

=== Dance ===
Binodini wrote the scripts for six modern Manipuri ballets. They were produced by the Jawaharlal Nehru Manipur Dance Academy (JNMDA) where she served as Secretary for 11 years. They include Keibmuchamjao (ꯀꯩꯕꯨꯜ ꯂꯝꯖꯥꯎ; 1985) and Loktak Isei (ꯂꯣꯛꯇꯥꯛ ꯏꯁꯩ, 1991; The Ballad of Loktak).

"The Loktak lake is a rich depository of several legendary tales. There is a big tradition, a huge cultural tradition associated with the lake. There has been so much literature on the Loktak, inspired by its beauty and charm, of its legends and folktales. That is why I have tried to write the ballet Loktak Eshei [sic] for the Jawaharlal Nehru Manipur Dance Academy."

They use both classical Manipuri Dance and folk styles to tell stories based on Manipuri folklore. These ecological ballets contributed to environmental awareness and wildlife preservation in Manipur. The film version of her ballet Keibul Lamjao's, titled Sangai: The Dancing Deer of Manipur, was produced by Sangeet Natak Akademi.

In 1976, M.K. Binodini Devi led a Manipuri dance troupe to perform at the Smithsonian Institution in Washington DC for the celebration of the US Bicentennial. The troupe also toured Mexico, Canada and Europe. In 2003, she wrote Ho Mexico! Lamkoi Wari (ꯍꯣ ꯃꯦꯛꯁꯤꯀꯣ! ꯂꯝꯀꯣꯏ ꯋꯥꯔꯤ; O Mexico! Travel Tales), a series of travel essays about the dance tour.

=== Essays and social activism ===
M.K. Binodini Devi used her literature to advocate for wildlife and environmental causes. Her essay Thoibido Warouhou'i (ꯊꯣꯏꯕꯤꯗꯣ ꯋꯥꯔꯧꯍꯧꯏ) (The Pique of the Doe, 1973) was her basis for her ballet Keibul Lamjao. These works ignited themes of wildlife appreciation and environmental awareness.

"I felt ashamed to ride in the presence of the animals. I got off and walked down the hill. The car followed me, stupidly."

The essay along with others Ahong Yumna Haihou'i (ꯑꯍꯣꯡ ꯌꯨꯝꯅ ꯍꯥꯏꯍꯧꯢ;The Ancestral Home) and Darjeeling Chat'ngeida (ꯗꯥꯔꯖꯤꯂꯤꯡ ꯆꯠꯉꯩꯗ; Upon a Visit to Darjeeling). Most of them were published in Manipuri newspapers like Poknapham (ꯄꯣꯛꯅꯐꯝ) and Naharolgi Thoudang (ꯅꯥꯍꯥꯔꯣꯜꯒꯤ ꯊꯧꯗꯥꯡ).

"A woman of letters, she contributes regularly to the local dailies such as Poknapham, Naharolgi Thoudang and the Imphal Free Press with letters, stories, articles and commentaries of current social and political issues in Manipur."

M.K. Binodini Devi took part in the Quit India Movement in 1942, and was a lifetime president of the Manipur chapter of the Indian People's Theatre Association (IPTA).

Her patriotic songs including Kannada Sinnani Phiral Ase and Lairabini Hainei Ima Nangbu Mina are popular in Manipur today. In October 2001, she founded LEIKOL (Leima Khorjei Kol) (ꯂꯩꯃ ꯈꯣꯔꯖꯩ ꯀꯣꯜ), a women's writers' circle. In 1975, she introduced microfinancing for market women and was the founding chairman of the Manipur Women's Cooperative Bank Ltd.

She was elected to the Manipur Assembly in 1952.

== Bibliography ==
=== Publications (in Manipuri) ===
- Nunggairakta Chandramukhi (A Chrysanthemum in Gravel, 1965), short stories
- Asangba Nongjabi (Crimson Rainclouds, 1966), plays
- Boro Saheb Ongbi Sanatombi (The Princess and the Political Agent, 1976), novel
- Amasung Indrajit (And Indrajit, 1990), translation of the Bengali play by Badal Sircar
- O Mexico! Lamkoi Wari (2004), travel writing about Mexico, the US and Europe
- Churachand Maharajgi Imung (The Maharaja's Household, memoir essays, 2008)
- Isei Binodinigi (Songs of Binodini, ed.: Aribam Syam Sharma, Chongtham Kamala; Imasi Publications, 2014)
- Khonjel Lila Binodinigi (Radio Plays of Binodini, ed.: Chongtham Kamala, Dr. Tarunkumari Bishnulatpam; Imasi Publications, 2016)
- Wari Macha Binodinigi (Collected Short Stories of Binodini) ed. L. Somi Roy; Imasi Publications, 2022)

=== Film scripts (in Manipuri) ===
- Olangthagee Wangmadasoo (feature film, original screenplay, 1980)
- Imagi Ningthem (feature film, 1981)
- Paokhum Ama (feature film, original screenplay, 1983)
- Sangai, the Dancing Deer of Manipur (documentary, 1988),
- Ishanou (feature film, original screenplay,1990)
- Mayophygee Macha (feature film, 1994)
- Orchids of Manipur (documentary, 1994)
- Sanabi (feature film, 1995)
- La (documentary, 1997),
- Thengmallabara Radhamanbi (feature film, 1999)
- Ashangba Nongjabi (television feature film, 2003)
- Ngaihak Lambida (short feature, story, 2006)
- Nangna Kappa Pakchade (feature, 2013)

=== Radio plays ===
- Basi Marol Chumdaba
- Charangnaraba Nung
- Cheisra
- Chithi
- Imagi Ningthem
- Imphal Kaba
- Jahanara or Ketabgi Segaikhraba Lamai
- Kanana Keithel Kabini?
- Kaorabara Ras Sannabagi Ahingdo
- Nandini
- Nangna Kappa Pakchade
- Ngaikho, Hingminakhisi
- Nongphadok Lakpada
- Shilpi, later Asangba Nongjabi
- Sribon Chinggi Tamnalai
- Thengmallabara Radhamanbi

=== Adaptations ===
- Ahing Amagi Wari (based on a story by Haobam Satyabati)
- Charangnaraba Nung (Rabindranath Tagore's Hungry Stones)
- Nongphadok Lakpada (based on Lamabam Biramani's Atithi)
- Sanabi (based on Binodini's Sanabi)

=== Ballet scripts (in Manipuri) ===
- Kong Hangoi (children's ballet, 1971)
- Thoibi (ballet, 1972)
- Keibul Lamjao (wildlife ballet, 1984)
- Loktak Isei (ecology ballet, 1991)
- Pebet (children's ballet, 1996)
- A Throw of Dice (based on the Mahabharata)

=== Translations ===
- Ima (Mother, Maxim Gorky)
- Amasung Indrajit (Evam Indrajit, Badal Sircar)
- Solution X (Badal Sircar)
- Sakhangdaba Kayani (Koto Ajanare, Shankar)
- Charangnaraba Nung (Khudito Pashan, Rabindranath Tagore)
- Karna Kunti Sangbad (Rabindranath Tagore)
- 28 Rabindra Sangeet (Rabindranath Tagore)

=== Selected translations ===
- My Son, My Precious (Imagi Ningthem). Translation by L. Somi Roy. Cinewave, Calcutta 1981
- One Answer (Paokhum Ama). Cinewave, Calcutta 1982
- My Little Friend (Imphal Turelgi Itamacha). Translation by L. Somi Roy. Sahitya Akademi anthology. New Delhi 2005
- A String of Beads (Charik Pareng, in The Grasshopper and Other Stories) Cambridge University Press, New Delhi 2011
- Crimson Rainclouds (Asangba Nongjabi). Translation by L. Somi Roy. Thema Books, Calcutta 2012
- Sanatombi (Boro Saheb Ongbi Sanatombi). Translated into Assamese by Indramani Rajkumar; Sahitya Akademi, 2012
- The Maharaja's Household: A Daughter's Memories of Her Father (Churachandgi Maharajgi Imung). Translation by L. Somi Roy. Zubaan Books, 2015
- Girls Hostel (Sri Bhavana). Translation by L. Somi Roy. Viswabharati Quarterly, 2018; Crafting the World, Zubaan Books, 2019
- The Princess and the Political Agent (Boro Saheb Ongbi Sanatombi). Translation by L. Somi Roy. Penguin Modern Classics, Penguin Random House India, 2020
- Nil Sandhyar Agun Megh (Asangba Nongjabi and Sri Bhavana). Translation into Bangla by Minati Ghosh and L. Somi Roy, Bhasha Samsad, 2022)

=== Biography ===
- Binodini: A Writer's Life, Film by Aribam Syam Sharma, Sahitya Akademi, 2003, 26 min.
- MK Binodini Devi, L. Somi Roy, Sahitya Akademi, Makers of Indian Literature series, 2022

== Awards ==
- Nunggairakta Chandramukhi, Jamini Sunder Guha Gold Medal, 1966
- Padma Shri, 1976, returned 2001
- Boro Saheb Ongbi Sanatombi, Sahitya Akademi Award, 1979
- Kamal Kumari National Award for Culture, 2002
- Eminent Senior Writer Award, Sahitya Akademi, 2007
- Lifetime Achievement Award, Manipur State Kala Akademi, 2011 (posthumous)
- Best Story award at the 9th Manipur State Film Awards for Nangna Kappa Pakchade.
