= Yengkhom Roma =

- Born: Yengkhom Romabai Devi; 23 September 1945 (age 80); Imphal, Manipur
- Occupations: Actress, director, writer
- Parent(s): Yengkhom Birendra; Yengkhom Ongbi Mani

Yengkhom Roma (born 23 September 1945) is an Indian actress who predominantly appeared in Manipuri films. She is a resident of Imphal, Manipur, where she was born in 1945 to Yengkhom Birendra and Yengkhom Ongbi Mani. Besides acting, she has also directed a documentary film titled Jagoida Katthoklabi Suryamukhi Devi. She also worked as an assistant director in the film Ashangba Nongjabi.

She was conferred with the Lifetime Achievement Award at the 12th Manipur State Film Awards 2019.

== Early life ==
She completed her matriculation from Tamphasana School in 1966 and graduation in 1970 from GP Women College. In IX standard, she joined Students Artist Association, took active part and won many awards.

== Career ==
She has acted in more than 100 radio plays. She started appearing in film with the release of the first Manipuri film Matamgi Manipur in 1972 and has since established a career in the Manipuri film industry. In the 1st Manipur State Film Awards 1984, she won the Best Actress Award for her role of Harmila in the film Paokhum Ama.

During today's era of digital films in Manipuri cinema, she also acted in some of them, namely Ningthem, Imphal Ningol, Khongthang-gi Makhol and Ayekpa Lai.

She was a jury member for the Indian Panorama section of the International Film Festival of India 2013.

== Accolades ==
She has won a number of awards, including the Best Actress Award in the first Manipur State Film Festival, 1984. She was also honoured with Neta Irawat Leelaroi Lifetime Achievement Award by Sahitya Seva Samiti, Kakching, in 2013.

- Best supporting actress in the All Manipur Drama Festival 1966-67
- Best actress in the All Manipur Drama Festival 1967-68
- Best director in the All Manipur Drama Services Inter Competition 1984
- Best actress in the All Manipur Drama Services Inter Competition 1990
- Special Award in the Akashvani Annual Award 1980
- Best actress award in the First Manipur State Film Festival, 1984

== Filmography ==
| Year | Film | Role | Director |
|---|---|---|---|
| 1972 | Matamgi Manipur | Tampak | Debkumar Bose |
| 1974 | Lamja Parshuram | Parshuram's Mother | Aribam Syam Sharma |
| 1979 | Olangthagee Wangmadasoo | Thadoi | Aribam Syam Sharma |
| 1983 | Paokhum Ama | Harmila | Aribam Syam Sharma |
| 1994 | Mayophygee Macha | | Oken Amakcham |
| 1999 | Aroiba Bidai | | Oken Amakcham |
| 2008 | Crossroads | Jotin's mother | Aribam Syam Sharma |
| 2008 | Ningthem | | Khwairakpam Bishwamittra |
| 2009 | Khongthang-gi Makhol | | O. Gautam |
| 2010 | Imphal Ningol | Leibaklei's mother-in-law | Bijgupta Laishram |
| 2010 | Piranglakta Manglan Ama | Ibemhal | Khangembam Kuleswar |
| 2014 | Ayekpa Lai | Ngamba's mother | Oken Amakcham |
| 2019 | Nongphadok Lakpa Atithi | Angangjaobi | Aribam Syam Sharma |
