= Shougrakpam Hemanta =

Indian actor from Manipur

- Born: 1969 (age 56–57); Irom Meijrao Mamang Leikai, Thoubal District, Manipur
- Occupations: Actor, Comedian, Writer, Director
- Awards: Manipur State Kala Akademi Award (2013); Sangeet Natak Akademi Award (2017)

Shougrakpam Hemanta (born 1969) is an Indian comedian, actor, writer and director, who has worked in various Shumang Kumhei plays and Manipuri films. He is well known for his role of Oja Tolhan in Eegi Mahao and his portrayal of the title role in the movie Mantri Dolansana. In 2017, he was conferred with the prestigious Sangeet Natak Akademi Award in recognition of his contribution in the traditional Meitei theatre of the Shumang Kumhei. With this, he became the first person to receive the award for this art form.

Shougrakpam Hemanta also served as the secretary of Manipur State Shumang Leela Council.

== Career ==
Hemanta joined Shumang Kumhei on 20 December 1982. In the beginning of his career in the field of performing arts, he did not receive patronage from his parents. With his strong courage and determination, he continued to learn the basics of the traditional theatre form. He had received guidance from renowned theatre personalities like L. Ibotombi Sharma, N. Angouton Meetei and T. Nabakumar Singh. He received the first Best Comedian award for his role in the Shumang Leela Sharat Ritugi Purnima. He has acted in more than 70 plays. Some of his well known plays include Lidicegee Gulap, Memsahebki Saree, Kanchi Ashram and Ningol Chakkouba. He has also directed more than 20 Shumang Leelas and wrote around eight plays. He bagged the Best Director Award and won Best Comedian Award 25 times.

His is popularly known as Oja Tolhan for his comic role of a teacher in the movie Eegi Mahao. His titular role in the comedy-genre film Mantri Dolansana is also vividly remembered until today by the cinema lovers of Manipur. He has directed a movie named Shakhangdaba.

== Selected Shumang Kumheis ==
- Sharat Ritugi Purnima
- Kanchi Ashram
- Lidicegee Gulap
- Devadas
- Memsahebki Saree
- Ningol Chakkouba
- Ugandagee Maraibak
- Nangna Luhongdringei
- Ingagee Purnima
- Urirei Madhabee
- Samballeina Kundo
- Mangluraba Lann
- Sanagee Ching
- Sagol Kangjei
- Mera Thaomei (2016)
- Khoi Mahum
- Ee Maree
- Luchingba
- Mellei Laishna
- Ahinggi Likla
- Kolom Semkhraba Leihao
- Pameldugee Ukhada
- Leikanglada Thambal
- Ahingda Numit (2019)
- Kak E Dagi Ee
- Leikrakta Lou Uba (2020)
- Keidoubagi Kidoino (2021)
- Wakhal Eronba (2022)
- Ireibakkidamak (2022)
- Khunai Mai Taaba (2022)
- Pathou Mangol Khenjonglang (2023)
- 3rd May (2025)
- Punshi Mathel (2025)

== Selected filmography ==
Year	Film	Director
1992	Eegi Mahao	Dinesh Tongbram
1993	Mantri Dolansana	Dinesh Tongbram
2004	Asira Punshi?	Kh. Ranjit
2007	Yenning Amadi Likla	Makhonmani Mongsaba
2007	Meitei Chanu	Amar Raj
2009	Thokkidagi Kishi	Diya Khwairakpam
2009	Tayai	K. Bimol Sharma
2009	Nongoubee	K. Bimol Sharma & Oja Tomba
2010	Heeyang Athouba	Santa Potsangbam
2010	Echasha Epa Lamboirage	Diya Khwairakpam
2011	Shakhangdaba	Shougrakpam Hemanta
2012	Japan Laanda Imphal	Chandam Shyamacharan & Manorama Devi
2013	Chahi Taramari	G. Amir
2013	Tokpa Landagee	Krishnand (Boji) Ningombam
2016	Thaba	Devbrata Samurai & Dpak Manohar
2018	Maram Chanu	Bijgupta Laishram
