= Mayophygee Macha =

1994 Manipuri film

- Movie Poster
- Directed by: Oken Amakcham
- Screenplay by: M. K. Binodini Devi
- Story by: M. K. Binodini Devi
- Produced by: Thoungamba; Thouyangba
- Starring: R.S. Joycee; Makhonmani Mongsaba
- Cinematography: Ph. Saratchandra
- Edited by: Ujjal Nandi
- Music by: Nameirakpam Tiken
- Production company: P.K. Films
- Distributed by: P.K. Films
- Release date: 1994
- Running time: 92 minutes
- Country: India
- Language: Meiteilon (Manipuri)

Mayophygee Macha (English: Mayophy's Son; also written as Mayophy Gee Macha) is a 1994 Manipuri film written by M. K. Binodini Devi and directed by Oken Amakcham. R.S. Joycee and Makhonmani Mongsaba were cast in the lead roles. It was produced by Thoungamba and Thouyangba of P.K. Films. The movie won the National Film Award for Best Feature Film in Manipuri at the 42nd National Film Awards. It is a celluloid movie.

The movie was mainly shot in Ukhrul.

== Plot ==
Mayophy, a lady from a hill district of Manipur, falls in love with Basanta, a guy from Imphal. When she becomes pregnant, Basanta abandons her. She tries to contact him, but to no avail. Kunjo (Mayophy's teacher and Basanta's friend) leaves no stone unturned to help Mayophy but denial becomes the only routine answer for Basanta. She never steps back but raises her son as a lone single mother with all courage and determination. Mayophy's son grows to become a successful sportsperson.

== Cast ==
- R.S. Joycee as Mayophy, Angamla's daughter
- Makhonmani Mongsaba as Kunjo
- Narendra Ningomba as Basanta
- Lourembam Pishak as Sanola, Mayophy's grandmother
- Chan Heisnam as Samfang, Chowkidar
- Wangkhem Lalitkumar as District Collector
- Bimola as Angamla
- Nongyai as Mayophy's son
- Laimayum Gunabati as Basanta's mother
- Yengkhom Roma
- Neena
- Kalpana
- Tiken

== Accolades ==
Mayophygee Macha won the National Film Award for Best Feature Film in Manipuri at the 42nd National Film Awards 1995. The citation for the National Award reads, "For a simple story of a rural life in Manipuri handled with a deft mastery over the medium".
