= Chatledo Eidi =

- Poster
- Directed by: Makhonmani Mongsaba
- Screenplay by: Moirangthem Inao
- Story by: Moirangthem Inao
- Produced by: Makhonmani Mongsaba
- Starring: Nityaibi; G. Kavita
- Cinematography: Chandra
- Music by: Sagolsem Tijendra
- Production company: Sangai Films
- Distributed by: Sangai Films
- Release date: 20 February 2000
- Running time: 121 minutes
- Country: India
- Language: Meiteilon (Manipuri)

Chatledo Eidi (English: Gone With A Heavy Heart) is a 2000 Indian Manipuri film directed and produced by Makhonmani Mongsaba under the banner of Sangai Films. It is based on the famous radio play Chatledo Eidi Meigee Ching Puduna by Moirangthem Inao. The film was selected for Indian Panorama of the 32nd International Film Festival of India (IFFI) 2001. The movie won the National Film Award for Best Feature Film in Manipuri at the 48th National Film Awards.

== Plot ==
Sheilesh and Sandhyarani's love affair begins on a rainy day through a mutual friend Radharani. Both the lovebirds face harsh realities of life in differing ways. Sheilesh looks for new jobs and opportunities but the prevailing system of corruption never stands in favour of a simpleton like him. Sandhyarani lives under a roof where her sister-in-law becomes the main reason for their family's harmony to be constantly disturbed. Despite all the obstacles their lives have to offer, Sheilesh and Sandhyarani strive hard for a shared future. Unfortunately, they part ways and Sandhyarani leaves her paternal home with a heavy heart.

== Cast ==
- Nityaibi as Sheilesh
- G. Kavita as Sandhyarani
- Rajkumar Jnaranjan as Rajen, Sandhyarani's brother
- Jugeshwari as Bimola, Rajen's wife
- Randhoni as Sandhyarani's and Rajen's mother
- Romesh
- Shumila as Radharani, Sandhyarani's friend
- Mangsidam Binod
- Birjit Ngangomba
- Ibochouba Meetei
- Tamphamani
- Muhini
- Baby Dipa
- Ojit

== Accolades ==
The movie won the National Film Award for Best Feature Film in Manipuri at the 48th National Film Awards. The citation for the National Award reads, "For narrating a complex love story in a simple manner and reflects the flavour of the land beautifully".

The film won the Best Feature Film and Best Director Awards at the 5th Manipur State Film Festival.

Award	Category	Winner's name	Result
48th National Film Awards	Best Feature Film in Manipuri	Makhonmani Mongsaba	Won
5th Manipur State Film Awards	Best Feature Film	Makhonmani Mongsaba	Won
5th Manipur State Film Awards	Best Director	Makhonmani Mongsaba	Won
5th Manipur State Film Awards	Best Actress	G. Kavita	Won

== Soundtrack ==
Sagolsem Tijendra composed the soundtrack for the film.

Chatledo Eidi

Soundtrack album by Sunita Nepram, Udit Narayan, Poornima, Alka Yagnik, Sagolsem Tijendra
- Released: 2000
- Genre: Feature film soundtrack
- Length: 23:21
- Label: Sangai Films

No.	Title	Music	Singer(s)	Length
1.	"Chatledo Eidi"	Sagolsem Tijendra	Sunita Nepram	05:06
2.	"Chiklaba Thamoigi Leikolsida"	Sagolsem Tijendra	Udit Narayan, Poornima	05:40
3.	"Eigi Nungshibana"	Sagolsem Tijendra	Sagolsem Tijendra	04:30
4.	"Malangba Nangse Ngaowida"	Sagolsem Tijendra	Alka Yagnik	03:55
5.	"Tahourehe Kanagino"	Sagolsem Tijendra	Udit Narayan	04:20
Total length:				23:21
