= Boro Saheb Ongbi Sanatombi =

1976 novel by M. K. Binodini Devi

- Author: M. K. Binodini Devi
- Language: Meiteilon
- Genre: Historical fiction
- Published: 1976
- Publisher: Wangolsana Endowment For Arts And Culture In Manipur
- Publication place: India
- Media type: Paperback
- Pages: 251
- Awards: Sahitya Akademi Award (1979)
- ISBN: 978-81-920694-0-1

Boro Saheb Ongbi Sanatombi is the first novel written by M. K. Binodini Devi. The book was published in 1976 and printed by Lamyanba Printers. The novel follows the romance between the writer's rebellious aunt Sanatombi, a Meitei princess and the first political agent of Manipur after the British colonization of Manipur, Lt. Col. Henry P. Maxwell. The book won the prestigious Sahitya Akademi Award in the year 1979.

The sixth edition of the novel was published in March 2019. This book is a part of the syllabus of the M.A. (Meitei Mayek) course prescribed by the Manipur University.

== Translation ==
This novel has been translated into English language by the writer's son, L. Somi Roy under the title The Princess And The Political Agent. The translated ebook was published by Penguin Modern Classics and released on 11 May 2020 in Amazon.
