= Nangna Kappa Pakchade =

- Movie Poster
- Directed by: Makhonmani Mongsaba
- Written by: M. K. Binodini Devi
- Produced by: Thoungamba; Thouyangba
- Starring: Leishangthem Tonthoi; Denny Likmabam
- Cinematography: N. Dilip
- Edited by: Yoimayai Mongsaba
- Music by: Nameirakpam Tiken; Sound Design & Background Score: Jeetenkumar Naorem
- Production company: P.K. Films
- Distributed by: P.K. Films
- Release date: 14 December 2013
- Running time: 74 minutes
- Country: India
- Language: Meiteilon (Manipuri)

Nangna Kappa Pakchade (English: Tears of a Woman) is a 2013 Manipuri film directed by Makhonmani Mongsaba and produced by Thoungamba Thouyangba, under the banner of P.K. Films. The film features Leishangthem Tonthoi and Denny Likmabam in the lead roles. The story of the film was written by Maharaj Kumari Binodini Devi. The film got selection at the 3rd Delhi International Film Festival 2014. The film was screened at Gorky Sadan Hall, Kolkata on 8 March 2014 on the occasion of International Women's Day. It also got selection at Ladakh International Film Festival 2014 in the Indian Feature section. The movie was screened in the competition section of the Kinshasa International Film Festival (KIFF) 2017, Democratic Republic of Congo.

Nangna Kappa Pakchade is based on the radio play by M. K. Binodini Devi of the same title. This film is the fifth production of P.K. Films. It is a 35 mm celluloid movie.

== Synopsis ==
It narrates the story of a woman Nungshitombi, who fought against her husband with courage by filing a case in the court, where her husband denies Nungshitombi and her child as his own wife and his child.

== Cast ==
- Leishangthem Tonthoi as Nungshitombi
- Denny Likmabam as Lawyer
- Leibakshemba as Ibomcha, Nungshitombi's husband
- R.K. Sorojini Devi as Nungshitombi's aunty
- Lourembam Pishak as Nungshitombi's grandmother
- Baby Aribam Ashmita as Nungshitombi's daughter
- L. Imo
- Bimola as Shopkeeper

== Accolades ==
The film bagged 7 awards at the 9th Manipur State Film Awards 2014. The Best Story award was given to M. K. Binodini Devi posthumously. The movie also received the Special Jury Award with the title Epic Mirror of the Century in Kinshasa International Film Festival 2017.

Award	Category	Winner's name	Result
Kinshasa International Film Festival 2017	Special Jury Award (Epic Mirror of the Century)	Director: Makhonmani Mongsaba; Producers: Thoungamba Thouyangba	Won
9th Manipur State Film Awards 2014	Best Feature Film	Director: Makhonmani Mongsaba; Producers: Thoungamba Thouyangba	Won
9th Manipur State Film Awards 2014	Best Director	Makhonmani Mongsaba	Won
9th Manipur State Film Awards 2014	Best Story	M. K. Binodini Devi	Won
9th Manipur State Film Awards 2014	Best Actor in a Leading Role - Female	Leishangthem Tonthoingambi Devi	Won
9th Manipur State Film Awards 2014	Best Actor in a Supporting Role - Female	R.K. Sorojini Devi	Won
9th Manipur State Film Awards 2014	Best Make-Up	Bhogen	Won
9th Manipur State Film Awards 2014	Best Music Director	Nameirakpam Tiken	Won
