= Sanabi =

- Official Poster
- Directed by: Aribam Syam Sharma
- Written by: M. K. Binodini Devi
- Produced by: Doordarshan; National Film Development Corporation (NFDC)
- Starring: Haorongbam Deben; R.K. Sushila
- Cinematography: Sunny Joseph
- Edited by: Ujjal Nandy
- Music by: Aribam Syam Sharma
- Production company: National Film Development Corporation (NFDC)
- Distributed by: Doordarshan
- Release date: 1995
- Running time: 88 minutes (Original); 67 minutes (Director's cut)
- Country: India
- Language: Meiteilon (Manipuri)

Sanabi (English: The Grey Mare) is a 1995 Manipuri film written by M. K. Binodini Devi and directed by Aribam Syam Sharma. The movie stars Haorongbam Deben and R.K. Sushila in the lead roles. It was jointly produced by Doordarshan and National Film Development Corporation (NFDC). The film won the National Film Award for Best Feature Film in Manipuri at the 43rd National Film Awards. Sanabi got selection at the International Film Festival of India, 1996 and Cairo International Film Festival, Egypt, 1996.

Sanabi in its original form was written as a short story by M. K. Binodini Devi under the title Sagol Sanabi. It was later made into a radio play named as Shriban Chinggi Tamnalai.

== Plot ==
Mangi, irritated by his childhood friend Sakhi’s refusal to marry him, steals her beloved grey mare in order to force her to agree.

== Cast ==
- Haorongbam Deben as Mangi
- R.K. Sushila as Sakhi
- Takhellambam Nabakumar as Birchandra, Sakhi's father
- Elangbam Indu as Sakhi's mother
- Thokchom Ongbi Jamini
- Lourembam Pishak as Mangi's grandmother
- Gurumayum Tomba
- Y. Kumarjit
- Lala
- Wangkhem Lalitkumar (Cameo appearance)

== Reception ==
Reviewing the film at the International Film Festival of India, S. R. Ashok Kumar of The Hindu wrote that "This 87 minute film is neither gripping nor enjoyable. The story has many loose ends."

Deborah Young of Variety wrote that "Simple as the story is, there is nothing expected about the way Sharma shoots it."

== Accolades ==
Sanabi won the National Film Award for Best Feature Film in Manipuri at the 43rd National Film Awards. The citation for the National Award reads, "For its apt and poetic handling of the conflict between the traditional and modern values, knitted around a pony symbolically".
