= Magi Matambakta =

2018 Manipuri film

- Movie Poster
- Directed by: Makhonmani Mongsaba
- Written by: Makhonmani Mongsaba
- Produced by: Sunita Kapoor
- Starring: Lamjingba; Khaidem Anita; Idhou
- Cinematography: Imo Yumnam
- Edited by: Yoimayai Mongsaba
- Music by: L. Nabakanta; Background Score: Jeetenkumar Naorem
- Production company: Bravura Films
- Distributed by: Bravura Films
- Release date: 2018
- Running time: 75 minutes
- Country: India
- Language: Meiteilon (officially called Manipuri language)

Magi Matambakta (English: On Her Lap) is a 2018 Manipuri film directed by Makhonmani Mongsaba and produced by Sunita Kapoor. The movie was selected for Bengaluru International Film Festival 2018; Third Eye Asian Film Festival, Mumbai, 2020 and Delhi International Film Festival 2020. The film won the Best Manipuri Film at the 2nd Jharkhand International Film Festival Awards (JIFFA) 2019.

== Synopsis ==
The movie is a story of two boys raised very differently. Eventually, they faced the results of their upbringing. The movie shows the ill-effects of helicopter parenting.

== Cast ==
- Lamjingba as Thangjam Sanathoi
- Aryan as Thangjam Henthoi
- Khaidem Anita as Ibemhal, Sanathoi's mother
- Philem Puneshori as Nungshitombi, Henthoi's mother
- Idhou as Thangjam Lukhoi, Henthoi's father
- Laishram Prakash as School Headmaster
- Takhellambam Lokendra as Salam Thoiba

== Accolades ==
Idhou (Chakpram Rameshchandra) won the Best Actor in a Supporting Role - Male and Special Jury Mention Awards at the 9th SSS MANIFA 2019. Magi Matambakta won the Best Children Film Award at the 12th Manipur State Film Awards 2019. The citation for the award reads, "The film succeeds in highlighting the physical and mental space required for children to flourish in this highly competitive world."

| Award | Category | Winner's name | Result |
|---|---|---|---|
| 8th SSS MANIFA 2019 | Best Actor in a Supporting Role - Male | Chakpram Rameshchandra (Idhou) | Won |
| 8th SSS MANIFA 2019 | Special Jury Mention | Makhonmani Mongsaba (Director); Sunita Kapoor (Producer) | Won |
| 12th Manipur State Film Awards 2019 | Special Jury Mention | Chakpram Rameshchandra | Won |
| 12th Manipur State Film Awards 2019 | Best Children Film | Makhonmani Mongsaba (Director); Sunita Kapoor (Producer) | Won |
| 2nd Jharkhand International Film Festival Awards 2019 | Best Manipuri Film | Makhonmani Mongsaba (Director); Sunita Kapoor (Producer) | Won |
