= Sanaleipak Nachom =

Meitei artists' association

- Sanaleipak Nachom Artistes Association
- Meitei: Sanaleipak Nachom
- Founded at: Imphal
- Origins: Kangleipak (Meitei for 'Manipur')
- Region served: Northeast India
- Services: Shumang Kumhei
- Methods: Shumang Kumhei
- Fields: Shumang Kumhei
- Official language: Meitei language (Manipuri language)

Sanaleipak Nachom, also known as Sanaleipak Nachom Artistes' Association or simply Sanaleibak Nachom, is a Meitei cultural association of artists of Shumang Kumhei art form of Manipur.

== Awards and honours ==
In February 2013, in the "IX Shumang Leela Ningtham Kumhei" (Meitei: ꯹ꯁꯨꯕ ꯁꯨꯃꯥꯡ ꯂꯤꯂꯥ ꯅꯤꯡꯊꯝ ꯀꯨꯝꯍꯩ) organised by the Manipur State Shumang Leela Council in the Iboyaima Shumang Leela Shanglen, artists of Sanaleipak Nachom Artistes Association achieved two awards. Artist Nilachandra won the Best Actor Award and Somorjit won the Best Actress Award.

In the 50th All Manipur Sumang Leela Festival 2021–22, organised by the Manipur State Kala Academy in the Iboyaima Shumang Leela Shanglen, Sanaleipak Nachom Artistes Association won the Best Play Award for their production "Wakhal Eronba" (also spelled as "Wakhal Irolba")(Meitei: ꯋꯥꯈꯜ ꯏꯔꯣꯜꯕ).

In March 2023, in the 51st All Manipur Shumang Leela Festival 2022–23, organised by Manipur State Kala Akademi in the Th Iboyaima Shumang Leela Shanglen, the Sanaleipak Nachom Artistes Association achieved the Best Disciplined Team status as well as the Second Best Playback Singer position (K Janeman) for their production "Panthou Mangol Khenjonglang" (Meitei: ꯄꯟꯊꯧ ꯃꯥꯡꯒꯣꯜ ꯈꯦꯟꯖꯣꯡꯂꯥꯡ).

== Events organised ==
Sanaleipak Nachom Artistes' Association organised an event named "Dances of India", in which five dances are performed simultaneously in a solo show, spreading the message of national integration and communal harmony through the means of dances. The performed dances are Manipuri classical dance, Kathak, Bharatanatyam, Odissi and Bhangra (dance). (Note: The Punjabi dance Bhangra (dance) was specifically performed for the Punjabi audiences in the event.) It was performed at the Jawaharlal Nehru Dance Academy in Imphal.

== Notable productions ==
In 2016, the Sanaleipak Nachom Artistes Association performed a play named "Mera Thaomei" (Meitei: ꯃꯦꯔꯥ ꯊꯥꯎꯃꯩ), directed by O. Praphulochand, as a part of the then annually ongoing Sangai Festival.

In 2019, "Ahingda Numit" (Meitei: ꯑꯍꯤꯡꯗ ꯅꯨꯃꯤꯠ), a play produced by the Sanaleipak Nachom Artistes Association, was selected to be one of the three Shumang Kumhei plays of the annual session 2019.

== Notable artists ==
Meitei cinema actor Denny Likmabam (Meitei: ꯗꯦꯟꯅꯤ ꯂꯤꯛꯃꯥꯕꯝ) joined Sanaleipak Nachom Artistes Association in 1997. He made his debut in the Shumang Kumhei play "Sajibugi Leihao" (Meitei: ꯁꯖꯤꯕꯨꯒꯤ ꯂꯩꯍꯥꯎ), playing the role of a police officer.

Comedian artist Shougrakpam Hemanta (Meitei: ꯁꯧꯒ꯭ꯔꯥꯛꯄꯝ ꯍꯦꯃꯟꯇ), besides being an actor by his own right, also serves as the founder secretary, president as well as the director of the Sanaleipak Nachom Artiste Association.

Meitei cinema artist Yumnam Nilachandra Singh (Meitei: ꯌꯨꯝꯅꯥꯝ ꯅꯤꯂꯆꯟꯗ꯭ꯔ ꯁꯤꯡꯍ) was also a prominent leading actor in the field of Shumang Kumhei, as a member of the Sanaleipak Nachom.

== See also ==
- Laihui Ensemble
