= Yenning Amadi Likla =

- Poster
- Directed by: Makhonmani Mongsaba
- Screenplay by: Moirangthem Inao
- Story by: Moirangthem Inao
- Produced by: SURVI (Santibala, Sunitibala, Umabati, Saroja, Victoria and Ibemhal)
- Starring: Muru Ningthoujam; Reshmi Samom; Lairenjam Olen; Huirem Seema
- Cinematography: Dilip
- Edited by: Ramu; Offline Editor: T. Ghalib; ED Vision, Manipur
- Music by: Sagolsem Tijendra; Background Score: Jeetenkumar Naorem; Audiography: A. Shantimo; Sornachand
- Production company: Nongin Films
- Distributed by: Nongin Films
- Release date: 2007
- Running time: 107 minutes
- Country: India
- Language: Meiteilon (Manipuri)

Yenning Amadi Likla (English: Spring And Dew) is a 2007 Manipuri film directed by Makhonmani Mongsaba and produced by SURVI (Santibala, Sunitibala, Umabati, Saroja, Victoria and Ibemhal), under the banner of Nongin Films. It stars Muru Ningthoujam, Huirem Seema, Lairenjam Olen and Reshmi Samom in the lead roles. The story of the film was written by Moirangthem Inao. The film was made in 16 mm and blown up in 35 mm. It was processed at Prasad Laboratory, Chennai.

Yenning Amadi Likla got entry into the feature film section of the Indian Panorama of the 39th International Film Festival of India (IFFI) 2008. It was among 21 selected feature films. The movie also got selection at 2nd Hyderabad International Film Festival 2008. It was also screened at Doordarshan Best of Indian Cinema Film Festival 2014. The film was part of the official selection at the 7th Manipur State Film Festival 2010 organised by Manipur Film Development Corporation (MFDC).

== Cast ==
- Muru Ningthoujam as Sanatomba
- Reshmi Samom as Thambal
- Lairenjam Olen as Ibohal, Sanatomba's Father
- Huirem Seema as Leibaklei, Sanatomba's Mother
- Samjetsabam Mangoljao as Ibotombi, Thambal's Father
- Daisy Kh. as Ibeyaima, Thambal's Mother
- Hamom Sadananda as Bijaya's husband
- Lilabati Chanam as Bijaya
- Lourembam Pishak (Abok Pishak) as Sanatomba's maternal grandmother
- Shougrakpam Hemanta as School Headmaster
- Chinglen Thiyam as Hotel Owner
- Rajkumar Jnaranjan (Guest Appearance)

== Soundtrack ==
Sagolsem Tijendra composed the soundtrack for the movie. Narendra Ningomba, Makhonmani Mongsaba and Moirangthem Inao wrote the lyrics. Suniti, Iraileima and Reshmi performed the chorus music. The title of the film is sung by Satyaditya as a short song.

Yenning Amadi Likla

Soundtrack album by Mandakini Takhellambam, Martin, Satyaditya, Pushparani Huidrom, Maibam Roshibina
- Released: 2007
- Genre: Feature film soundtrack
- Length: 20:12
- Label: Nongin Films
- Producer: SURVI

No.	Title	Music	Singer(s)	Length
1.	"Ho Tellanga"	Sagolsem Tijendra	Mandakini Takhellambam, Martin	05:25
2.	"Nongmadol Atiyada Naning Tamna"	Sagolsem Tijendra	Mandakini Takhellambam	05:43
3.	"Ima Wari Libiyu"	Sagolsem Tijendra	Maibam Roshibina	04:04
4.	"Eina Mirol Tarakpa"	Sagolsem Tijendra	Pushparani Huidrom	05:00
Total length:				20:12
