= Orchids of Manipur =

Orchids of Manipur (Meitei: Manipurgi Urei)
- Poster
- Directed by: Aribam Syam Sharma
- Written by: M. K. Binodini Devi
- Produced by: Sh. Tomchou Singh; Forest Department, Government of Manipur
- Cinematography: Ph. Saratchandra Sharma; A. Chitreshwar Sharma
- Edited by: Ujjal Nandy
- Music by: Aribam Syam Sharma; Sound: A. Shantimo Sharma; N. Dilip
- Production company: Manipur Film Development Corporation (MFDC) Limited
- Release date: 1993
- Running time: 24 minutes
- Country: India
- Language: Meiteilon (officially called Manipuri language)

Orchids of Manipur (Meiteilon: Manipurgi Urei) is a 1993 non-feature Manipuri film scripted by M. K. Binodini Devi and directed by Aribam Syam Sharma. It was produced by Sh. Tomchou Singh under the banner of Manipur Film Development Corporation (MFDC) Limited. The film was screened at the second edition of Fragrances from the North East 2014, a three-day festival of cinema from the northeast.

It was screened at the Yamagata International Documentary Film Festival 2019, Japan. The film also participated in International Wildlife Film Festival 1994, Morocco.

In 2025, the digitally remastered version of the film was selected for screening at the 7th Manipur Sangai Film Festival.

== Synopsis ==
The film is a journey through the rich forests of Manipur that are home to several varieties of orchids. Over four hundred species have been identified so far, and some of them are found exclusively in Manipur. The soil and climate of Manipur are conducive to the growth of orchids. Seventy percent of the varieties of orchids available in South-East Asia are found in Manipur. Orchids are of deep signifance to Manipuri culture.

However, in recent years, due to heavy deforestation, these flowers have been adversely affected and some of the major species are threatened with extinction. The Forst Department of the Government of Manipur is taking steps for the preservation of the orchids.

== Accolades ==
The film won the National Film Award for Best Non-Feature Environment/Conservation/Preservation Film at the 41st National Film Awards. The citation for the National Award reads, "For a colourful and extremely aesthetic presentation of the exalting abundance of the wild orchids of Manipur".
