= List of Meitei-language newspapers =

Part of a series on

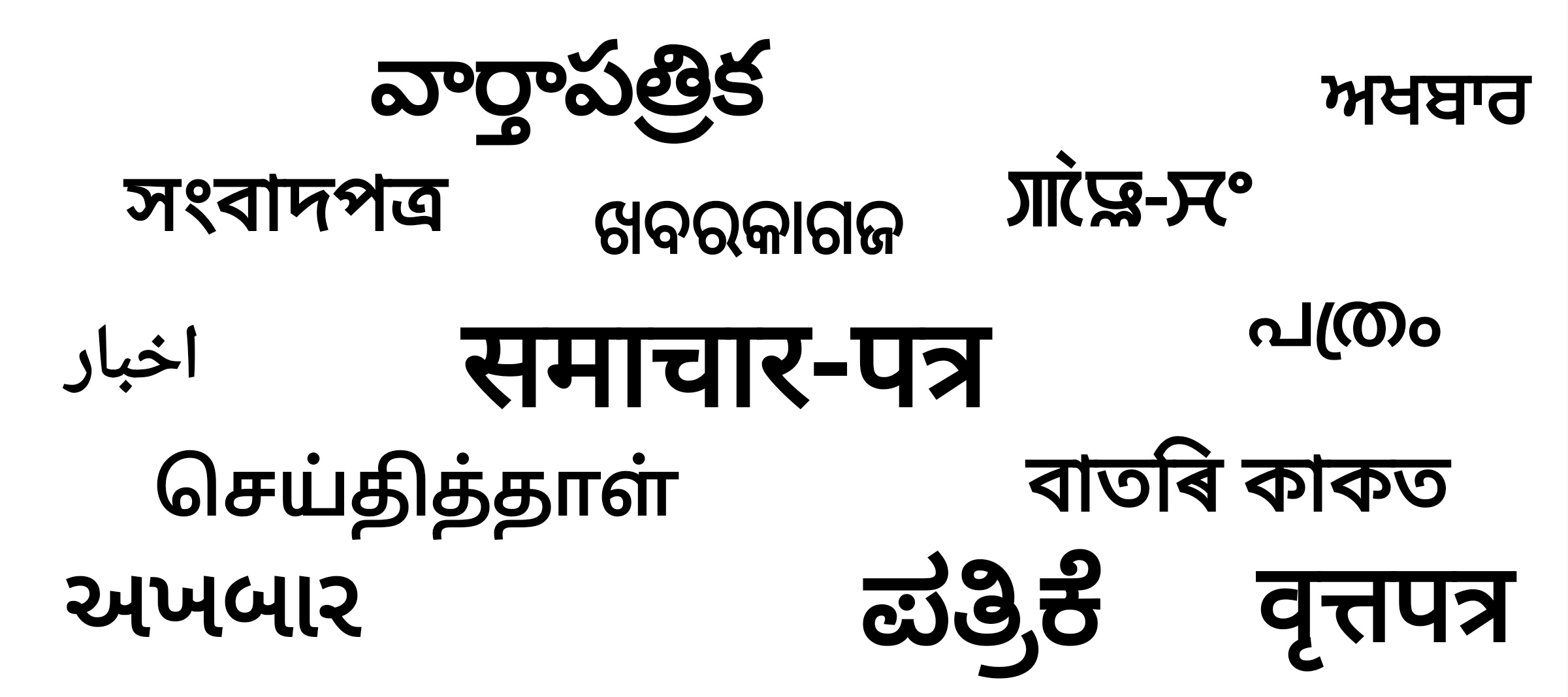

Newspapers of India
Category
Newspapers by languages
- Assamese
- Bengali
- Gujarati
- Hindi
- Kannada
- Malayalam
- Marathi
- Meitei (Manipuri)
- Punjabi
- Tamil
- Telugu
Related
- Newspapers by readership
- Registrar of Newspapers for India
- The Indian Newspaper Society

The Meitei language (officially known as Manipuri language) has a long history of literature and culture. Meitei language newspapers are either printed in Meitei or in Bengali or even in both. The following are some of the notable Meitei language newspapers published and circulated across Manipur, Assam and Tripura states of Northeast India as well as across some parts of Bangladesh and Canada.

All Manipuri language newspapers will be using the Meitei (Meitei: Meetei Mayek) instead of Bengali from 15 January 2023; 3 years ago, according to a joint meeting consensus of the "Meetei Erol Eyek Loinasillol Apunba Lup" (MEELAL), "All Manipur Working Journalists’ Union" (AMWJU) and "Editors' Guild Manipur" (EGM) in Imphal.

Newspapers	City	Established	Script (Meitei or Bengali)	Online version	Physical paper available	Note(s)
Bangladesh
Enaat	Sylhet, Bangladesh		Bengali	Official website	No	
Canada
Manipuri Mirror	Longueuil, Quebec, Canada		Bengali	Official website	No	A Bengali language edition is also published
India
Arambai	Guwahati, Assam		Bengali		Yes	
E-Pao	online		Meitei	Official website	No	
Hueiyen Lanpao	Imphal, Manipur		Both	Official website	Yes	
Ichel Express		2015	Both	Official website	Yes	Morning daily
Imphal Times	Imphal	2013		Official website	Yes	Evening daily
Ireibak	Imphal	2003	Both	Official website	No	Daily
Janata			Bengali		Yes	
Kangla Pao		1991	Bengali	Official website	Yes	Evening daily
Kangleipakki Meira		1979	Bengali		Yes	Began as a weekly paper in 1979 and later became a daily.
Khollao	Imphal		Bengali		Yes	
Mannaba			Bengali	Official website	No	
Marup	Agartala, Tripura		Bengali		Yes	First Manipuri weekly newspaper in Tripura
Matam			Bengali		Yes	
Matamgi Yakairol	Imphal		Bengali		Yes	
Meeyam		1985	Bengali		Yes	An evening daily
Naharolgi Thoudang			Both	Official website	Yes	
Ngasi			Bengali		Yes	
Ningtam Lanpao			Bengali		Yes	
Nongalakpa			Bengali		No	
Pandam			Bengali		Yes	Monthly publication
Pandam Daily		2013	Bengali		Yes	Daily newspaper
Paojel			Bengali		Yes	
Paonilkhon	Imphal	1990	Bengali		Yes	Evening daily
Poknapham, a.k.a. The People's Chronicle		1975	Both	Official website	Yes	
Prajatantra	Imphal		Bengali		Yes	
Punshi		1982	Bengali		Yes	Evening daily
Samantra Patrika			Bengali		Yes	
Sanaleibak			Bengali	Official website	Yes	
Sangai Express	Imphal		Both	Official website	Yes	
Thoudok Wathok			Bengali		Yes	Imphal based weekly newspaper
Toknga	Imphal		Bengali		Yes	

== See also ==
- Imphal Free Press
