= Ashangba Nongjabi =

2003 Manipuri film

- Official poster
- Directed by: Aribam Syam Sharma
- Written by: M. K. Binodini Devi
- Produced by: Aribam Syam Sharma
- Starring: Bhogen; Khuraijam Lingjelthoibi; Ningthoujam Rina
- Cinematography: Irom Maipak
- Edited by: Leichiklen
- Music by: Aribam Syam Sharma
- Production company: Aribam Syam Sharma Productions
- Release date: 2003
- Running time: 63 minutes
- Country: India
- Language: Meiteilon (Manipuri)

Ashangba Nongjabi (English: Crimson Rainclouds) is a 2003 Manipuri film written by M. K. Binodini Devi. It is produced and directed by Aribam Syam Sharma. Bhogen, Khuraijam Lingjelthoibi and Ningthoujam Rina played lead roles in the movie. The movie is based on M. K. Binodini Devi's 1966 play of the same title. The play draws on the playwright’s interactions with Ramkinkar Baij, the eminent sculptor, with whom she studied in Santiniketan, and who has left behind a whole suite of sculptures and paintings of Binodini.

== Synopsis ==
Determined to uphold his freedom, Gautam, an artist, is torn between his two loves, who are both gentle in their demands yet deeply caring. A sensitive man, he chooses art, knowing that he is disappointing them both. Indu would like him to change his lifestyle slightly for recognition and comfort, while Keinatombi would be happy to provide the minimal care and comfort she believes he needs for his art. For the time being, at least, Gautam will go with her.

== Cast ==
- Bhogen as Gautam
- Khuraijam Lingjelthoibi as Indu
- Ningthoujam Rina as Keinatombi
- Kangabam Tomba as Indu's Uncle
- Huirem Manglem as Gautam's customer

== Books ==
In 1967, a collection of three plays by M. K. Binodini Devi under the title Ashangba Nongjabi was published. A book on the English translation of the play named as Crimson Rainclouds by L. Somi Roy, the writer's son, was also published.
