= Imphal Free Press =

Indian News Paper

- Type: Daily newspaper
- Format: Broadsheet
- Owner: Mayengbam Satyajit Singh
- Editor: Irengbam Arun
- Founded: April 1996
- Political alignment: Centre-left
- Language: English
- Headquarters: Imphal
- City: Manipur
- Country: India
- Circulation: 285,579
- Website: ifp.co.in

Imphal Free Press is an English-language daily published in Manipur, India. Alongside The Sangai Express, it is one of the two most widely read newspapers of Manipur. It is considered as one of the "good quality" newspapers, among approximately 40 papers in the state of Manipur.

== History ==
The original Imphal Free Press was owned by Sapam Nishikanta. In 1996, Pradip Phanjoubam left the company and started his own paper under the name Imphal Free Press. Sapam Nishikanta continued publishing under the names Manipur Free Press that turned into the Sangai Express, now the main competitor of the Imphal Free Press.

Phanjoubam edited the new Imphal Free Press till about 2012. By 2020, Phanjoubam ceased his connection with the paper, and Mayengbam Satyajit Singh was mentioned as its publisher. Other editors that are mentioned as having worked with the newspaper are Dhiren A. Sadokpam, and Chitra Ananthem.

== Attacks ==
In 2006, a faction of the Kangleipak Communist Party forced a ban of three months on the Imphal Free Press. On 11 November 2008, an Imphal Free Press editor, Konsam Rishikant, was assassinated.

In 2020, the government of N. Biren Singh prosecuted the Imphal Free Press for criminal defamation, just for reporting the opinion poll results of Singh. The paper had to raise Rs. 350,000 in legal fees and other costs to defend itself.

== See also ==
- Hueiyen Lanpao
- Naharolgi Thoudang
- Poknapham
- Sangai Express
- List of Meitei-language newspapers
