= Suresh Sharma =

Indian cricketer (born 1944)

Personal information
- Full name: Suresh Kumar Sharma
- Born: 10 June 1944; India
- Role: Batsman

Career statistics
Competition	First-class
Matches	3
Runs scored	37
Batting average	7.40
100s/50s	0/0
Top score	35
Catches/stumpings	0/0
- Source: ESPNcricinfo

Suresh Kumar Sharma (born 10 June 1944) was an Indian cricketer from Northern Punjab. He was a right-handed batsman and played first-class cricket for only one season.
