= Shumang Kumhei =

Art form of Manipur, India

Sumang Kumhei (Meitei: /sū.máŋ kūm-hə́i/), also known as Sumang Leela (Meitei for 'Courtyard Play'), is a Meitei traditional form of theatre, usually performed in Manipur, North East India. The theatre is arranged in the form of open air from four sides. The roles are all played by male actors, some dressed as beautiful ladies. The role of male characters are played by female artists in case of female theatre groups. This traditional theatre form was prevalent since the time of monarchical rule in Manipur. But the proper form of Shumang Leela had its inception in 1895 A.D.

The present day Shumang Leelas address the issues of moral values, unity and integrity. The fostering of bonds of brotherhood and friendship among various communities in the State is also promoted by the theatre.

In 2017, Shougrakpam Hemanta was conferred with the prestigious Sangeet Natak Akademi Award in recognition of his contribution in Shumang Leela. With this, he became the first person to receive the award for this art form.

== Observance ==
An annual event, Shumang Leela Day, commemorates the art form. The Iboyaima Shumang Leela Lifetime Achievement Award is presented on this day.

== Notable artists ==
- Chinglen Thiyam
- Shougrakpam Hemanta
- Iboyaima Khuman
- Bishesh Huirem
- Gokul Athokpam
- Gurumayum Bonny
- Narendra Ningombam

== See also ==
- Sanaleipak Nachom
- List of Shumang Kumhei actors
