= Poknapham =

Indian Meitei language daily newspaper

- Type: Daily newspaper
- Format: Broadsheet
- Owner: Gurumayum Shantikumari Devi
- Publisher: Gurumayum Shantikumari Devi
- Editor: A Robindro Sharma
- Founded: 1 February 1975
- Language: Meitei language (official called Manipuri language)
- Headquarters: Imphal
- Website: www.poknapham.in

Poknapham is the most-read Meitei language newspaper published in Bengali script, from Imphal, Manipur in India. Poknapham means Birthplace in Meitei. It is owned and published by Gurumayum Shantikumari Devi from Keishampat Thiyam Leirak, Imphal and printed by her at Padma Printers, Imphal. A Robindro Sharma is the Editor.

Started in 1975, the daily is now published from Imphal, Manipur.

The online version of Poknapham was launched in June 2008 and is the first Meitei language newspaper to go online.

== See also ==
- Hueiyen Lanpao
- Naharolgi Thoudang
- The Sangai Express
- List of Meitei-language newspapers
