= Makhonmani Mongsaba =

Manipuri author, actor, producer and director

- Born: 1 March 1959; Uripok Achom Leikai, Imphal, Manipur, India
- Occupations: Author, Actor, Producer, Director
- Parent(s): Modhusudon Mongsatabam; Amumacha Mongsatabam
- Awards: National Film Award for Best Feature Film in Manipuri (2000); Sahitya Akademi Award (2013)

Makhonmani Mongsaba (born 1 March 1959) is an Indian author, actor, producer and director from Imphal, Manipur. He got his doctorate degree from Manipur University. In 2013, he won the prestigious Sahitya Akademi Award for his book Chinglon Amadagi Amada, a travelogue. He published the book Matamgi Manipur:The First Manipuri Feature Film by Bobby Wahengbam under the name Angomningthou Preservation and Documentation. It won the Best Book on Cinema at the 65th National Film Awards 2018 and both the writer and the publisher received the Swarna Kamal award.

He had scripted a Shumang Kumhei titled Malemnganbi. He had been a jury member of 51st National Film Awards 2003 and 57th National Film Awards 2009 organised by Directorate of Film Festivals, New Delhi. He was a jury member (feature film category) at the 52nd International Film Festival of India 2021.

== Career ==
Mongsaba started writing short stories at a very young age. His first love is literature. In 1987, he joined Chorus Repertory Theatre, Imphal as an actor and acted plays under the guidance of Ratan Thiyam. The theatre troupe traveled to many places in India and abroad to participate in international theatre festivals from 1987 to 1995. He has also acted in movies and played lead roles. In the 1998 movie Shingnaba, he played a Thang-Ta teacher. Apart from feature films, he has acted in teleplays produced by Doordarshan Manipur, namely Ishor Na Khangsanu and Changyengduda.

In 2000, he directed and produced Chatledo Eidi. The movie was selected for Indian Panorama of the 32nd International Film Festival of India 2001 and bagged the National Film Award for Best Feature Film in Manipuri. His 2007 directorial venture Yenning Amadi Likla was also selected for Indian Panorama of the 39th International Film Festival of India. He directed Nangna Kappa Pakchade which was released in 2013. It is a film on women empowerment and written by M. K. Binodini Devi. Mongsaba's 2018 movie Magi Matambakta participated in Delhi International Film Festival and Bengaluru International Film Festival. It won the Best Manipuri Film at the Jharkhand International Film Festival.

As an author, he wrote two books of short story collections namely Neengsinglubada and Nupee Keithel, and a book on the critical study on language namely Waheigi Saklon. He has also written a book on poetry titled Thong Nambonbi; two essays namely Manipuri Sanskritida Pena and Mannadaba Maithongshing. His book Chinglon Amadagi Amada, a travelogue, earned him a Sahitya Akademi Award in 2013.

== Filmography ==
Year	Film	Role	Ref.
1994	Mayophygee Macha	Actor	
1998	Shingnaba	Actor	
1999	Thawaigi Thawai	Actor	
2000	Chatledo Eidi	Producer, director	
2002	Laibakthibi	Director	
2007	Yenning Amadi Likla	Director	
2013	Nangna Kappa Pakchade	Director	
2018	Magi Matambakta	Director	
