= Naharolgi Thoudang =

Meitei language newspaper

- Type: daily newspaper
- Format: both paper and e-paper
- Editor: Khoirom Loyalakpa
- Language: Meitei language (officially called Manipuri language)
- Headquarters: Keishampat Airport Road, Imphal 795 001
- City: Imphal
- Country: India
- Circulation: India (physical copy); Global (e-copy)
- Website: naharolgithoudang.co.in

The Naharolgi Thoudang (Meitei for 'Duty of the youths') is an Indian Meitei language daily newspaper, circulated mainly in the Northeast Indian state of Manipur. Since Meitei language is written predominantly in both Meitei script and Bengali script, Naharolgi Thoudang is printed in different editions of the two writing systems.

== History ==
In 1992, Naharolgi Thoudang (Meitei: ꯅꯍꯥꯔꯣꯜꯒꯤ ꯊꯧꯗꯥꯡ) was founded by Nongthombam Biren Singh, the present Chief Minister of Manipur, after resigning from the Border Security Force (BSF). He worked as the editor of the newspaper publishing house till 2001 before entering into political career. In April 2000, Biren Singh once spent 20 days in jail, after being caught for publishing articles written by a human rights activist which was a criticism of the then ruling government. The Committee to Protect Journalists (CPJ) had been advocating for the journalists' freedom of expression, thereby supporting Biren Singh.

== Awards and honours ==
In September 2015, Kshetri Meghajit (Meitei: ꯈꯦꯇ꯭ꯔꯤ ꯃꯦꯘꯖꯤꯠ), a journalist of Naharolgi Thoudang, was one of the 6 people, who achieved the annual Media Fellowship Award, instituted by the Manipur Tourism Forum.

Herojit Nongmaithem (Meitei: ꯍꯦꯔꯣꯖꯤꯠ ꯅꯣꯡꯃꯥꯏꯊꯦꯝ), a columnist of Naharolgi Thoudang, achieved the prestigious RK Maipaksana Journalist Fellowship, 2016, instituted by the RK Maipaksana Memorial Trust.

Kshetri Meghajit (Meitei: ꯈꯦꯇ꯭ꯔꯤ ꯃꯦꯘꯖꯤꯠ), the Sub-Editor of Naharolgi Thoudang was given the Manipur State Journalist Award, 2020 for best Parliamentary reporting, by the Department of Information and Public Relations, Government of Manipur, on the National Press Day, 2020.

== Help from others ==
The head machine man of Naharolgi Thoudang was financially helped by the All Manipur Newspaper and Electronic Media Employees Association (AMNEMEA), as the daily newspaper temporarily stopped working since 7 June 2023.

== Assault and battery ==
In July 2007, there were assault and battery in the offices of Hueiyen Lanpao, The Sangai Express and Naharolgi Thoudang.

In December 2011, there were grenade attacks on the offices of The Sangai Express and Naharolgi Thoudang.

In October 2021, Elangbam Rameshwor, a Thoubal correspondent of Naharolgi Thoudang and vice president of the Thoubal District Working Journalist Union, was allegedly physically assaulted by some workers of Indian National Congress party at his own home in Heirok. Afterwards, the incident was strongly condemned by the Bharatiya Janata Party (BJP) members of Thoubal district. It was also condemned by the Indian Journalist Union (IJU), Manipur Hills Journalists’ Union (MHJU), as well as Ukhrul District Working Journalists’ Association (UDWJA).

In September 2022, Wayenbam Johnson, a journalist of Naharolgi Thoudang, was physically assaulted by a group of people, even after showing his identity card, while trying to take news reports of a violence that happened in Hatta, Imphal.

== See also ==
- Hueiyen Lanpao
- Poknapham
- The Sangai Express
- Imphal Free Press
- List of Meitei-language newspapers
