= Hueiyen Lanpao =

Meitei language newspaper

Hueiyen Lanpao (Meitei: /hūē-ī-yen lān-pāō/)
- messenger to the masses (Note: It is mentioned in the official website)
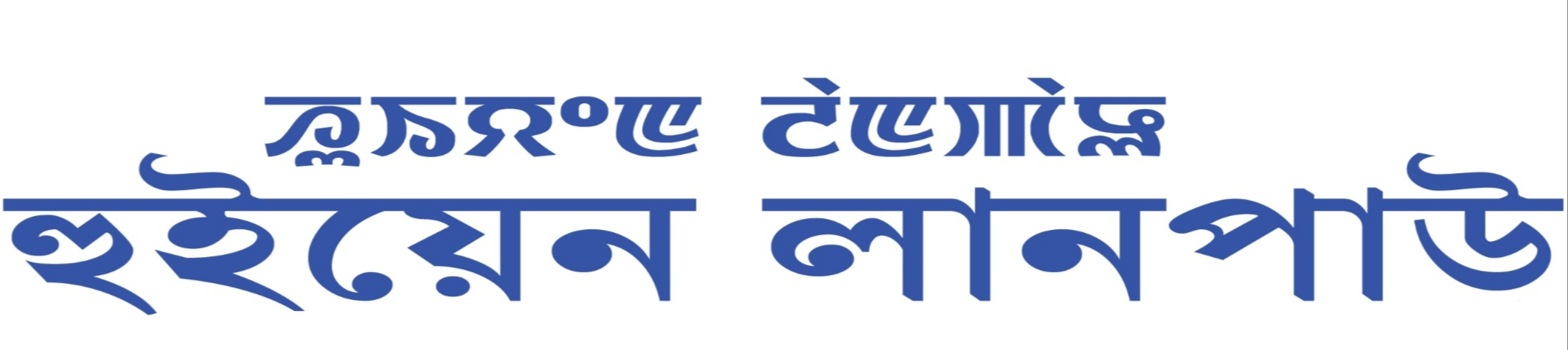
- Type: daily newspaper
- Owner: Soubam Niladhaja Singh
- Founded: 1978
- Language: Meiteilon (Manipuri) (Note: They used to use the term "Manipuri" to refer to the Meitei language (in Bengali script) and the term "Meetei Mayek" to refer to the same language (in Meitei script).)
- Headquarters: Sega Road, Thouda Bhabok Leikai, Imphal - 795001, Manipur
- City: Imphal
- Country: India
- Circulation: India (physical version); Global (online version)
- Sister newspapers: Hueiyen Lanpao (English edition)
- Website: hueiyenlanpao.com (Bengali script edition)

Hueiyen Lanpao is a Manipuri-language morning daily newspaper headquartered in Imphal, Manipur. Established in 1978, it is among the oldest newspapers in Manipur and the wider North Eastern region of India. Across nearly five decades, the newspaper has reported on the many dimensions of life in Manipur, from politics and governance to education, employment, business, agriculture, sport, culture, literature and social life.

== The Newspaper ==
Detail	Information
Publisher & Owner	Soubam Niladhaja Singh
Editor	Maibam Dhanabir Meitei
Head office	Sega Road, Thouda Bhabok Leikai, Imphal – 795001, Manipur, India
RNI Registration No.	40746/1978
ABC	Certified No. 142/2131
INS	Code No. 51429
MRUCI	Member
DIPR, Government of Manipur	Empanelled and certified as an “A” Grade morning daily
CBC, Ministry of Information and Broadcasting, Government of India	Empanelled member; CBC Code: 550001

== Rules and regulations ==
As of October 2011, the Hueiyen Lanpao had laid its rules and regulations regarding media publicity as follows:

1) All those who submit press releases in Hueiyen Lanpao office are requested to submit three copies of the same along with necessary seal and signature.
2) Anybody submitting press releases or mails in compliance with the code of conduct of AMWJU are requested to ensure the same reach the office of Hueiyen Lanpao by 8 pm.
3) Programme organizers are requested to ensure the invitations reach the office of Hueiyen Lanpao at least a day in advance of the programme date.
4) If any of the press notes, mails or news of the programmes do not conform to the above stated norms, we request individuals and organizations not to mind if the same is not published or the programme not covered.
Moreover, whether a news report or coverage should be carried or not would depend on the situation/circumstances.
5) No one should give any money or gift to any news staff of Hueiyen Lanpao when they come to cover news and individual or organizations concern are requested not to bear no ill-feeling if such paid news is not carried.
Huieyen Lanpao, once again, reaffirms its stand not to entertain any paid news.
6) News items would be carried in consideration of their worth even without gifts or money, and the notion that a news item would not be published without being paid should be given up.

== Awards and honours ==
Over the years, Hueiyen Lanpao and its journalists have received a number of recognitions. Presented here is a record of those awards, honours and contributions, and of the people and initiatives that have been part of Hueiyen Lanpao's journey.

=== 2025 | National Press Day ===
Kumari Alka Thokchom — recognised for Sports Reporting on National Press Day 2025.

=== 2022 | Manipur State Journalist Award ===
Khumukcham Joychand Singh, Sub-Editor of Hueiyen Lanpao — Manipur State Journalist Award 2022 for Sports Reporting.

=== 2020 | Manipur State Journalist Award ===
Ashem Babycha Devi — Manipur State Journalist Award 2020 for Rural Reporting.

=== 2018 | State Journalist Awards ===
Five journalists of Hueiyen Lanpao were recognised in their respective fields:

● Ratneshwori Goswami — Sports

● Bijoy Laishram — Public Health & Hygiene

● Puyam Romeshwar — Parliamentary Reporting

● Ashem Babycha — Women & Children

● Naorem Gyanand — Art & Culture

=== 2015 | Manipur State Journalist Awards ===
In 2015, four of the eight Manipur State Journalist Awards instituted by the Directorate of Information and Public Relations (DIPR), Government of Manipur, went to journalists of Hueiyen Lanpao. The four awardees were honoured on National Press Day, 16 November 2015.

● Gyanand Naorem — Rural Reporting

● Mutum Rameshchandra — Public Health & Hygiene

● Ashem Babycha — Women & Child

● Wangkhem Rishikesh — Sports Reporting

=== Eco Journalist Award 2015 ===
Nomita Khongbantabam, a senior staff member of Hueiyen Lanpao, received the Eco Journalist Award 2015 on World Environment Day from the Manipur Pollution Control Board (MPCB), Lamphelpat, Imphal.

=== Chingsubam Akaba Memorial Journalist Award ===
Meisnam Karnajit received the Chingsubam Akaba Memorial Journalist Award 2014–15 during the 71st birth anniversary observance of late Chingsubam Akaba at Thawai village under Phungyar Assembly Constituency, Ukhrul district.

=== 2014 | Rural Reporting ===
Laishram Bijoy — State Journalist Award for Rural Reporting, 2014.

=== 2013 | Editorial & Reporting Awards ===
Satyajit Usham, Editor of the Hueiyen Lanpao English edition, received the Best Editor honour for his writings on national integration and communal harmony.

Two other journalists of the publication received State Journalist Awards that year:

● Ratneshwori Goswami — Sports Reporting

● Maisnam Karnajit — Health & Hygiene Reporting

Laishram Bijoy also received the Seram Mangi Journalist Award in 2013.

=== 2011 | Science, Technology & Rural Reporting ===
Two Hueiyen Lanpao staff reporters received the State Journalist Award in 2011:

● Amukhomba Ngangbam — Science & Technology Reporting

● Ningthoukhongjam Sanajaoba Meetei — Rural Reporting

Both were recognised on National Press Day.

Amukhomba Ngangbam also received the RK Sanatomba Journalist Award 2011, given by the family of late RK Sanatomba, an editor of Kangla Lanpao, under the RK Sanatomba Memorial Trust, Imphal.

=== 2010 | Best Female Reporter ===
In 2010, Hueiyen Lanpao staff reporter Salam Kamala was honoured as the “Best Female Reporter of 2009” during the 28th Foundation Day of the evening daily Kangleipaki Meira.

=== Institutional Honours ===
In September 2011, the publisher, editor and staff members of Hueiyen Lanpao were felicitated by Major General Binoy Poonnen, VSM, GOC, Red Shield Division, during the publication's third anniversary for their:

“courage in honest and truthful reporting without fear or favour in both its English and vernacular editions.”

On its fourth Foundation Day in September 2012, Hueiyen Lanpao was honoured in the presence of Leishemba Sanajaoba, Maharaja of Manipur; Moirangthem Okendro, then Minister of Education and Consumer Affairs, Food & Public Distribution; RV Mingthing, former Minister of the Government of Manipur; Satyajit Singh, then President of the North American Bangladesh Manipuri Society; and Hamom Promud, then President of THE MANIPURI (Manipuri Cultural Development, Promotion & Study Centre), Canada.

=== Leepun | Honouring the People of the Press ===
Hueiyen Lanpao also recognises the people whose work and commitment have contributed to the Press and its wider community.

Each year, on its Foundation Day, Hueiyen Lanpao celebrates Leepun, honouring journalists, columnists, contributors and others who have served and contributed to the Press. The observance is an occasion to acknowledge their work and the collective contribution of those who have been part of journalism and public discourse over the years

=== Literature & Literary Recognition ===
==== Felicitation of Jodhachandra Sharma ====
In 2013, the Hueiyen Lanpao Group of Publications felicitated Jodhachandra Sharma, a columnist of its English edition, following his Sahitya Akademi Award 2012 for the novel Mathou Kanba DNA.

He was presented with a shawl and memento by the Group.

==== Hueiyen Lanpao Literary Award ====
Hueiyen Lanpao instituted the Hueiyen Lanpao Literary Award as an annual recognition for writers of Meitei literature.

● 2013 — Longjam Joychandra, the first recipient, for his 2009 work of literary criticism Manipuri Sahitya

● 2014 — Irungbam Deven, for his book of poems Numit Ama, Punsi Ama

=== Traditional Arts & Culture ===
==== Hueiyen Rendezvous ====
Hueiyen Rendezvous, held at the Literary Hall of the Hueiyen Lanpao office, provided a space for traditional performing arts including Pena, Khongjom Parva and Moirang Sai.

The programme formed part of efforts to give visibility to and encourage the continuation of indigenous and endangered performing traditions of Meitei culture.

==== Pena & Khongjom Parva ====
In February 2013, the Hueiyen Lanpao Columnists' Forum submitted a memorandum to the Commissioner of Art & Culture, Government of Manipur, seeking recognition of Pena and Khongjom Parva in the curriculum and syllabus of the Government Music College.

The memorandum also called for a legal policy for the preservation of other endangered traditional arts and cultural elements of Manipur.

=== Heritage & Documentation ===
==== Sana Konung ====
In 2013, Hueiyen Lanpao conducted a public opinion survey in connection with the Manipur State Cabinet's decision concerning Sana Konung (Royal Palace) and its proposed conversion into a historical monument. As part of the initiative, the publication interviewed the five queen consorts of the late King Bodhchandra of the Manipur Kingdom, recording their perspectives concerning Sana Konung and its history.

=== Language, Education & Young People ===
==== Essay Competition | 2012 ====
To mark the fourth Foundation Day of its English and Meetei Mayek editions, the Hueiyen Lanpao Group of Publications organised a student essay competition on the theme:

“Meeteilon Eikhoina Yokhatkadabani, Leingakpasingtana Chaokhathanba Ngamloi”

The theme expressed the view that the development of Meeteilon required the participation of its community and could not rest with government agencies alone.

==== Painting Competition | 2012 ====
In October–November 2012, Hueiyen Lanpao organised a painting competition at its Literary Hall. More than 200 students from Classes III to V, representing educational institutions across Manipur, participated in two categories.

== Community Engagement ==
=== Assam & Meghalaya Flood Relief | 2014 ===
In October 2014, the Hueiyen Lanpao Group of Publications, together with the Far East India Solidarity Forum, received public donations for the Assam & Meghalaya Flood Relief Fund to support communities affected by floods in the two states.

Assistance to Individuals

Over the years, Hueiyen Lanpao has extended financial and other assistance to individuals and families facing illness, accidents and difficult circumstances. The identities of individual beneficiaries are not listed here in keeping with their privacy.

=== Maanaba Khunai ===
Through its initiative Maanaba Khunai, Hueiyen Lanpao has extended individual support to folk artists, musicians, sportspersons and others from different walks of life.

=== Environment & Wildlife ===
Hueiyen Lanpao's engagement with environmental issues has included both journalism and community activity. In 2015, senior staff member Nomita Khongbantabam received the Eco Journalist Award from the Manipur Pollution Control Board on World Environment Day.

In May 2013, members of Hueiyen Lanpao, together with People for Animal (PFA), Thoubal, helped rescue an injured barking deer at Moirang Kokibon Leikai.

The deer had suffered a broken left hind limb after falling into a water reservoir. Following its rescue, the authorities of Keibul Lamjao National Park and the Manipur Zoological Garden were informed.

== Hacking of official website incident ==
On 28 September 2010, the host server used by the official website of Hueiyen Lanpao was hacked. The site was restored to normalcy the next day

== Assault and battery ==
=== Assault on office ===
In July 2007, there was an incident involving assault and battery in the offices of Hueiyen Lanpao, The Sangai Express and Naharolgi Thoudang.

=== Assault on staff members ===
In August 2015, Willar Leimapokpam, a staff member of Hueiyen Lanpao (English Edition) was physically assaulted by five police commandos, who were later enquired by the authorities concerned, after "All Manipur Working Journalists Union" (AMWJU) had set a deadline of 48 hours to take required actions against the policemen involved in the crime.
