= Hamom Sadananda =

Indian actor and singer from Manipur

- Born: Hamom Sadananda; 16 February; Sega Road, Thouda Bhabok Leikai, Imphal, Manipur
- Occupations: Actor, singer
- Parent(s): Hamom Muhindro; Hamom Ongbi Indubala

Hamom Sadananda is an Indian actor and singer who appears in Manipuri films. He is a resident of Sega Road, Thouda Bhabok Leikai, Imphal, Manipur. He has acted in more than 100 Manipuri films. Besides acting and singing in films, he also performs Manipuri Sankirtana on various Manipur occasions. Ingengi Atiya, Chumthang Makhong, Sakthibee Tampha, Natephamda Tero, Manithoiba are some of his famous movies.

== Career ==
Hamom Sadananda acted as a child artist in the 1993 film Sambal Wangma. He started his career initially in singing and then later became a successful actor in Manipuri cinema. His first film is Ingengi Atiya (The Sky of Autumn). He has now done more than 100 films. Among his popular films are Ingengi Atiya, Manithoiba, Chumthang Makhong, Imagi Laman Singamdre, Khuji, Thoiba Thoibi and Mami Sami. He has also produced a music video titled Engao Ngaojabi which stars Bonium Thokchom and Eshita Yengkhom.

In Chumthang Makhong and Ekhenglaktagi Red Rose, he played the role of militants. He played a cancer patient in the film Da Sadananda. In films like Eidee Lankhide and Khongthang-gi Makhol, he played antagonistic roles.

His role of Achouba, a brain tumor patient who sacrifices everything for his mother and his brothers in the film Hingbagee Mahao, earned him a Best Actor in a Leading Role - Male award at the 5th SSS MANIFA 2016.

== Accolades ==
Hamom Sadananda has won a number of awards. He was honoured with the title Brother of the Disabled by the authority of the Disabled Development Association, Manipur (DDAM) in February 2015.

Award	Category	Film	Ref.
3rd RJ Films Vision Special Award 2009	Best Actor	–	
7th Manipur State Film Festival 2010	Best Male Playback Singer for the song "Houda Houjillu"	Nobap	
8th Manipur State Film Festival 2013	Special Jury Mention	Imagi Laman Singamdre	
3rd SSS MANIFA 2014	Best Actor in a Supporting Role	Tabunungda Akaiba Likli	
3rd SSS MANIFA 2014	Best Male Playback Singer	Tabunungda Akaiba Likli	
5th SSS MANIFA 2016	Best Actor in a Leading Role - Male	Hingbagee Mahao	

== Off-screen work ==
Hamom Sadananda was the brand ambassador of Kaizen Sports along with Soma Laishram and Oinam Bembem Devi.

== Selected filmography ==
Year	Film	Role	Director
2002	Ingengi Atiya (The Sky of Autumn)	Tompok	Khwairakpam Bishwamittra
2004	Reporter	Chingkhei	L. Surjakanta
2005	Laang	Sashi	Moirangthem Inao
2005	Matang Chabada Hairage	Rishi	Ksh. Kishorekumar
2005	Nangtana Helli	Rajesh	Oken Amakcham
2005	Laibakkee Chandan	Vikas	O. Gautam
2005	Nanga Thengnaramdraba	Rajiv	Ak. Gyaneshori
2006	Tang 24	Dino	Vir Bhadra Yumnam
2006	Payal	Roshan	Amar Raj
2006	Khuji	Chingkhei	Romi Meitei
2006	Eshworgee Khudol	Abung	Diya Khwairakpam
2006	Eedom Chatcharage	Dr. Hemba	Amar Raj
2006	Sakthibee Tampha	Ningthem	Diya Khwairakpam
2007	Yenning Amadi Likla	Bijaya's husband	Makhonmani Mongsaba
2007	Meitei Chanu	Tompok	Amar Raj
2007	Akhunba Mani	Malangba	Romi Meitei
2007	Manithoiba	Manithoiba	Romi Meitei
2007	Meera Memcha	Sadananda	Mohendro
2007	Lengdaba Lan	Yoihenba	Romi Meitei
2008	Malla Malla Leinungshi	Nganba	Amar Raj
2008	Chumthang Makhong	Priyoranjan	Romi Meitei
2008	Ekhenglaktagi Red Rose	Nganba	Romi Meitei
2008	Mami Sami	Wangthoi	Ningthouja Lancha
2008	Echan	Henba	Amar Raj
2008	Ningthem	Lemba	Khwairakpam Bishwamittra
2009	Khangdreda Nongdamba	Mukhan	Romi Meitei
2009	Kaboklei	Pamheiba	Pilu H.
2009	Eigee Morambee	Ngouba	Rajen Leishangthem
2009	Khongthang-gi Makhol	Krishnakanta	O. Gautam
2010	Thoicha	Ibohal	Ningthoujam Prem
2010	Ashit Awanthada Pee Thadoi Ahum	Chaoren	Romi Meitei
2010	Aabirkhan	Bir Singh	Pilu H.
2010	Imagi Laman Singamdre	Thouna	Romi Meitei
2011	Mongpham	Nongdamba	Lai Jiten
2011	Lanphamda Ibeni	Loya	Romi Meitei
2012	Cheitheng	Chingkhei	Chan Heisnam
2012	Boiton Mangkhre	Poirei	Khoibam Homeshwori
2013	Tabunungda Akaiba Likli	Businessman	Romi Meitei
2014	Meerang Mahum	Pathou	Ajit Ningthouja
2015	Nungshit Mapi	Fake CBI Officer	Ajit Ningthouja
2015	Nangna Nokpa Yengningi	Memi's brother	Ajit Ningthouja
2015	Hingbagee Mahao	Achouba	Jeetendra Ningomba
2016	Konggol	Ayeengbi's husband	Ajit Ningthouja
2016	Thaba	Ibosana	Devbrata Samurai & Dpak Manohar
2016	Sor	Usha's brother	Ajit Ningthouja
2017	Mani Mamou	Dr. Loyumba	Ajit Ningthouja
2018	Tomthin	Sanatomba Ningthoujam	Ojitbabu Ningthoujam
2018	Amuktang-ga Haikho	Loya	Romi Meitei
2018	Soinairaba Thamoi	Khogen	Pilu H.
2018	Leichilda Pallaba Thaja	Chaoba	Pilu H.
2018	Chingda Satpi Engellei	Dr. Ibomcha	Bobby Haobam
2019	Khurai Angaobi	Lanchenba	Sudhir Kangjam
2021	Amuba Kundo	Malem	Luwang Kanglei
2022	Nongallamdaisida	Ningthem	O. Gautam
2022	Hoo Sangom	Lemba	Ojitbabu Ningthoujam
2022	Ningol	Sajou	L. Surjakanta
2024	Boong	Joykumar	Lakshmipriya Devi
2024	Leishna		Hemanta Khuman
2025	Thamoigi Atiya		Bijgupta Laishram
2025	Shaktam	Thoithoi	Ojitbabu Ningthoujam
2025	Khangpoksang Gee Sha		Naocha Sana
Upcoming	Aroiba Wayel		Binoranjan Oinam
Upcoming	Loinaidra Wari		Naocha Sana
Upcoming	Lonthokta Thamoi		Inaocha Khundrakpam
