= Leikhamton =

- Theatrical release poster
- Directed by: Tej Kshetri
- Screenplay by: Ksh. Subadani
- Story by: Ksh. Subadani
- Produced by: Th. Leishang
- Starring: Gokul Athokpam; Maya Choudhury; Sushmita Mangsatabam
- Cinematography: Geet Gulapee; Tomal; Aboi; Sanjit XL
- Edited by: Balli
- Music by: Poirei Thokchom
- Production company: TV 10
- Distributed by: TV 10
- Release date: 6 October 2014
- Running time: 118 minutes
- Country: India
- Language: Meiteilon (Manipuri)

Leikhamton is a 2014 Manipuri film directed by Tej Kshetri and produced by Th. Leishang. It stars Maya Choudhury as the titular protagonist with Gokul Athokpam and Sushmita Mangsatabam in the lead roles. The story and screenplay of the film was written by Ksh. Subadani. Poirei Thokchom composed the soundtrack and Ksh. Subadani and Tej Kshetri wrote the lyrics.

Leikhamton was released at Bhagyachandra Open Air Theatre (BOAT), Imphal on 6 October 2014.

== About ==
The film is about a widow Leikham (Maya Choudhury) who bravely faces the hurdles of life by driving a van for her livelihood. The film depicts the consequences met after Leikham's son got married and also narrates how her husband died. Gokul Athokpam plays double role in the film.

== Cast ==
- Gokul Athokpam as Ibohal and Ningthem
- Maya Choudhury as Leikham
- Sushmita Mangsatabam as Dr. Ningthibee
- Nandakumar Nongmaithem
- Narmada Sougaijam as Leihao
- Irom Shyamkishore as Ningthibee's father
- Elangbam Indu as R.K. Ongbi Ibemhal
- Laishram Lalitabi as Tharikleima
- Hijam Shyamdhani as Rajkumar Sanajaoba
- Philem Puneshori
- Thokchom Joshep as Mera
- Jasmin Elangbam
- Pilot Naorem
- Ningthouja Jayvidya
- Tej Kshetri
- Ratan Lai

== Soundtrack ==
Poirei Thokchom composed the soundtrack for the film and Ksh. Subadani and Tej Kshetri wrote the lyrics. The songs are titled Thajasu Thokli Leirangsu Satli, Thamoigi Mihulse and Numidang Waigina Tanjani.

No.	Title	Lyrics	Music	Singer(s)	Length
1.	"Thajasu Thokli Leirangsu Satli"	Ksh. Subadani	Poirei Thokchom	Huidrom Nowboy & Pushparani Huidrom	04:49
2.	"Thamoigi Mihulse"	Tej Kshetri	Poirei Thokchom	Sushmita Mangshatabam	04:48
3.	"Numidang Waigina Tanjaani"	N/A	Poirei Thokchom	Iraileima & Others	06:22
Total length:					15:59
