= Gokul Athokpam =

Indian actor from Manipur

- Born: 6 May 1974 (age 52); Thangmeiband, Imphal, Manipur
- Occupation: Actor-Producer
- Spouse: Athokpam Ongbi Sonia

Gokul Athokpam is an Indian actor who appears in Manipuri films. In addition to films, he has also worked in theatres, and has acted in many Shumang Kumheis, including Lidicegee Gulap, Nangna Luhongdringei and Lambidudei. In 2001, he got the title of Dawn Actor. He has acted in many famous Manipuri films. Among them, Lucy Kamei, Tayai, Thabaton-1,2, Thouri, Imagee Ibungo, Lambidudei, Sakthibee Tampha, Western Sankirtan, Lamjasara, Tabunungda Akaiba Likli and Eidi Thamoi Pikhre may be mentioned.

He also produced the movie Tayai. At the beginning of his acting career in Manipuri films, he used to play antagonistic characters.

== Accolades ==
Gokul Athokpam was honoured with different titles at several film awards and festivals.

Award	Category	Film	Ref.
4th RJ Film Vision Special Award 2009-10	Best Actor	–	
5th RJ Film Vision Special Award 2010–11	Best Actor	–	
6th RJ Film Vision Special Award 2011–12	Best Actor	–	
7th Manipur State Film Festival 2010	Best Actor in a Supporting Role	Bomb Blast	
3rd Sahitya Seva Samiti MANIFA 2014	Best Actor in a Lead Role	Thajagee Maihing	
9th MANIFA 2020	Best Actor in a Leading Role	Inamma	

== Selected filmography ==
Year	Film	Role	Director
2003	Lucy Kamei	Maipak/Apao	Vir Bhadra Yumnam
2006	Mamoudo Hingchabido Manemdo	Govind	Diya Khwairakpam
2006	Ngamloi Eidee Kainaba	James	Amar Raj
2006	Paokhum Ama	Biren	Tayenjam Mema & Ibomcha
2007	Meitei Chanu	Tayai	Amar Raj
2008	Liklaai	Nongdamba	Pilu H. & Joy Soram
2008	Tayai	Yaima/Tayai	K. Bimol Sharma
2009	Eegi Machu	Ibochouba	Keiphah
2009	Atiyagee Meenok	Ningthem	Ksh. Kishorekumar
2009	Nobap	Thanou	Heisnam Tomba
2009	Nongoubee	Dr. Yaiphaba	K. Bimol Sharma & Oja Tomba
2009	Bomb Blast	Loya	Birendra Salam
2010	21st Century's Kunti	Sanajaoba	Joy Soram
2010	Lambidudei	Sakhen	K. Bimol Sharma
2010	Apha Hen	Aphahen	L. Prakash
2010	Chanu	Pibarel	Bimol Phibou
2010	Aabirkhan	Aabirkhan	Pilu H.
2010	Khongpham Ama Soibada	Meiraba	O. Sanou
2010	Mamado Leisabido Angaobido	Psychiatrist	Romi Meitei
2010	Oooh...! The Great - Thawangee Purnima	Thawan	L. Prakash
2010	Govindagee Sharik Makhol	Paikhomba	Homen D' Wai
2010	Kadarmapee	Yaima	L. Prakash
2011	Luhongbagi Ahing	Koireng	Bijgupta Laishram
2011	Yairipok Thambalnu Amaga	Ranjit	Romi Meitei
2011	Thawaigee Mani	Tompok	Bijgupta Laishram
2011	Khujingee Mami	Chaoren	Romi Meitei
2011	Ishwar Masu Angaobani	Leichil	L. Prakash
2011	Fried Fish, Chicken Soup and a Premiere Show	Himself	Mamta Murthy
2011	Thabalgee Mangal	Thabal	Bimol Phibou
2012	Taru Tarubi Maktabee	Paari	Tej Kshetri
2012	Lamjasara	Nganba	L. Prakash
2012	Pabunggi Cycle	Mani	Bimol Phibou
2012	Western Sankirtan	Khomba	L. Prakash
2012	Tolenkhomba (Lakhpati)	Tolenkhomba	L. Rajesh
2013	Lumfoo Tomba	Tomba	Bimol Phibou
2013	Thajagee Maihing	Paari	Romi Meitei
2013	Tabunungda Akaiba Likli	Ningthem	Romi Meitei
2014	Eidee Kadaida	Thoungamba	O. Gautam
2014	Leikhamton	Ibohal and Ningthem	Tej Kshetri
2014	Thabaton 2	Thaba's second husband	Bijgupta Laishram
2014	Sanagi Tangbal	Thoungamba	Bijgupta Laishram
2014	Safu (Impact)	Nganba	K. Bimol Sharma
2015	Ikaibana Sire	Ngamba	L. Prakash
2015	Imoinu	Tondonba	Bijgupta Laishram
2015	Korounganba	Korou	Ojitbabu Ningthoujam
2016	Tharo Thambal	Thoiba	Bijgupta Laishram
2016	Ingagee Thanil	Chaoba	Mohindro (KAMS)
2016	Khongfam	Malem	Sudhir Kangjam
2016	Ningol Chakkouba	Tomthin	Sanaton Nongthomba
2016	Mashingkha	Chinglen	Jeetendra Ningomba
2017	Iche Tampha	Tampha's love interest	Bijgupta Laishram
2017	Itao Ibungo Nungsibee	Ibungo	Eepu
2017	Echan gi Laidhi	Thawan	Rakesh Moirangthem
2017	Chinglen Sana	Chinglen/Sana	Bijgupta Laishram
2017	Mani Mamou	Paari	Ajit Ningthouja
2017	Kaongamdraba Facebook	Paari	AK. Gyaneshori
2017	Mandalay Mathel	Malangba	Homeshwori
2017	Mitlu	Mangal	Gyaneshwor Konj
2017	Ningol Chakkouba 2	Tomthin	Sanaton Nongthomba
2017	Akhunba Takhellei	Thoiba	Ojitbabu Ningthoujam
2018	Maram Chanu	SDO Thanil	Bijgupta Laishram
2018	Pari Imom	Sanatombi's boyfriend	Bijgupta Laishram
2018	Chanu IPS	Khaba	Sanaton Nongthomba
2019	Yumleima	Leima's husband	Bijgupta Laishram
2019	Kao Phaaba	Leina's husband	Ishomani
2019	Khurai Angaobi	Ningthem	Sudhir Kangjam
2019	Nongbalgee Jacket	Pamel	Bimol Phibou
2019	Korounganba 3	Korou	Ojitbabu Ningthoujam
2019	Da Nongdamba	Nongdamba	Nasha
2019	Inamma	Chingkheinganba	Homeshwori
2019	Chanu IPS 2	Khaba	Sanaton Nongthomba
2019	Mutlamdai Thaomei	Chaoren	Sudhir Kangjam
2019	Eerei	Athouba	Krishnakumar Gurumayum
2021	Ima Machet Icha Tangkhai	Leibakchao	Homeshwori
2021	Iyaithakki Thambal	Korou	Bijgupta Laishram
2022	Shamjabee	Shamu	Premkumar Paonam
2022	Asira Punshi	Sanahal	Bijgupta Laishram
2022	Ningol	Sanathoi	L. Surjakanta
2022	Imoinu 2	Tondonba	Bijgupta Laishram
2022	Lairembi	Nongyai	Sudhir Kangjam
2022	Samadon	Pepe's love interest	Inaocha Khundrakpam
2024	Thambal Leikhok	Wanglen	Khoibam Homeshwori
2025	Nung Onkhraba Thamoi	Thoibi's husband	Surjit Khuman
2025	Eibu Hingkhisira	Mangal	Borajao Ningthoujam
Upcoming	Ahingsina Loidringei		O. Gautam
Upcoming	Kaidongpham		Geet Yumnam
