= Imoinu (film) =

- Theatrical release poster
- Directed by: Bijgupta Laishram
- Screenplay by: Bijgupta Laishram
- Story by: Bijgupta Laishram
- Produced by: Tarunkumar Heisnam
- Starring: Gokul Athokpam; Denny Likmabam; Thingom Pritam; Sonia Samjetsabam; Sonia Hijam; Premeshori; Maya Choudhury
- Cinematography: Surjitkanta N.
- Edited by: Surjitkanta N.
- Music by: Ranbir Thouna
- Production company: Heisnam Brothers Films
- Distributed by: Heisnam Brothers Films
- Release date: 30 October 2015
- Running time: 140 minutes
- Country: India
- Language: Meiteilon (Manipuri)

Imoinu is a 2015 Manipuri film directed by Bijgupta Laishram and produced by Tarunkumar Heisnam, under the banner of Heisnam Brothers Films and presented by Shrabankumar. The film features Gokul Athokpam, Sonia Samjetsabam and Sonia Hijam in the lead roles. Imoinu was released at Bhagyachandra Open Air Theatre (BOAT), Imphal, on 30 October 2015. The film was also screened at different theatres of Manipur, including Pratap Talkies, Imphal in January 2016, and it was well received by the audiences.

A sequel to the film Imoinu 2 was released on 20 October 2022.

== Plot ==
Temba has three sons, Achouba, Yaima and Tondonba. Achouba is a noted nat-sankirtan singer. His wife Leimarembi is a dutiful wife, whose manners and discipline impress his father-in-law Temba. Yaima is an engineer and his wife Phajabi is a complete contrast of Leimarembi. Temba's youngest son Tondonba is a bachelor who is searching for jobs, and is in relationship with Thaballei. Thaballei doesn't consider their relationship seriously and develops relations with Nongdamba. Bembem, who has just passed matriculation, is not happy with her sister Thaballei's treatment to Tondonba. Tondonba, on the other hand, begins to fall in love with Bembem for her simple nature. Bembem also starts loving Tondonba. At this time, Thaballei learned that Nongdamba is already married. So, she tries to get close to Tondonba, but when she only realised that Tondonba and Bembem are already in love with each other, she tries her best to reach their destiny.

== Cast ==
- Gokul Athokpam as Tondonba
- Denny Likmabam as Achouba
- Thingom Pritam as Yaima
- Sonia Samjetsabam as Bembem
- Sonia Hijam as Thaballei
- Premeshori as Phajabi
- Maya Choudhury as Leimarembi
- Takhellambam Lokendra as Ibohal
- R.K. Sanajaoba as Temba
- Sagolsem Dhanamanjuri as Thaballei's Mother
- Philem Puneshori as Bembem's Mother
- Moirangthem Sunil Myboy as Nongdamba

== Accolades ==
Award	Category	Winner's name	Result
5th SSS MANIFA 2016	Best Make-Up	Poison	Won
5th SSS MANIFA 2016	Best Actor in a Supporting Role - Male	R. K. Sanajaoba	Nominated
5th SSS MANIFA 2016	Best Actor in a Supporting Role - Female	Sonia Samjetsabam	Nominated
5th SSS MANIFA 2016	Best Costume Designer	Galif Pa	Nominated
10th Manipur State Film Awards 2016	Best Costume Design	Galif Pa	Won

== Soundtrack ==
Ranbir Thouna and Sorri Senjam composed the soundtrack for the film and Bijgupta Laishram wrote the lyrics. The songs are titled Kuphet Kaphet Nganba Tandangi and Leisha Mapung Phadringei.

Imoinu

Soundtrack album by Sorri Senjam Chitra Pangambam Pushparani Huidrom
- Genre: Feature film soundtrack
- Length: 11:13
- Label: Heisnam Brothers Films

No.	Title	Lyrics	Music	Singer(s)	Length
1.	"Kuphet Kaphet Nganba Tandangi"	Bijgupta Laishram	Sorri Senjam	Sorri Senjam, Chitra Pangambam	06:10
2.	"Leisha Mapung Phadringei"	Bijgupta Laishram	Ranbir Thouna	Pushparani Huidrom	05:03
Total length:					11:13
