= Eidee Kadaida =

- Theatrical release poster
- Directed by: Oinam Gautam Singh
- Written by: Sudhir Naoroibam
- Screenplay by: Sudhir Naoroibam
- Story by: Bigyani Hidangmayum
- Produced by: Bigyani Hidangmayum
- Starring: Gokul Athokpam; Abenao Elangbam; Leishangthem Tonthoi
- Cinematography: Mohon Kangla
- Edited by: Oinam Gautam Singh
- Music by: Jeetenkumar Naorem
- Production company: Nilahari Films
- Distributed by: Nilahari Films
- Release date: 31 January 2014
- Running time: 121 minutes
- Country: India
- Language: Meiteilon (Manipuri)

Eidee Kadaida (English: Where Am I) is a 2014 Manipuri film directed by O. Gautam and produced by Bigyani Hidangmayum, under the banner of Nilahari Films. The film features Gokul Athokpam, Abenao Elangbam and Leishangthem Tonthoi in the lead roles. The movie was premiered at Manipur Film Development Corporation (MFDC), Palace Compound on 31 January 2014 and Bhagyachandra Open Air Theatre (BOAT), Imphal on 19 April 2014.

== Plot ==
Life has many shades to offer. People in general live with the hope of finding the brighter shades of life. But when Lakhi's hope is constantly threatened by ill-fated events, she struggles to find her place in the society.

== Cast ==
- Gokul Athokpam as Thoungamba
- Abenao Elangbam as Lakhi
- Leishangthem Tonthoi as Rohini, Lakhi's mother
- Elangbam Indu as Rohini's mother
- Venus as Tonjaoba, Lakhi's younger brother
- Idhou as Brajagopal, Lakhi's paternal uncle
- Thasana Th. as Lakhi's friend
- Surjit Saikhom as Rohini's husband
- Rainy as Lakhi (Child)
- Ranbir Hidangmayum as Achouba, Lakhi's brother
- Pakhangba

== Accolades ==
Rainy won the Best Child Artist award at the 9th Manipur State Film Awards 2014. The film also won two awards at the 3rd SSS MANIFA 2014.

Award	Category	Winner's name	Result
9th Manipur State Film Awards 2014	Best Child Artist	Baby Rainy	Won
3rd SSS MANIFA 2014	Best Child Artist	Master Ranbir Hidangmayum	Won
3rd SSS MANIFA 2014	Best Make-Up	Bicha	Won

== Soundtrack ==
Jeetenkumar Naorem composed the soundtrack for the film and Bachan Chongtham and Amujao Chongtham wrote the lyrics. The songs are titled Nangbu Yengjaraga Eigi Thamoise, Leikrak Chatla Kangla Leimaida and Kainare Haiba Khanglabasu.

Eidee Kadaida

Soundtrack album by Suren Yumnam, Pushparani Huidrom, Nandini, Amujao
- Genre: Feature film soundtrack
- Length: 11:00
- Label: Nilahari Films

No.	Title	Music	Singer(s)	Length
1.	"Nangbu Yengjaraga Eigi Thamoise"	Jeetenkumar Naorem	Amujao Chongtham, Pushparani Huidrom	04:48
2.	"Leikrak Chatla Kangla Leimaida"	Jeetenkumar Naorem	Nandini	00:58
3.	"Kainare Haiba Khanglabasu"	Jeetenkumar Naorem	Suren Yumnam	05:14
Total length:				11:00

== See also ==
- Mangalsana
