= Abenao Elangbam =

Indian actress from Manipur

- Born: Sonia Elangbam; September 28, 1986; Top Khongnang Makhong, Porompat DC Road, Imphal, Manipur; Present address: Singjamei, Imphal, Manipur
- Occupation: Actress

Abenao Elangbam (born 28 September 1986) is an Indian actress working in Manipuri cinema.

== Early life and education ==
She completed her Master in Adult Education from Manipur University.

== Career ==
Before coming into films, she has acted in some theatrical plays under People's Arts and Dramatic Association, Imphal. Her first film is Chingjaogum Lepliba Thamoi, where she is playing a supporting role. She is most popularly known for her role of Naobi in Thoiba Thoibi. Among her popular films were Thoiba Thoibi, Akhunba Mani, Thokkidagi Kishi, Nobap, Ekhenglaktagi Red Rose, Chumthang Makhong, Bema Bema, Liklaai, Leikang Thambal, Tabunungda Akaiba Likli, Western Sankirtan, Phijigee Mani and Waikhu. In Phijigee Mani, she played an archer.

After her marriage, she continues to act in movies. Some of her films released post-marriage include Korounganba 3, Ima Machet Icha Tangkhai and Khomlang Laman.

== Accolades ==
Elangbam was honoured with Th. Ashokumar Memorial Award in Arts and Culture at the 10th Foundation Day of USU, Khurai.

Award	Category	Film	Ref.
7th Manipur State Film Festival 2010	Special Jury Award	Nobap	
2nd Sahitya Seva Samiti MANIFA 2013	Best Actress in a Leading Role	Pabunggi Cycle	
3rd SSS MANIFA 2014	Best Actress in a Leading Role	Tabunungda Akaiba Likli	
11th MANIFA 2023	Best Actor in a Supporting Role - Female	Nangbu Ngairambane	

== Selected filmography ==
Year	Film	Role	Director
2004	Chingjaogum Lepliba Thamoi	Sonia	Diya Khwairakpam
2006	Cheinakhol	Supporting role	Ch. Inaobi
2007	Thoiba Thoibi	Naobi	Romi Meitei
2007	Akhunba Mani	Thoi	Romi Meitei
2007	Manithoiba	Thoibi	Romi Meitei
2008	Lanmei Thanbi	Takhellei	Chou En Lai & O. Mangi
2008	Chumthang Makhong	Priyo's sister	Romi Meitei
2008	Ekhenglaktagi Red Rose	Thoibi	Romi Meitei
2008	Liklaai	Abenao	Pilu H. & Joy Soram
2009	Thokkidagi Kishi	Manjuri	Diya Khwairakpam
2009	Leikang Thambal	Ranjana	Tej Kshetri
2009	Atiyagee Meenok	Thoibi	Ksh. Kishorekumar
2009	Nonglei	Langlen	O. Jiten
2009	Nongoubee	Ningtharla	K. Bimol Sharma & Oja Tomba
2009	Meisa	Tampha	Paojel
2009	Nobap	Thaja	Heisnam Tomba
2009	Dharmagi Mingda Imagidamak	Thoibi	Romi Meitei
2010	Nangdi Eigi Thawaini	Tampha	O. Gautam
2010	Thoudang	Thoibi	Romi Meitei
2010	Langdai	Nongleima	Ranjitkumar Meitei
2010	Chanu	Linthoi	Bimol Phibou
2010	Torban Amagi Wari	Lanchenbi	Niladhwaja Khuman
2011	Phijigee Mani	Bicha	O. Gautam
2011	Punshi Chuppa Nangshe Eigini	Thaja	Premanda
2011	Nongmadi Soidana	Nungsibi	Ishomani
2011	Ishwar Masu Angaobani	Likla	L. Prakash
2011	Yairipok Thambalnu Amaga	Thoibi	Romi Meitei
2011	Thabalgee Mangal	Memthoi	Bimol Phibou
2012	Taru Tarubi Maktabee	Tarubi	Tej Kshetri
2012	Pabunggi Cycle	Thoibi	Bimol Phibou
2012	Boiton Mangkhre	Memcha	Khoibam Homeshwori
2012	Western Sankirtan	Ayeengbi	L. Prakash
2012	Yaiphare Yaiphare	Ningolei	Bimol Phibou
2013	Tabunungda Akaiba Likli	Thoibi	Romi Meitei
2013	80,000 Meiraba Romio	Yaiphabi	Premanda
2013	Sangbrei Managi Chenghi Manam	Thoibi	Romi Meitei
2013	Leihouroko	Linthoi	Amar Raj
2014	Eidee Kadaida	Lakhi	O. Gautam
2014	Waikhu	Leihao	Khoibam Homeshwori
2014	Sathiba Danger	Thoibi	Ajit Ningthouja
2014	Sayon Ahum	Rebika	Kh. Jackson
2014	VDF Thasana	Thadoi	Homen D' Wai
2014	Safu (Impact)	Thoibi	K. Bimol Sharma
2014	Nongmatang	Tampha	Suvas E.
2015	Hingbagee Mahao	Linthoi	Jeetendra Ningomba
2016	Mashingkha	Mellei	Jeetendra Ningomba
2016	Thammoi Ahum	Thaja	Aten
2016	Ingagee Thanil	Leibaklei	Mohindro (KAMS)
2017	Korounganba 2	Thoi	Ojitbabu Ningthoujam
2017	Jiri Leima Imphal Thoibi	Thoibi	Paojel
2017	Ningtha	Thokchom Thoibi	Homen D' Wai
2018	Hingkhini Emadi	Abe	Rabi Salam
2018	Meitan Araba	Teacher	Lukanand Kshetrimayum
2019	Tangna Phangjaba Lan		Fifi Mangang
2019	Korounganba 3	Thoi	Ojitbabu Ningthoujam
2020	Bangladeshki Sana Tampha		OC Meira
2021	Ima Machet Icha Tangkhai	Thambal	Khoibam Homeshwori
2022	Hoo Sangom	Leishembi	Ojitbabu Ningthoujam
2022	Nangbu Ngairambane	Ehanbi	Rajen Leishangthem
2024	Khomlang Laman	Tampha	OC Meira
2024	Thambal Leikhok	Sangbannabi	Khoibam Homeshwori
Upcoming	Akhunba Thawai		AD Chingakham
Upcoming	Fajabi Hoo		Thoiba Soibam
