= Lammei =

2002 Manipuri film

- Theatrical release poster
- Directed by: Oken Amakcham; Chief assistant: O. Gautam; Assisted by: Y. Premjit
- Screenplay by: Ch. Inaobi
- Story by: M.C. Sunder
- Produced by: Premjit Naoroibam; Anita Naoroibam
- Starring: Denny Likmabam; Premeshori
- Cinematography: Imo Yumnam
- Edited by: Imo Yumnam; Songs: Ishomani
- Music by: Oken Amakcham; Music Arranger: O. Geet, Tomba & Kanta; Background Score: Jiten & Tiken
- Production companies: Kangla Films, Manipur
- Distributed by: Kangla Films, Manipur
- Release dates: 5 May 2002 (Formal release); 22 May 2002 (Theatrical release)
- Running time: 130 minutes
- Country: India
- Language: Meiteilon (Manipuri)

Lammei (English: Wildfire) is a 2002 Manipuri film directed by Oken Amakcham and produced by Premjit Naoroibam and Anita Naoroibam, under the banner of Kangla Films. Denny Likmabam and Premeshori played lead roles in the movie. The movie was made after conducting the Winter Film Workshop by Kangla Films at Hotel Excellency, Imphal. It was released formally by the titular king of Manipur, Leishemba Sanajaoba, on 5 May 2002 and started its regular theatrical run at Friends Talkies, Paona Bazar on 22 May 2002. It is the first Manipuri video film to have a commercial screening at a theatre. Lammei also marked the beginning of a digital era in Manipuri cinema.

== Synopsis ==
The film is about love and revenge and shows that truth always wins in the end. Thambal, a young lady is brutally raped by a Minister's son Rocky. But the charges for the heinous crime falls upon Chinglen, Thambal's boyfriend. Rocky's father uses various powerful means to confine Chinglen inside a jail. But Chinglen's urge for revenge spreads like a wildlife. He espaces from the police and skilfully takes lives of all those involved in Thambal's murder one after another. Justice is finally served.

== Cast ==
- Denny Likmabam as Chinglen
- Premeshori as Thambal
- Iboyaima Khuman as Thambal's father
- Laishram Lalitabi as Chinglen's mother
- Rocky as Rocky
- Gurumayum Kalpana as Leishna, Chinglen's lawyer
- Prameshwor Oinam as Rocky's lawyer
- Baby Mutum Yaiphabi as Baby Thambal
- Akash
- Usha
- Bidyapati
- Tombi
- Jiten

== Soundtrack ==
Oken Amakcham and Lalambung Imo composed the soundtrack for the film and W. Rajen, Rajendra Okram, Ashajit Angomcha and Manoraja Thokchom wrote the lyrics. The songs are titled Wakhal Ethak Houre, Manglan Khuding, Mitchiduna Eibu Ngaohalle, Lammei Lammei and Kijeine Eidi.

Lammei

Soundtrack album by Dinesh Sharma, Romesh, Sophia Salam, Pushparani Huidrom
- Released: 2002
- Genre: Feature film soundtrack
- Length: 25:13
- Label: Kangla Films
External audio
- Audio Jukebox on YouTube

No.	Title	Lyrics	Music	Singer(s)	Length
1.	"Wakhal Ethak Houre"	Ashajit Angomcha	Oken Amakcham	Sophia Salam	04:53
2.	"Manglan Khuding"	Ashajit Angomcha	Oken Amakcham	Dinesh Sharma	05:25
3.	"Mitchiduna Eibu Ngaohalle"	Manoraja Thokchom	Lalambung Imo	Romesh	04:35
4.	"Lammei Lammei"	W. Rajen Singh	Oken Amakcham	Dinesh Sharma	04:45
5.	"Kijeine Eidi"	Rajendra Okram	Oken Amakcham	Pushparani Huidrom	05:35
Total length:					25:13
