= Maya Choudhury =

Indian actress from Manipur

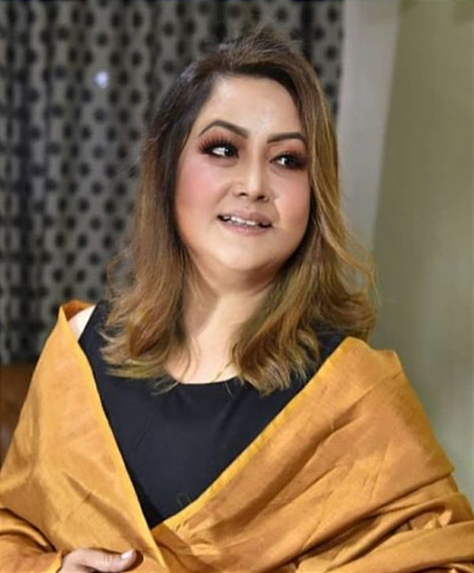
- Maya Choudhury in 2020
- Born: Imphal, Manipur; Present address: Palace Compound, Imphal, Manipur
- Occupation: Actress
- Years active: 1997-present
- Spouse: Laishram Manikanta
- Parent(s): Ch. Somorjit Sharma; Ch. Ongbi Sanahanbi Devi

Maya Choudhury is an Indian actress who appears in Manipuri films. For her performance as Anna Martin in the 2024 film Oneness, she received the Best Supporting Actor (Female) award at the 17th Manipur State Film Awards in 2025, marking the first award of her career.

Some of her notable films are Basantagee Nongallamdai trilogy, Oneness, Meichak, Kunti, Mr. Lakhipyari, Liklaai, Tomthin Shija, Imoinu and Saklon Amada.

== Career ==
In 1998, Maya Choudhury made her acting debut in the celluloid film Meichak, directed by Laimayum Banka Sharma. Later that year, she participated in Miss Manipur 1998, where she was placed 2nd runner-up, winning 5 other subtitles. It was then followed by two other celluloid films before she got married.

She made her comeback to acting after marriage with films like Basantagee Nongallamdai and 21st Century's Kunti, for which she credited her husband and family for their support.

Maya's comeback in the industry is marked by Leikhamton and supporting roles in films like Imoinu, Tomthin Shija, Hiyai, and Pandam Amada, while the latter was selected for the 18th Dhaka International Film Festival 2019, the 18th Third Eye Asian Film Festival 2019, Mumbai and the Tokyo Lift-Off Film Festival 2020.

=== Notable Critical Response ===
In 2024, Maya Choudhury appeared as a protagonist playing the role of Anna Martin in the film Oneness, directed by Priyakanta Laishram, which is the first Manipuri film to explore same-sex relationships. The film made its world premiere at South Asia's biggest queer film festival, KASHISH Pride Film Festival 2024, Mumbai and later got official selections and screened at the 14th Bangalore Queer Film Festival 2024, the 2nd Eikhoigi Imphal International Film Festival 2025, and the 2nd North East India Film Festival, Manipur. The film also got recommendations from Elle Magazine and Mid-Day.

Upon release, Maya got critical acclaim for her performance as Anna Martin. The Sangai Express praised her performance, writing that she "delivers one of her most powerful performances in ONENESS." Manipur Wiki penned, "Maya Choudhury shines as another stand out star of the film, delivering outstanding performances throughout." and stating that, "This performance is arguably the best of her career." E-Pao praised her performance, writing, "Maya's portrayal is both subtle and impactful, capturing the essence of a mother's love and resilience." Imphal Review of Arts and Politics described it as “perhaps the finest performance of her illustrious career”, praising her emotionally nuanced portrayal of a conflicted mother, considering her role as one of the strongest elements of the film, contributing significantly to its impact. Signpost News highlighted Maya Choudhury’s role as a key emotional anchor in Oneness, noting her “transformative arc” as one of the film’s most impactful elements.

She received her first pan-Northeast India nomination for Best Actress - Northeast at the Prag Cine Awards 2025 for her performance in the film. Her performance as Anna Martin in Oneness was recognized by Screen Echoes Manipur as one of the Best 8 Performances in Manipuri Cinema in the Last Decade.

At the 17th Manipur State Film Awards in 2025, she received the Best Supporting Actor (Female) award for Oneness. Presented by the Government of Manipur and the Manipur State Film Development Society, the award marked the first recognition in her 28-year-long acting career.

== Accolades ==
Award	Category	Film	Result	Ref.
17th Manipur State Film Awards 2025	Best Supporting Actor (Female)	Oneness	Won	
Prag Cine Awards 2025	Best Actress - Northeast	Oneness	Nominated	
1st SSS MANIFA 2012	Best Actress	Saklon Amada	Nominated	

== Controversy ==
In 2024, Maya Choudhury became the subject of online criticism and trolling following a promotional interview for the film Oneness. During the interview, she remarked she does not watch films in which she does not star, a statement that was misinterpreted and contributed to heightened backlash against the film. The controversy occurred amidst broader resistance to the film’s subject matter in Manipur.

== Selected filmography ==
Year	Film	Role	Director
1998	Meichak	Lata	L. Banka Sharma
1999	Aroiba Bidaai	Thadoi	Oken Amakcham
2004	Thajabagee Wangmada	Sarju	Oken Amakcham
2004	Panthungeedara Nungshiba	Asha	Diya Khwairakpam
2005	Nangtana Helli	Monika	Oken Amakcham
2005	Mr. Lakhipyari	Radha	Homen D' Wai
2006	Eigi Salini Ma'am	Salini Thapa	Vir Bhadra Yumnam
2006	Basantagee Nongallamdai	Sarla	Tej Kshetri
2007	Ujaningba Shaktam	Sarla	Tej Kshetri
2008	Chatlabra Waarouna?	Thaja	Khwairakpam Bishwamittra
2008	Liklaai	Liklaai	Pilu H.
2008	Ningthem	Panthoi	Khwairakpam Bishwamittra
2008	Lanmei Thanbi	Dr. Memi	Chou En Lai & O. Mangi
2009	Lonthoktabagee Wari	Leihao	Diya Khwairakpam
2009	Leikang Thambal	Thambal	Tej Kshetri
2009	Utaangbi	Radha	Romi Meitei
2010	Imphal Ningol	Leibaklei	Bijgupta Laishram
2010	Piranglakta Manglan Ama	Dr. Chongnu	Khangembam Kuleswar
2010	Lambidudei	Dr. Linthoi	K. Bimal Sharma
2010	Kanadano	Lingjel's sister	I.S. Gurung
2010	Saklon Amada	Memthoi	L. Surjakanta
2010	Meiree Natte Liklani	Lanjenbi	Amar Raj
2010	Ahing Mamei	Leima	Bimol Phibou
2010	Oooh...! The Great - Thawangee Purnima	Purnima	L. Prakash
2010	21st Century's Kunti	Rajlakshmi	Joy Soram
2010	Nungshibee Takhellei	Linthoi	Amar Raj
2010	Torban Amagi Wari	Phajabi	Niladhwaja Khuman
2011	Mellei Leishna Thariktha	Leishna	Amar Raj
2011	Momon Meenok	Thariktha	Ksh. Kishorekumar
2011	Fried Fish, Chicken Soup and a Premiere Show	Herself	Mamta Murthy
2014	Leikhamton	Leikham	Tej Kshetri
2015	Imoinu	Leimarembi	Bijgputa Laishram
2015	Shajik Thaba	Sanarembi's mother	Ojitbabu Ningthoujam
2017	Tomthin Shija	Dr. Ayingbi Shija	Bobby Haobam
2018	Hiyai	Leima	Herojit Naoroibam
2019	Pandam Amada	Yaiphabi	O. Gautam
2020	Aronba Wari	Yaiphabi's mother	OC Meira
2022	Imoinu 2	Leimarembi	Bijgupta Laishram
2022	Laija Lembi	Tampha	Sudhir Kangjam
2024	Oneness	Anna Martin	Priyakanta Laishram
2024	Khomlang Laman	Chinglen's mother	OC Meira
Upcoming	Laija Lembi 2	Tampha	Sudhir Kangjam
