= Iboyaima Khuman =

Indian actor and director from Manipur

- Born: Ibungo Yaima; 1 March 1953 (age 73); Manipur, India
- Occupations: Actor, Director
- Parent: Laishram Iboton (father)

Iboyaima Khuman (born 1 March 1953) is a prominent Shumang Kumhei (Courtyard theatre) artist born in Manipur, India. He has been conferred best actor, best director awards in his long journey in Shumang Kumhei, a unique traditional Manipuri Art form not found in any parts of the globe.

== Early life ==
Iboyaima Khuman grew up as a timid and reserved boy since childhood. He did his primary education at Uchekon Takhok Mapal High School and Wangkhei Boys' School and passed Matriculation from Meetei Mayek High School, Kongba.

== Awards ==
- Best Actor Award in the year 1985 in a Shumang Kumhei Imphal Hotel.

== Selected Shumang Kumheis ==
- Imphal Hotel
- 21st Century gee Kunti-1,2,3,4,5,6
- Gusmo gee Khudol: East Timor
- Restaphen
- Kangleipakta 1703
- Naitom Satpi
- Eyaithakki Thambal (2009)
- Nongallamdaishida
- Yenningthana Ngairi
- Aruba Echel
- Amamba Lambee
- Melody
- Neirehe
- Wakchinggi Nongallamdai
- Huranba Ashingba Natte
- Wahang Ama
- Pabung Hotel gee Tamo
- Sanadagi Kei
- Malemdi Kaihoudre Imungdi Kaire
- Cheikhei Wangma
- Ngaijarakpa Numit
- Lallibasi Kanano
- Thamoigee Makhol (2020)
- Mei Iklaba Thamoi (2021)
- Laklaroi Amuk Yeningtha (2022)
- Aronba Wari (2023)
- Ningol Mawa (2025)

== Selected filmography ==
| Year | Film | Director |
|---|---|---|
| 2000 | Echelsida | Oken Amakcham |
| 2002 | Lammei | Oken Amakcham |
| 2004 | Dr. Yaima | Homen D' Wai |
| 2008 | Keishamthong Thoibi | O. Gautam |
| 2009 | Manglanda Lak U Ko | Warjeet Moirangthem |
| 2012 | Highway 39: Punshi Lambida | Homen D' Wai |
| 2014 | 23rd Century: Ngasigee Matungda | Dinesh Tongbram |
