= Kamala Saikhom =

Indian actress

- Born: Kamala Saikhom; Uripok, Imphal, Manipur, India
- Occupations: Actress, Producer
- Years active: 2002-2012

Kamala Saikhom is an Indian actress who predominantly appeared in Manipuri films. She was a resident of Uripok, Imphal, Manipur. Besides acting in films, she had also produced two movies Nangsu Mouni and Kadarmapee. She had acted in more than 120 Manipuri films. She married an Army officer, Avinash from Agra, Uttar Pradesh in 2012.

== Career ==
She started acting in music video albums and then to films. Her debut Manipuri feature film as a leading lady was Saya in 2003. Among her famous films, Sakthibee Tampha, Natephamda Tero, Ayukki Likla, Khuji, Aabirkhan, Ta-Tomba the Great, Khujingee Mami, Kangla Karabar and Minambagi Phajaba may be mentioned.

In Sakthibee Tampha and Africa Leishabi, she played the roles of dark skinned ladies, Tampha and Bina respectively. Her role of Tampha in Sakthibee Tampha was well received by audiences. Saikhom played a tongue stammered woman in the movie Natephamda Tero. In the movie Ashit Awanthada Pee Thadoi Ahum, she played the role of a poet. She played Bengali and Bihari ladies in Leeklam and Kangla Karabar respectively.

Minambagi Phajaba, released on 9 August 2012, is her last film released till date, even though shooting of the film completed some years before the release. Her last film shootings were of Africa Leishabi and Khujingee Mami.

== Selected filmography ==
Year	Film	Role	Director
2004	Nungshi Hekta Hairage	Kamala	Ksh. Kishorekumar
2005	Ta-Tomba the Great	Thoibi	Ksh. Kishorekumar
2005	Mathang Mapokta	Linthoi	Diya Khwairakpam
2006	Sageigee Mouni	Thambal	Diya Khwairakpam
2006	Hero	Fajabi	Diya Khwairakpam
2006	Eishu Thammoi Palli	Medha	Ksh. Kishorekumar
2006	Amuktang Chamthoknashi	Sheela	Diya Khwairakpam
2006	Sakthibee Tampha	Tampha	Diya Khwairakpam
2006	Khuji	Rani	Romi Meitei
2006	Mittrang Keithel	Tamphasana	Homen D' Wai
2006	Best Friend	Thaba	O. Sanou
2006	Eshworgee Khudol	Linthoi	Diya Khwairakpam
2006	Thamoina Kari Hairi	Laika	Diya Khwairakpam
2007	Meitei Chanu	Chanu	Amar Raj
2007	Nangna Thawaini	Tampha	Chan Heisnam
2007	Marupki Marup	Shanti	Khwairakpam Bishwamittra
2007	Akhunba Mani	Takhellei	Romi Meitei
2008	Malla Malla Leinungshi	Usha	Amar Raj
2008	Kangla Karabar	Dasini	Pilu H.
2008	Kekoo Lotpee	Lawyer	Homen D' Wai
2008	Handakta Nouna Khangnaba	Nganthoi	P. Praphullo
2009	Khangdreda Nongdamba	Thoibi	Romi Meitei
2009	Leeklam	Deepika Mukherjee	Homen D' Wai
2009	Atiyagee Meenok	Phajabi	Ksh. Kishorekumar
2009	Oja Sandhya	Sandhya	Oken Amakcham
2009	Khongthang-gi Makhol	Bijaya	O. Gautam
2010	Ashit Awanthada Pee Thadoi Ahum	Thoibi	Romi Meitei
2010	Aabirkhan	Amina	Pilu H.
2010	Imagi Laman Singamdre	Thoibi	Romi Meitei
2010	Kadarmapee	Tamphasana	L. Prakash
2010	Mamado Leisabido Angaobido	Sushila Saikhom	Romi Meitei
2011	Leima	Leima	Ojitkumar Elangbam
2011	Thawaigee Mani	Purnima	Bijgupta Laishram
2011	Thadoi	Thadoi	Chan Heisnam
2011	Loibataare Ta Raju	Kamala	Pilu H.
2011	Khujingee Mami	Thoibi	Romi Meitei
2012	Africa Leishabi	Bina	Pilu H.
2012	Cheitheng	Tamna	Chan Heisnam
2012	Minambagi Phajaba	Linthoi	Eepu
