= Melody Queen =

Melody Queen may refer to:

- Anuradha Paudwal (born 1954), Indian bhajan/devotional singer and playback singer in Hindi cinema
- Lata Mangeshkar (1929–2022), Indian playback singer, known as the "Queen of Melody"
- Pushparani Huidrom, Indian singer in Manipuri cinema, known as the "Melody Queen of Manipur"
- K. S. Chithra (born 1963), Indian Carnatic musician and singer, known as the "Melody Queen of South India"
- Sujatha Mohan (born 1963), Indian singer in South Indian cinema, known as the "Melody Queen of South India"
