= Luhongbagi Ahing =

- Poster
- Directed by: Bijgupta Laishram
- Screenplay by: Bijgupta Laishram
- Story by: Bijgupta Laishram
- Produced by: T. Baruni Devi
- Starring: Gokul Athokpam; Bala Hijam; Ashok Seleibam
- Cinematography: Radhamohon
- Edited by: K. Bimol Sharma
- Music by: Gopi (KOG); Background Score: Pee
- Production company: Baruni Films
- Distributed by: Baruni Films
- Release date: 3 June 2011
- Running time: 150 minutes
- Country: India
- Language: Meiteilon (Manipuri)

Lugongbagi Ahing (English: Marriage Night) is a 2011 Manipuri film directed by Bijgupta Laishram and produced by T. Baruni Devi, under the banner of Baruni Films. The film features Gokul Athokpam, Bala Hijam and Ashok Seleibam in the lead roles. The film was released at Classic Hotel, Imphal on 3 June 2011. It is a 2011 blockbuster film.

== Cast ==
- Gokul Athokpam as Koireng
- Bala Hijam as Purnima
- Ashok Seleibam as Chinglemba
- Sonia Hijam as Langlen, Koireng's sister
- Ghanashyam
- Wangkhem Lalitkumar
- Narendra Ningomba as Koireng's brother
- SP Ingocha Yanglem
- Laishram Lalitabi as Koireng's mother
- Heisnam Geeta as Purnima's mother
- Philem Puneshori as Koireng's sister-in-law

== Soundtrack ==
Gopi (KOG) composed the soundtrack for the movie. Ghanashyam and Bijgupta Laishram wrote the lyrics.

Luhongbagi Ahing

Soundtrack album by Mandakini Takhellambam, Huidrom Nowboy, Pushparani Huidrom
- Released: 2011
- Genre: Feature film soundtrack
- Length: 13:39
- Label: Baruni Films
- Producer: T. Baruni Devi

No.	Title	Music	Singer(s)	Length
1.	"Yamna Ngak E Nangse"	Gopi (KOG)	Mandakini Takhellambam, Huidrom Nowboy	05:03
2.	"Punshi Punshi"	Gopi (KOG)	Pushparani Huidrom	03:48
3.	"Amambada Nongthangbu Kijaruba"	Gopi (KOG)	Huidrom Nowboy, Pushparani Huidrom	04:50
Total length:				13:39

== Accolades ==
The movie bagged two awards out of the five nominations at the 1st Sahitya Seva Samiti MANIFA held in 2012. Pushparani Huidrom and Gopi (KOG) won the awards.

Award	Category	Winner's name	Result
1st SSS MANIFA 2012	Best Female Playback Singer	Pushparani Huidrom	Won
1st SSS MANIFA 2012	Best Music Director	Gopi (KOG)	Won
1st SSS MANIFA 2012	Best Actor in a Leading Role - Male	Gokul Athokpam	Nominated
1st SSS MANIFA 2012	Best Actor in a Leading Role - Female	Bala Hijam	Nominated
1st SSS MANIFA 2012	Best Lyricist	Bijgupta Laishram	Nominated
