= Pandam Amada =

- Theatrical release poster
- Directed by: Oinam Gautam Singh
- Screenplay by: Santosh Laishram
- Story by: Santosh Laishram
- Produced by: Sarokons
- Starring: Bonney Takhelmayum; Archana Konsam
- Cinematography: Dhana Luwang
- Edited by: Oinam Gautam Singh
- Music by: Songs: Tony Aheibam; Score: Karnajit L.; RK Birendrajit
- Production company: Takhel Films
- Distributed by: Takhel Films
- Release date: 8 September 2019
- Running time: 99 minutes
- Country: India
- Language: Meiteilon (Manipuri)

Pandam Amada (English: In Pursuit Of) is a 2019 Manipuri film directed by O. Gautam and produced by Sarokons. It stars Bonney Takhelmayum and Archana Konsam in the lead roles. The film was premiered at MSFDS on 8 September 2019. It was world premiered at the 18th International Dhaka Film Festival held at Dhaka, Bangladesh from 11 to 19 January 2020. Pandam Amada was selected among 15 films screened in the Children's Film Section of the festival.

The film also got selections in the 18th Third Eye Asian Film Festival, Mumbai and Tokyo Lift-Off Film Festival, 2020. The movie was nominated for 9th MANIFA 2020 under various categories. It won many awards, including the Best Feature Film Award in the Manipur State Film Awards 2020.

== Cast ==
- Bonney Takhelmayum as Malem
- Archana Konsam as Bembem
- Raju Nong as Malem's father
- Maya Choudhury as Yaiphabi, Malem's mother
- Ningthoujam Rina as Tombi, Nganba's mother
- Naoton H. as Nganba
- Sanu Thokchom as Lemba
- Heikrujam Kerish
- Sandip Pukhram
- Sagar Maibam
- Ghanashyam Khangembam
- Sorokhaibam Saratchandra

== Soundtrack ==
Tony Aheibam composed the soundtrack for the film and Eikhoi Yambung wrote the lyrics. The songs are titled Naken Tha and Exam Loire.

Pandam Amada

Soundtrack album by Kenedy Khuman
- Genre: Feature film soundtrack
- Length: 9:41
- Label: Takhel Films
External audio
- Naken Tha on YouTube

No.	Title	Lyrics	Music	Singer(s)	Length
1.	"Naken Tha"	Eikhoi Yambung	Tony Aheibam	Kenedy Khuman	05:25
2.	"Exam Loire"	Eikhoi Yambung	Tony Aheibam	Kenedy Khuman	04:16
Total length:					9:41

== Accolades ==
Pandam Amada won many awards at the 13th Manipur State Film Awards 2020, including the Best Feature Film Award. At the 9th MANIFA 2020, the movie won four awards out of the 14 nominations. The award ceremonies for both were postponed and held in 2021 due to the COVID-19 pandemic.

Award	Date of ceremony	Category	Recipient(s)	Result	Ref.
13th Manipur State Film Awards 2020	9 April 2021	Best Feature Film	Producer: Konsam Saroja; Director: O. Gautam	Won	
13th Manipur State Film Awards 2020	9 April 2021	Best Director	Oinam Gautam Singh	Won	
13th Manipur State Film Awards 2020	9 April 2021	Best Screenplay (Original)	Santosh Laishram & Momocha Konthoujam	Won	
13th Manipur State Film Awards 2020	9 April 2021	Best Production Designer	Konjengbam Demba	Won	
13th Manipur State Film Awards 2020	9 April 2021	Best Audiography (Sound Designer)	Ph. Shananda Sharma	Won	
13th Manipur State Film Awards 2020	9 April 2021	Best Editing	Oinam Gautam Singh	Won	
13th Manipur State Film Awards 2020	9 April 2021	Best Make-Up	Poison (Kh. Debabrata)	Won	
13th Manipur State Film Awards 2020	9 April 2021	Best Background Score	R.K. Birendrajit & L. Karnajit	Won	
13th Manipur State Film Awards 2020	9 April 2021	Best Playback Singer (Male)	Kenedy Khuman (Naken Tha)	Won	
13th Manipur State Film Awards 2020	9 April 2021	Best Choreography	John Irom	Won	
13th Manipur State Film Awards 2020	9 April 2021	Best Children's Film	O. Gautam; Konsam Saroja	Won	
9th MANIFA 2020	8 February 2021	Best Audiography	P. Shananda Sharma	Won	
9th MANIFA 2020	8 February 2021	Best Background Score	R.K. Birendrajit & Karnajit Laishram	Won	
9th MANIFA 2020	8 February 2021	Best Art Director	Irom John Meitei	Won	
9th MANIFA 2020	8 February 2021	Best Cinematography	Dhana Luwang	Won	
9th MANIFA 2020	8 February 2021	Best Feature Film	Producer: Konsam Saroja; Director: O. Gautam	Nominated	
9th MANIFA 2020	8 February 2021	Best Director	Oinam Gautam Singh	Nominated	
9th MANIFA 2020	8 February 2021	Best Screenplay	Santosh Laishram	Nominated	
9th MANIFA 2020	8 February 2021	Best Actor in a Supporting Role - Male	Raju Nong	Nominated	
9th MANIFA 2020	8 February 2021	Best Lyricist	Eikhoi Yambung	Nominated	
9th MANIFA 2020	8 February 2021	Best Playback Singer - Male	Kenedy Khuman	Nominated	
9th MANIFA 2020	8 February 2021	Best Editing	Oinam Gautam Singh	Nominated	
9th MANIFA 2020	8 February 2021	Best Costume	Saroja Konsam	Nominated	
9th MANIFA 2020	8 February 2021	Best Story	Saroja Konsam	Nominated	
9th MANIFA 2020	8 February 2021	Best Choreography	John Irom	Nominated	
