= Ima Machet Icha Tangkhai =

- Theatrical release poster
- Directed by: Khoibam Homeshwori
- Written by: Ranjit Ningthouja
- Produced by: Chingsubam Khumanleima
- Starring: Gokul Athokpam; Gurumayum Bonny; Abenao Elangbam; Soma Laishram; Luwangthoibi Chanu
- Cinematography: Regan Kh.
- Edited by: Regan Kh.
- Music by: Nongmaithem Ibomcha; Nanao Sagolmang
- Production company: Luwang Films
- Distributed by: Luwang Films
- Release date: 7 November 2021
- Running time: 147 minutes
- Country: India
- Language: Meiteilon (Manipuri)

Ima Machet Icha Tangkhai (English: Partly Mother, Half Child) is a 2021 Manipuri film directed by Khoibam Homeshwori and produced by Chingsubam Khumanleima for Luwang Films. It stars Gokul Athokpam, Gurumayum Bonny, Abenao Elangbam, Soma Laishram and Luwangthoibi Chanu. The movie was released on 7 November 2021 at Manipur State Film Development Society in the Palace Compound, Imphal, with MP and titular king Leishemba Sanajaoba attending as the chief guest. It was also screened at the Sangai Film Festival 2022, which was organised as a part of the Manipur Sangai Festival.

== Cast ==
- Gokul Athokpam as Leibakchao
- Gurumayum Bonny as Sanahal
- Abenao Elangbam as Thambal
- Soma Laishram as Sakhenbi
- Luwangthoibi Chanu as Sajikhombi and Thabatombi (dual role)
- Idhou (Chakpram Rameshchandra) as Lukhoi
- Ningthoujam Jayvidya as Sakhenbi's father
- Takhellambam Lokendra as Sanahal's father
- Khoibam Homeshwori as Sanahal's mother
- Laishram Lalitabi as Ene
- Khoirom Sangeeta as Teacher
- Santajit

== Soundtrack ==
Nongmaithem Ibomcha and Nanao Sagolmang composed the soundtrack for the film. The lyrics were written by Biramangol Mekola and Rajmani Ayekpam. The two songs in the movie are "Nungshi Nungol Houna Tha" and "Ichadi Chaore".

Ima Machet Icha Tangkhai

Soundtrack album by Nongmaithem Ibomcha, Pushparani Huidrom, Gaganpriya Kabrambam
- Released: 25 June 2021
- Genre: Feature film soundtrack
- Length: 9:48
- Label: Luwang Films
- Producer: Chingsubam Khumanleima

No.	Title	Lyrics	Music	Singer(s)	Length
1.	"Nungshi Nungol Houna Tha"	Biramangol Mekola	Nongmaithem Ibomcha	Nongmaithem Ibomcha, Pushparani Huidrom	05:30
2.	"Ichadi Chaore"	Rajmani Ayekpam	Nanao Sagolmang	Pushparani Huidrom, Gaganpriya Kabrambam	04:18
Total length:					9:48

== Reception ==
Writing for The Sangai Express, Rajmani Ayekpam opined that "Ima Machet Icha Tangkhai, one of the few films after pandemic is worth mentioning because of both its aesthetic value and entertainment spices."

== Accolades ==
Award	Category	Winner's name	Result	Ref.
14th Manipur State Film Awards 2022	Best Child Artist	Luwangthoibi Chanu	Won	
10th MANIFA 2022	Best Supporting Actor - Female	Soma Laishram	Won	
10th MANIFA 2022	Best Choreography	Thiyam Menaka	Nominated	
10th MANIFA 2022	Best Lyricist	Biramangol Mekola for the song "Nungsi Nungol Houna Tha"	Nominated	
10th MANIFA 2022	Best Playback Singer - Male	Nongmaithem Ibomcha for the song "Nungsi Nungol Houna Tha"	Nominated	
10th MANIFA 2022	Best Playback Singer - Female	Pushparani Huidrom for the song "Nungsi Nungol Houna Tha"	Nominated	
10th MANIFA 2022	Best Supporting Actor - Male	Gurumayum Bonny	Nominated	
