= Nobap =

- Theatrical release poster
- Directed by: Heisnam Tomba
- Screenplay by: Y. Kumarjit
- Story by: Suresh Hidang
- Produced by: Suresh Hidang
- Starring: Raju Nong; Gokul Athokpam; Abenao Elangbam; Ranjana; Denil; Chingkheinganba; Santosh; Oliver Chiru; Russel; Robinson; Biken; Chingkhei
- Cinematography: Konjengbam Boong
- Edited by: Hodam Tommy
- Music by: O. Geet; Sound Designer: O. Boby; Music Composers: Tomba Thangjam; Bishe Moirangthem; Mangangsana
- Production company: The Second Millenium Mongoloids
- Distributed by: The Second Millenium Mongoloids
- Release date: 2009
- Running time: 150 minutes
- Country: India
- Language: Meiteilon (Manipuri)

Nobap (English: Pomelo) is a 2009 Manipuri film directed by Heisnam Tomba and written and produced by Suresh Hidang. It stars Raju Nong, Gokul Athokpam, Abenao Elangbam and Ranjana with master Denil, master Chingkheinganba, master Santosh, master Oliver Chiru, master Russel, master Robinson, master Biken and master Chingkhei in the lead roles. There is also special appearance of international footballer Renedy Singh in the film. It was the opening film at the 2nd Guwahati Film Festival 2009.

Nobap was also screened at Jawaharlal Nehru University (JNU), New Delhi on 13 January 2011.

== Plot ==
Eight boys deprived in all manners possible had spent their time kicking round a grapefruit in the meadows and dusty lanes of their small village. Now, they want to try their luck with a real football. In their quest and efforts to get a football, they find a friend in a lonely soul - the jeep driver whose jeep connects their small village with the outside world. When they do get the football, they find that their real struggle is only just the beginning. The football match becomes their lives' battles.

== Cast ==
- Raju Nong as Thambou
- Gokul Athokpam as Thanou
- Abenao Elangbam as Thaja
- Ranjana as Thoibi
- Master Denil
- Master Chingkheinganba
- Master Santosh
- Master Oliver Chiru
- Master Russel
- Master Robinson
- Master Biken
- Master Chingkhei
- R.K. Sorojini Devi as Thambou's mother
- Ayekpam Shanti
- Dhonen
- Renedy Singh (Special Appearance)

== Production ==
This film is the second production of The Second Millennium Mongoloids after producing the blockbuster film Meera Memcha.

== Accolades ==
Nobap won 10 awards at the 7th Manipur State Film Festival 2010, including the Best Feature Film award.

| Award | Category | Winner's name | Result |
|---|---|---|---|
| 7th Manipur State Film Festival 2010 | Best Feature Film | Director: Heisnam Tomba; Producer: Suresh Hidang | Won |
| 7th Manipur State Film Festival 2010 | Best Story | Suresh Hidang | Won |
| 7th Manipur State Film Festival 2010 | Best Screenplay | Y. Kumarjit | Won |
| 7th Manipur State Film Festival 2010 | Best Cinematography | Konjengbam Boong | Won |
| 7th Manipur State Film Festival 2010 | Best Audiography | O. Boby | Won |
| 7th Manipur State Film Festival 2010 | Best Editing | Bishe Moirangthem | Won |
| 7th Manipur State Film Festival 2010 | Best Art Direction | Bishe Moirangthem | Won |
| 7th Manipur State Film Festival 2010 | Best Male Playback Singer | Hamom Sadananda | Won |
| 7th Manipur State Film Festival 2010 | Special Jury Award | Abenao Elangbam | Won |

== Reception ==
R. K. Bidur Singh wrote in e-pao.org, "Making an enterprising team with Suresh Hidang, producer-writer-lyricist, Y. Kumarjit, screen playwright, Hodam Tommy and K. Boong, cinematographer and editor, O.Geet, music director etc., he comes up with a non-conventional film-Nobap. The plight of rural folks and eight kids in desperate need of football, but unable to afford one, kicking Nobap instead-are all well expressed in a comprehensible visual language. The film is skilfully intercut with humorous romantic interludes-Thambou and Thaja; Thanou and Thoibi.

Nobap is not a story that somebody tells you just to make you feel sorry for the poor people, it has other meaning and a shot's meaning can go very far beyond the subject. The film would have been better if a few sequences, such as apparent abduction of Thambou and child kidnapping for forced labour had been trimmed. They are neither sensibly treated nor developed as meaningful sub-plot.

★★★ : One for story-screenplay, one for sincerity and realistic attempt at the film making, one for eight frolicsome kids."

== Soundtrack ==
Bishe Moirangthem, Tomba Thangjam and Mangangsana composed the soundtrack for the film and wrote the lyrics. The songs are titled Laklo Thadoi Laklo Thoinu, Houda Houjillu Thok a ba Ama Lakchani and Pallubana Thamoi Ama.

| No. | Title | Lyrics | Singer(s) | Length |
|---|---|---|---|---|
| 1. | "Laklo Thadoi Laklo Thoinu" | Suresh Hidang | Nandeshori, Sophia, Master Surchand & Master Martin | 06:30 |
| 2. | "Houda Houjillu Thok a ba Ama Lakchani" | Suresh Hidang | Hamom Sadananda | 04:27 |
| 3. | "Pallubana Thamoi Ama" | Suresh Hidang | Raju Nong | 05:08 |
| Total length: | | | | 16:05 |
