= Kadarmapee =

Kadarmapee: Manja Nakada
- Theatrical release poster
- Directed by: L. Prakash
- Story by: Athokpam Tomchou
- Produced by: Kamala Saikhom
- Starring: Gokul Athokpam; Kamala Saikhom; Uttam Mayanglambam; Bala Hijam
- Cinematography: Bochou Saikhom; Still: Ajit
- Edited by: Balli
- Music by: Gopi (KOG); Bobbi Tonjam; Audiography: Balli
- Production company: Saikhom Films
- Distributed by: Saikhom Films
- Release dates: 4 November 2010 (Imphal); 14 November 2010 (Bangalore)
- Running time: 126 minutes
- Country: India
- Language: Meiteilon (Manipuri)

Kadarmapee: Manja Nakada (English: Trick Master) is a 2010 Manipuri comedy film directed by L. Prakash and produced by Kamala Saikhom under the banner of Saikhom Films. It stars Gokul Athokpam, Kamala Saikhom, Uttam Mayanglambam and Bala Hijam in the lead roles. The film was released at Bhagyachandra Open Air Theatre (BOAT), Imphal on 4 November 2010. It was also premiered at Bangalore, Koromangala (Game Village) NGV Club (Bowling Alley Hall) on 14 November 2010.

== Plot ==
While escaping from police, Yaima hides in Tamphasana's room. He spends the night in the latter's place. When Yoimayai (Tamphasana's fiancé) discovers this, he tries to chase Yaima away. Nungthil Chaibi, who is tricked by Yoimayai, tries to trap him. Yaima also tries to trick Tamphasana and make her fall for him.

== Cast ==
- Gokul Athokpam as Yaima
- Kamala Saikhom as Rajkumari Tamphasana
- Uttam Mayanglambam as Yoimayai
- Bala Hijam as Nungthil Chaibi
- Takhellambam Lokendra as Tamphasana's father
- Tayenjam Mema as Tamphasana's mother
- Omi as Nungthil Chaibi's father
- Thoudam Ongbi Modhubala as Nungthil Chaibi's mother
- Brajalal as Gouro
- Ngambi as Yaima's aunt
- Keiphah

== Soundtrack ==
Imocha Thiyam wrote the lyrics and Gopi (KOG) and Bobbi Tonjam composed the songs for the movie. Aphao, Eraileima, Mandakini Takhellambam and Uttam Mayanglambam are the playback singers.

No.	Title	Lyrics	Singer(s)	Length
1.	"Simatangdi Hairammu"	Imocha Thiyam	Aphao, Eraileima	05:20
2.	"Nangna Namai Kanbaga"	Imocha Thiyam	Uttam Mayanglambam, Mandakini Takhellambam	04:35
Total length:				9:55
