= Chumthang Makhong =

- Poster
- Directed by: Romi Meitei
- Screenplay by: Manaobi MM
- Story by: Manaobi MM
- Produced by: R.K. Chandrabal
- Starring: Hamom Sadananda; Jolly Irungbam; Abenao Elangbam; Thingom Pritam
- Cinematography: Aboi Meitei
- Edited by: Ch. Dinesh
- Music by: Tomba Thangjam
- Production company: Diana Films
- Distributed by: Diana Films
- Release date: 2008
- Running time: 139 minutes
- Country: India
- Language: Meiteilon (Manipuri)

Chumthang Makhong (English: The Base of Rainbow) is a 2008 Manipuri film directed by Romi Meitei and produced by R.K. Chandrabal under the banner of Diana Films. It stars Hamom Sadananda, Jolly Irungbam, Abenao Elangbam and Thingom Pritam in the lead roles. The film was theatrically released at Usha Cinema, Paona Bazar and many other cinema halls of Manipur in 2009 and performed well at the box office.

The film got official selection at the 7th Manipur State Film Festival 2010.

== Cast ==
- Hamom Sadananda as Priyoranjan
- Jolly Irungbam as Linthoi
- Abenao Elangbam as Priyo's sister
- Thingom Pritam as Rojesh
- Ahanjao as Priyo's father
- R.K. Hemabati as Linthoi's mother
- Takhellambam Lokendra as Linthoi's father
- Wangkhem Lalitkumar as Mangangkhomba
- Tonjam Hemlet as Tiger
- Manihar
- Sanatombi
- Nomita
- Robert
- R.K. Mangalsana
- Tarunkumar
- Prem
- Somorendro

== Soundtrack ==
Tomba Thangjam composed the soundtrack for the movie and Narendra Ningomba and Romi Meitei wrote the lyrics. Maibam Roshibina, Hamom Sadananda and Students of Tomba Thangjam are the playback singers. The movie has four songs.
