= Fried Fish, Chicken Soup and a Premiere Show =

2011 Indian documentary

- Poster
- Directed by: Mamta Murthy
- Written by: Mamta Murthy
- Produced by: Madhusree Dutta
- Starring: Manaobi MM; H. Neki
- Cinematography: Hodam Tommy Singh
- Edited by: Rikhav Desai
- Music by: Arjun Sen
- Production company: Majlis
- Distributed by: Majlis
- Release date: 2011
- Running time: 90 minutes
- Country: India
- Languages: English & Meiteilon (Manipuri)

Fried Fish, Chicken Soup and a Premiere Show is a 2011 documentary, Indian Meiteilon-English bilingual film directed by Mamta Murthy and produced by Madhusree Dutta. It is presented by Majlis. The movie won the National Film Award for Best Arts/Cultural Film at the 59th National Film Awards. It had participated in many international film festivals like South Asian International Film Festival, New York; CPH:DOX Copenhagen and Asiatica Film Mediale, Rome. The movie got selection in the Bandra Film Festival 2021.

As part of its 2026 recommendations, Firstpost included the film in a list of five Manipuri films to watch.

== Synopsis ==
Set in Manipur, a conflict region on the remote India-Burma border, the film journeys across a century to paint a portrait of a cinema and its citizens. The film centers around shooting, production and release of the 2010 Manipuri movie 21st Century's Kunti.

== Cast ==
- Manaobi MM
- H. Neki
- Y. Gandhi
- Muhindro
- Gokul Athokpam
- Maya Choudhury
- Denny Likmabam
- Bala Hijam
- Joseph Thokchom

== Accolades ==
The movie won the National Film Award for Best Arts/Cultural Film at the 59th National Film Awards. The citation for the National Award reads, "For taking us on a journey that chronicles the struggle to produce films in strife torn Manipur and in the process painting a vivid canvas, which captures cinema in the state as a medium of popular culture".

It also won the International Jury Award at the Mumbai International Film Festival 2012. The film bagged the Best Documentary Award at the 6th SiGNS Festival, Kerala 2012.
