= Soma Laishram =

Indian actress and singer

- Born: 5 January 1992 (age 34); Keishampat Dhobi Machu Leirak, Imphal, Manipur
- Occupations: Actress; Singer; Politician
- Years active: 2010–present
- Political party: Republican Party of India (Athawale) (2021–present)

Soma Laishram (born 5 January 1992) is an Indian actress, singer and politician who appears in Manipuri films. She is a native of Imphal, Manipur. Nurei, Hoo Chaage, Loibataare Ta Raju, and Chanu IPS are some of her famous movies.

== Acting career ==
Hingbagee Mahao, Nangna Nokpa Yengningi, Nungshi Feijei, Tomthin Shija, Enakta Leiringei, Khurai Angaobi, Ima Machet Icha Tangkhai and Chanu IPS 2 are some of her notable films.

A solo music album Angaoba Malang was also released where she sang in her own voice and acted. As of 2017, she has acted in a Meitei-Portuguese music video Nura Pakhang (Eu e Tu), directed by Romi Meitei and sung by Mangka Mayanglambam and Manuela Clã.

Her role as Thoinu in Enakta Leiringei earned her a place on Screen Echoes Manipur’s list of the Best 8 Performances in Manipuri Cinema in the Last Decade.

=== Controversy ===
Following her participation in a fashion show in Delhi as a showstopper, Soma was banned from participating in films and social events for three years by the Imphal-based civil group Kanglei Kanba Lup on 18 September 2023. As a result of the 2023 Manipur violence, which has resulted in the deaths of more than 170 people, the group asserted that Soma's participation went against the widespread request for actors to abstain from such events.

Talking about the ban, Soma stated the following:

I strongly oppose this (directive); as an artist and a social influencer, I have every right to speak up wherever I want to and whenever it is needed... I have not done anything against my state and my motherland.

On 30 September, Kangleipak Kanba Lup withdrew the ban after acknowledging that it was a mistake to place the ban on Soma Laishram.

== Political career ==
On 29 September 2021, Laishram joined the Republican Party of India (Athawale) (RPI-A). She was appointed the president of the State Youth Girls' wing.

== Selected filmography ==
- All films are in Meitei unless otherwise noted.

Year	Film	Role	Director
2010	Phijang Marumda	Linthoi	K. Bimol Sharma
2011	Leima	Mona	Ojitkumar Elangbam
2011	Loibataare Ta Raju	Soochi	Pilu H.
2012	Ang Tamo	Geeta	Pilu H.
2012	Hiktharaba Samji (Pizza)	Thoi	Romi Meitei
2012	Lal Leipakta Laiphao	Leishna	L. Prakash
2012	Taku Ramthar	Sanarembi	Ojitbabu Ningthoujam
2013	Sanadi Sanani	Thadoi	Khoibam Homeshwori
2013	Lanpham (The Endless Destiny)	Laija	Vir Bhadra Yumnam
2013	Thajagee Maihing	Linthoi	Romi Meitei
2013	Ani x Ani = Mari	Thaja	Jeetendra Ningomba
2013	Amamba Sayon	Mary Golson	Johnson Mayanglambam
2014	Hoo Chaage	Mitkhubi	Denny Likmabam
2015	Toro	Toro	Kirmil Soraisam
2015	Hingbagee Mahao	Mary	Jeetendra Ningomba
2015	Nangna Nokpa Yengningi	Memi	Ajit Ningthouja
2015	Nungshi Feijei	Nungshibi	Chou En Lai
2016	Nungshi Feijei 2	Nungshibi	Chou En Lai
2016	Nanggee Shaktam Nungshiba Helli	Linthoi	O. Gautam
2017	Tomthin Shija	Tomba	Bobby Haobam
2017	Enakta Leiringei	Thoinu	Manoranjan Longjam
2017	Echan gi Laidhi	Langlen	Rakesh Moirangthem
2017	Mitlu	Thadoi	Gyaneshwor Konj
2017	Akhunba Takhellei	Takhellei	Ojitbabu Ningthoujam
2017	Kaongamdraba Facebook	Nungshi	AK. Gyaneshori
2017	Eibu Hingkhora Eibu Sikhrora	Henjathoibi	Tej Salam
2018	Leishabigee Macha	Panthoi	Jeetendra Ningomba
2018	Nurei	Nurei	Rakesh Moirangthem
2018	Hiyai	Yoihenbi	Herojit Naoroibam
2018	Yotpi	Mayolsana	Romi Meitei
2018	Chanu IPS	Laisna	Sanaton Nongthomba
2018	Leichilda Pallaba Thaja	Ayingbi	Pilu H.
2019	Kao Phaaba	Leina	Ishomani
2019	Ningthiba Nonglik	Nonglik	M. Nirmala Chanu
2019	Khurai Angaobi	Nganthoi	Sudhir Kangjam
2019	Ningthou	Nungsi	Geet Yumnam
2019	Chanu IPS 2	Laisna	Sanaton Nongthomba
2021	Ima Machet Icha Tangkhai	Sakhenbi	Homeshwori
2021	Happugi Mondrang	Sangbannabi	Ojitbabu Ningthoujam
2022	Thang Chani	Leina	Bimol Phibou
2022	Lairembi	Thaba	Sudhir Kangjam
2024	Una Una	Sillei	Irel Luwang
2024	Taru Tarubi	Taru	Hemanta Khuman
2025	Nongmadol Thaja	Thaja	Sudhir Kangjam
2025	Shaktam	Lalleibi	Ojitbabu Ningthoujam
2025	Hainabado Chumle	Ayeengbi	Sudhir Kangjam
2025	Loukrakpam Ningol	Loukrakpam Abe	Thoiba Soibam
2025	Bamon Ebemma	Tampha	Bijgupta Laishram
2026	Yeknabi	Thoi	Michael Huidrom
2026	Kanana Helli	Tamna	Hei Sanjit
Upcoming	Nungshi Lairembi	Juhi	Thoiba Soibam
Upcoming	Ahingsina Loidringei		O. Gautam

== Accolades ==
Laishram was honoured with different titles at film awards and festivals.

Award	Category	Film	Ref.
11th Manipur State Film Awards 2018	Best Actor in a Lead Role - Female	Enakta Leiringei	
10th MANIFA 2022	Best Supporting Actor - Female	Ima Machet Icha Tangkhai	
17th Manipur State Film Awards 2025	Special Mention (Lead Actor - Female)	Una Una	
