= Meitan Araba =

2019 film

- Theatrical release poster
- Directed by: Lukanand Kshetrimayum
- Written by: Sen Sagolsem
- Produced by: Kshetrimayum Bimal Singh
- Starring: Brahmacharimayum Dishiraj; Avi Khundrakpam
- Cinematography: Irom Maipak
- Music by: Tiken Takhellambam
- Production company: Rajkumari Kamalasana Films
- Distributed by: Rajkumari Kamalasana Films
- Release date: 6 January 2019
- Country: India
- Language: Meiteilon (Manipuri)

Meitan Araba is a 2019 Manipuri film directed by Lukanand Kshetrimayum and written by Sen Sagolsem. The film features Brahmacharimayum Dishiraj and Avi Khundrakpam in the lead roles. The film was certified in 2018 and released on 6 January 2019 at MSFDS (Manipur State Film Development Society), Palace Compound, Imphal. The film earned 11 nominations at the 8th SSS MANIFA 2019, winning 7 awards including the Best Feature Film Award.

== Cast ==
- Brahmacharimayum Dishiraj
- Avi Khundrakpam
- Abenao Elangbam
- Idhou
- Laishram Lalitabi
- Takhellambam Lokendra

== Accolades ==
Meitan Araba won the Best Feature Film award and many other awards at the 8th Sahitya Seva Samiti Awards (SSS MANIFA) 2019.

Award	Category	Winner's name	Result
12th Manipur State Film Awards 2019	Best Cinematography	Irom Maipak	Won
12th Manipur State Film Awards 2019	Best Feature Film - Debut	Director: Lukanand Kshetrimayum; Producer: Ksh. Bimal Singh	Won
12th Manipur State Film Awards 2019	Best Child Artist	Brahmacharimayum Dishiraj	Won
12th Manipur State Film Awards 2019	Best Supporting Actor - Male	Avi Khundrakpam	Won
12th Manipur State Film Awards 2019	Special Jury Mention	Chakpram Rameshchandra (Idhou)	Won
8th SSS MANIFA 2019	Best Feature Film	Director: Lukanand Kshetrimayum; Producer: Ksh. Bimal Singh	Won
8th SSS MANIFA 2019	Best Direction	Lukanand Kshetrimayum	Won
8th SSS MANIFA 2019	Best Child Artist	Brahmacharimayum Dishiraj	Won
8th SSS MANIFA 2019	Best Background Score	Tiken Takhellambam	Won
8th SSS MANIFA 2019	Best Art Director	Rajkumari Kamalasana Films Studio	Won
8th SSS MANIFA 2019	Best Cinematography	Irom Maipak	Won
8th SSS MANIFA 2019	Best Screenplay	Sen Sagolsem	Won
8th SSS MANIFA 2019	Best Playback Singer - Male	Huidrom Nowboy	Nominated
8th SSS MANIFA 2019	Best Music Director	Tiken Takhellambam	Nominated
8th SSS MANIFA 2019	Best Editing	Lukanand Kshetrimayum	Nominated
8th SSS MANIFA 2019	Best Actor in a Leading Role - Male	Avi Khundrakpam	Nominated
