= Hingbagee Mahao =

- Theatrical release poster
- Directed by: Jeetendra Ningomba
- Screenplay by: Jeetendra Ningomba
- Story by: Jeetendra Ningomba
- Produced by: Kachi Shanti
- Starring: Sagolsem Dhanamanjuri; SP Ingocha Yanglem; Hamom Sadananda; Abenao Elangbam
- Cinematography: R.K. Surjit; Saratchandra
- Edited by: R.K. Surjit
- Music by: Rabei Keishamcha
- Production company: Shaheba Films
- Distributed by: Shaheba Films
- Release date: 29 April 2015
- Running time: 148 minutes
- Country: India
- Language: Meiteilon (Manipuri)

Hingbagee Mahao (English: The Taste of Living) is a 2015 Manipuri film directed by Jeetendra Ningomba and produced by Kachi Shanti. The story and screenplay of the film was written by Jeetendra Ningomba. Hingbagee Mahao was released at Bhagyachandra Open Air Theatre (BOAT), Imphal, on 29 April 2015. It won many awards, including the Best Feature Film Award at 5th SSS MANIFA 2016.

== Cast ==
- Sagolsem Dhanamanjuri as Ningol
- SP Ingocha Yanglem as Mangoljao
- Hamom Sadananda as Achouba
- Vidyananda Laishram as Yaima
- Roshan Pheiroijam as Atomba
- Abenao Elangbam as Linthoi
- Soma Laishram as Mary
- Reshmi Sorokhaibam as Leina
- Narendra Ningomba as Mary's Father
- Gurumayum Ananta as Doctor

== Accolades ==
Hingbagee Mahao won many awards and nominations, including the Best Feature Film Award at the 5th SSS MANIFA 2016 held by Sahitya Seva Samiti, Kakching and Film Forum Manipur.

Award	Category	Winner's name	Result
5th SSS MANIFA 2016	Best Feature Film	Director: Jeetendra Ningomba; Producer: Kachi Shanti	Won
5th SSS MANIFA 2016	Best Director	Jeetendra Ningomba	Won
5th SSS MANIFA 2016	Best Actor in a Leading Role	Hamom Sadananda	Won
5th SSS MANIFA 2016	Best Story	Jeetendra Ningomba	Won
5th SSS MANIFA 2016	Best Cinematography	R.K. Surjit; Saratchandra	Won
5th SSS MANIFA 2016	Best Music Director	Rabei Keishamcha	Won

== Soundtrack ==
Rabei Keishamcha composed the soundtrack for the film and Jeetendra Ningomba wrote the lyrics. The songs are titled Sajik Thabagum Nganduna and Uragasu Wahalli.

Hingbagee Mahao

Soundtrack album by Khumanthem Sundari, Dipu Khunung, Cheche, Huidrom Nowboy, Surma Chanu
- Genre: Feature film soundtrack
- Length: 11:00
- Label: Shaheba Films

No.	Title	Lyrics	Music	Singer(s)	Length
1.	"Sajik Thabagum Nganduna"	Jeetendra Ningomba	Rabei Keishamcha	Khumanthem Sundari, Dipu Khunung, Cheche	05:28
2.	"Uragasu Wahalli"	Jeetendra Ningomba	Rabei Keishamcha	Huidrom Nowboy, Surma Chanu	05:32
Total length:					11:00
