= Tomthin Shija =

- Theatrical release poster
- Directed by: Bobby Haobam
- Written by: Binoranjan Oinam
- Produced by: Geeta Konsam
- Starring: Maya Choudhury; Amar Mayanglambam
- Cinematography: Sanjoy Ch.
- Edited by: Inaocha Khundrakpam
- Music by: Tony Aheibam
- Production company: Bigkons Entertainment
- Distributed by: Khonjel Entertainment
- Release date: 23 September 2017
- Running time: 130 minutes
- Country: India
- Language: Meiteilon (Manipuri)

Tomthin Shija (English: My Mom & Me) is a 2017 Manipuri film directed by Bobby Haobam, written by Binoranjan Oinam and produced by Geeta Konsam. The film features Maya Choudhury and Amar Mayanglambam in the titular roles. It was released on 23 September 2017 at MSFDS (Manipur State Film Development Society), Palace Compound, Imphal and Indrani Hall, Kakching. The movie was also premiered at Hindu College Auditorium, North Campus, University of Delhi, on 14 October 2017.

== Cast ==
- Maya Choudhury as Dr. Ayingbi Shija, Tomthin's Mother
- Amar Mayanglambam as Tomthin Rajkumar
- Soma Laishram as Tomba
- Raju Nong as Tomthin's Father
- Idhou as Tomthin's Grandfather
- Elangbam Indu as Tomthin's Grandmother
- Sagolsem Dhanamanjuri as Maibi
- Sweety Wahengbam as Thadoi
- Gurumayum Bonny as Fisherman (Cameo Appearance)
- Leishangthem Tonthoi as Fisherman's Wife (Cameo Appearance)

== Accolades ==
Tomthin Shija won Best Cinematography and Best Costume Designer awards at the 7th Sahitya Seva Samiti Awards (SSS MANIFA) 2018. At the 11th Manipur State Film Awards 2018, Chakpram Rameshchandra (Idhou) won the Best Supporting Actor - Male and Biju Kshetri was conferred the Best Special Effect Award.

Award	Category	Winner's name	Result
7th SSS MANIFA 2018	Best Cinematography	Sanjoy Chingangbam	Won
7th SSS MANIFA 2018	Best Costume Designer	Karan Thokchom & Mantri Meitei	Won
7th SSS MANIFA 2018	Best Make-Up	Napolean Top	Nominated
11th Manipur State Film Awards 2018	Best Supporting Actor - Male	Chakpram Rameshchandra (Idhou)	Won
11th Manipur State Film Awards 2018	Best Special Effect	Biju Kshetri	Won

== Soundtrack ==
Tony Aheibam composed the soundtrack for the film and Binoranjan Oinam wrote the lyrics. The songs are titled Nangdi Thajani and Waroude.

Tomthin Shija

Soundtrack album by Arbin Soibam, Surma Chanu, Raju Nong, Pushparani Huidrom
- Genre: Feature film soundtrack
- Length: 12:52
- Label: Bigkons Entertainment

No.	Title	Lyrics	Music	Singer(s)	Length
1.	"Nangdi Thajani"	Binoranjan Oinam	Tony Aheibam	Arbin Soibam, Surma Chanu	04:47
2.	"Waroude"	Binoranjan Oinam	Tony Aheibam	Arbin Soibam, Surma Chanu, Raju Nong, Pushparani Huidrom	08:05
Total length:					12:52
