= Chanu IPS 2 =

Film directed by Sanaton Nongthomba

- Theatrical release poster
- Directed by: Sanaton Nongthomba
- Screenplay by: Chingkhei Thok
- Story by: Sanaton Nongthomba
- Produced by: Linthoi Chanu
- Starring: Gokul Athokpam; Soma Laishram; Bala Hijam
- Cinematography: Ibomcha, Sanjit XL, Naobi Kangla, Mohon Kangla, R.K. Surjit, Dhamen, Sushil, Brigesh
- Edited by: R.K. Surjit
- Music by: Vivek Ali Chongtham; Nanao Sagolmang
- Production company: Nongthombam Films
- Distributed by: Nongthombam Films
- Release date: 31 October 2019
- Running time: 160 minutes
- Country: India
- Language: Meiteilon (Manipuri)

Chanu IPS 2 is a 2019 Manipuri film directed by Sanaton Nongthomba and produced by Linthoi Chanu, under the banner of Nongthombam Films. The film features Gokul Athokpam, Soma Laishram and Bala Hijam in the lead roles. The film was premiered at Manipur State Film Development Society (MSFDS), Palace Compound on 31 October 2019.

It is a sequel to the 2017 film Chanu IPS.

== Cast ==
- Gokul Athokpam as Khaba
- Soma Laishram as Laisna (Chanu IPS)
- Bala Hijam as Laija
- Heisnam Geeta as Khaba's adopted mother
- Sagolsem Dhanamanjuri as Laija's mother
- Linthoi Chanu as Laisna's sister-in-law
- Tayenjam Mema
- Laimayum Gaitri
- Irom Shyamkishore
- Gunchenba Nongthombam
- Loya
- Khekman Ratan
- Ashok
- Jenny

== Soundtrack ==
Vivek Ali Chongtham and Nanao Sagolmang composed the soundtrack for the film and Sanaton Nongthomba wrote the lyrics. The songs are titled Nakokta Napi Pakle and Mityengsina Uriba.

Chanu IPS 2

Soundtrack album by Surma Chanu, Badal, Sushmita Mangsatabam, Aj Maisnam
- Released: 2019
- Genre: Feature film soundtrack
- Length: 8:27
- Label: Nongthombam Films

No.	Title	Lyrics	Music	Singer(s)	Length
1.	"Nakokta Napi Pakle"	Sanaton Nongthomba	Nanao Sagolmang	Surma Chanu, Badal	04:18
2.	"Mityengsina Uriba"	Sanaton Nongthomba	Vivek Ali Chongtham	Sushmita Mangsatabam, Aj Maisnam	04:09
Total length:					8:27
