= Nangna Nokpa Yengningi =

- Theatrical release poster
- Directed by: Ajit Ningthouja
- Screenplay by: Herojit Naoroibam
- Story by: Herojit Naoroibam
- Produced by: Th. (O) Bedamani Devi
- Starring: Bonium Thokchom; Soma Laishram
- Cinematography: Mohon Kangla
- Edited by: Ajit Ningthouja
- Music by: Amarjit Lourembam
- Production company: Real Screen Picture
- Distributed by: Real Screen Picture
- Release date: 6 November 2015
- Country: India
- Language: Meiteilon (Manipuri)

Nangna Nokpa Yengningi (English: Want to See You Smile) is a 2015 Manipuri film directed by Ajit Ningthouja, written by Herojit Naoroibam and produced by Th. (O) Bedamani Devi, presented by Poknapham. It stars Bonium Thokchom and Soma Laishram in the lead roles. The film was released on 6 November 2015 at Bhagyachandra Open Air Theatre (BOAT).

== Cast ==
- Bonium Thokchom as Amujao
- Soma Laishram as Memi
- Sagolsem Dhanamanjuri
- Ratan Lai as Pheijao
- Hamom Sadananda as Memi's brother
- Denny Likmabam as Ibohal
- Merina Laishangbam as Memi's sister-in-law
- Laimayum Gaitri as Matouleibi
- Elangbam Indu as Amujao's Mother
- Hamom Purnanda
- Suresh Melei

== Production ==
The shooting of the film completed within 10 days. This film is the first production of Real Screen Picture. The blessing ceremony (yaipha thouni thouram) was held on April 17, 2015.

== Accolades ==
The movie bagged three awards at the 5th SSS MANIFA 2016 held by Sahitya Seva Samiti, Kakching and Film Forum Manipur.

Award	Category	Winner's name	Result
5th SSS MANIFA 2016	Best Playback Singer - Male	Bonium Thokchom	Won
5th SSS MANIFA 2016	Best Playback Singer - Female	Pushparani Huidrom	Won
5th SSS MANIFA 2016	Best Lyrics	Herojit Naoroibam	Won

== Soundtrack ==
Amarjit Lourembam composed the soundtrack for the film and Herojit Naoroibam wrote the lyrics. The songs are titled Nangna Nokpa Yengningi and Nangbu Nungshirure.

No.	Title	Lyrics	Music	Singer(s)	Length
1.	"Nangna Nokpa Yengningi"	Herojit Naoroibam	Amarjit Lourembam	Bonium Thokchom, Pushparani Huidrom	06:45
2.	"Nangbu Nungshirure"	Herojit Naoroibam	Amarjit Lourembam	Bonium Thokchom	05:31
Total length:					12:16
