= Tayai =

- Poster
- Directed by: K. Bimol Sharma
- Screenplay by: Y. Kumarjit
- Story by: Gokul Athokpam
- Produced by: Gokul Athokpam
- Starring: Gokul Athokpam; Kaiku Rajkumar; Lairenjam Olen; Huirem Seema; Premeshori; Laishram Binata
- Cinematography: K. Bimol Sharma
- Edited by: K. Bimol Sharma
- Music by: Ranbir Thouna
- Production companies: Subhas and Sons'
- Distributed by: Subhas and Sons'
- Release date: 16 November 2008
- Running time: 160 minutes
- Country: India
- Language: Meiteilon (Manipuri)

Tayai is a 2008 Manipuri film directed by K. Bimol Sharma and produced by Gokul Athokpam under the banner of Subhas and Sons'. It stars Gokul Athokpam, Kaiku Rajkumar, Lairenjam Olen, Huirem Seema, Premeshori and Laishram Binata in the lead roles. The premiere show of the movie was held at Asha Cinema on 16 November 2008.

The film got official selection at the 7th Manipur State Film Festival 2010.

== Cast ==
- Gokul Athokpam as Yaima
- Lairenjam Olen as Ibochouba
- Kaiku Rajkumar as Mani
- Huirem Seema as Tharo
- Premeshori as Langlen
- Laishram Binata as Tamphasana
- Gurumayum Priyogopal as Ibochouba's father
- Hidangmayum Guna as Thoiba
- Tayenjam Mema as Shopkeeper
- Heisnam Geeta as Ibochouba's mother
- Benu Ayekpam as Yaima's vehicle owner
- Shougrakpam Hemanta as Teacher
- Rajkumar Amarjeet as Tharo's ex-boyfriend (Guest appearance)
- O. Mangi as Leishabi
- Rojesh
- Rajesh
- Chingkhei Huidrom as Yaima (Child)
- Huidrom Clington as Ibochouba (Child)
- Sneha as Langlen (Child)
- Saya as Tamphasana (Child)

== Soundtrack ==
Ranbir Thouna composed the soundtrack for the film and Biramangol Mekola wrote the lyrics. The song is titled Awabana Saruk Oiraba.

No.	Title	Lyrics	Music	Singer(s)	Length
1.	"Awabana Saruk Oiraba"	Biramangol Mekola	Ranbir Thouna	Huidrom Nowboy	06:13
Total length:					6:13
