= Cheina =

- Poster
- Directed by: Oken Amakcham
- Screenplay by: Yumnam Rajendra
- Story by: Yumnam Rajendra
- Produced by: Shanti Thokchom
- Starring: Gurumayum Kalpana; Khuraijam Lingjelthoibi; Wahengbam Somoraj; Thingom Pritam
- Cinematography: Irom Maipak
- Edited by: Ujjal Nandy
- Music by: Oken Amakcham; Audiography: A. Shantimo Sharma
- Production company: Dashu Films
- Distributed by: Dashu Films
- Release date: 18 January 2003
- Running time: 127 minutes
- Country: India
- Language: Meiteilon (Manipuri)

Cheina (English: The Agony) is a 2003 Manipuri film directed by Oken Amakcham and produced by Shanti Thokchom. It stars Gurumayum Kalpana, Khuraijam Lingjelthoibi, Wahengbam Somoraj and Thingom Pritam in the lead roles. The story and screenplay was written by Yumnam Rajendra and produced under the banner of Dashu Films. The film got censor certificate on 30 December 2002 and was released on 18 January 2003 at Usha Cinema, Paona Bazar, Imphal.

== Cast ==
- Gurumayum Kalpana as Yumnam Thanil Devi
- Khuraijam Lingjelthoibi as Tharo
- Wahengbam Somoraj as Thabal
- Thingom Pritam as Thambousana
- Chandrahas as Thembung
- Laishram Lalitabi as Tharo's mother
- Oken Amakcham as Doctor
- Mangangsana Mayanglambam as Pena player
- Baby Sanjeeta
- Jagdish
- Gouranityai
- Nenu
- Bimol
- Hemabati
- Karuna
- Bharat

== Accolades ==
The movie won the Best Feature Film award at the 6th Manipur State Film Festival 2006.

| Award | Category | Winner's name | Result |
|---|---|---|---|
| 6th Manipur State Film Festival 2006 | Best Feature Film | Shanti Thokchom (Producer); Oken Amakcham (Director) | Won |
| 6th Manipur State Film Festival 2006 | Best Director | Oken Amakcham | Won |
| 6th Manipur State Film Festival 2006 | Best Script | Yumnam Rajendra | Won |

== Soundtrack ==
Oken Amakcham composed the soundtrack for the film and Sarat Yumnam, R.K. Lalmani and Y. Swarnalata wrote the lyrics. The songs are titled Leinam Leinam, Punshigi Ahanba, Tanglou Thenglaba and Thabal Pharaba Ahing.

Cheina

Soundtrack album by Dinesh Sharma, Pushparani Huidrom
- Released: 2003
- Genre: Feature film soundtrack
- Length: 21:25
- Label: Dashu Films
- Producer: Shanti Thokchom
External audio
- Audio Jukebox on YouTube

| No. | Title | Lyrics | Music | Singer(s) | Length |
|---|---|---|---|---|---|
| 1. | "Leinam Leinam" | Sarat Yumnam, R.K. Lalmani | Oken Amakcham | Pushparani Huidrom | 05:32 |
| 2. | "Punshigi Ahanba" | R.K. Lalmani | Oken Amakcham | Dinesh Sharma, Pushparani Huidrom | 05:12 |
| 3. | "Tanglou Thenglaba" | Y. Swarnalata | Oken Amakcham | Pushparani Huidrom | 05:10 |
| 4. | "Thabal Pharaba" | Sarat Yumnam | Oken Amakcham | Dinesh Sharma | 05:31 |
| Total length: | | | | | 21:25 |
