= Tabunungda Akaiba Likli =

- Theatrical release poster
- Directed by: Romi Meitei
- Screenplay by: Herojit Naoroibam
- Story by: Jibanlata
- Produced by: Barun Elangbam
- Starring: Gokul Athokpam; Abenao Elangbam; Hamom Sadananda; Artina Thoudam
- Cinematography: Radhamohon
- Edited by: Johni & John
- Production company: Pibarel Films
- Distributed by: Pibarel Films
- Release date: 21 September 2013
- Running time: 155 minutes
- Country: India
- Language: Meiteilon (Manipuri)

Tabunungda Akaiba Likli (transl. Broken Glass Inside) is a 2013 Manipuri film directed by Romi Meitei and produced by Barun Elangbam. It stars Gokul Athokpam, Abenao Elangbam, Hamom Sadananda and Artina Thoudam in the lead, with Deky, Dhanapriya, Priyogopal and Modhubala portraying supporting roles. It is a love triangle film. The film was premiered at Manipur Film Development Corporation (MFDC) on 21 September 2013. It was also premiered at Dussehra Ground Mukherjee Nagar, New Delhi on 28 September 2013.

== Cast ==
- Gokul Athokpam as Ningthem
- Abenao Elangbam as Thoibi
- Artina Thoudam as Phajabi
- Hamom Sadananda as Businessman
- Gurumayum Priyogopal as Thoibi's father
- Thoudam Ongbi Modhubala as Ningthem's mother
- Deky Khundrakpam as Maipak
- Dhanapriya as Bembem, Maipak's girlfriend

== Production ==
This movie is the second production of Pibarel Films, after producing Sadananda-Kamala starrer Khangdreda Nongdamba. The shooting of the film was done in Manipur and New Delhi.

== Accolades ==
It won many awards at the 3rd Sahitya Seva Samiti Manipuri Film Award (SSS MANIFA) 2014, organised by Sahitya Seva Samiti, Kakching and Film Forum Manipur, at Kakching Khullen Ibudhou Khamlangba Laikol on 21 April 2014.

| Award | Category | Winner's name | Result |
|---|---|---|---|
| 3rd SSS MANIFA 2014 | Best Feature Film | Director: Romi Meitei; Producer: Barun Elangbam | Won |
| 3rd SSS MANIFA 2014 | Best Director | Romi Meitei | Won |
| 3rd SSS MANIFA 2014 | Best Actress in a Leading Role | Abenao Elangbam | Won |
| 3rd SSS MANIFA 2014 | Best Actor in a Supporting Role | Hamom Sadananda | Won |
| 3rd SSS MANIFA 2014 | Best Playback Singer - Male | Hamom Sadananda | Won |
| 3rd SSS MANIFA 2014 | Best Playback Singer - Female | Chitra Pangambam for the song "Hey Shakhangdaba Nungshiba" | Won |
