= Enakta Leiringei =

2017 Manipuri film, India

- Theatrical release poster
- Directed by: Manoranjan Longjam
- Written by: Anil Longjam
- Produced by: Ironball Team; Premchand Lambamayum
- Starring: Kaiku Rajkumar; Soma Laishram
- Cinematography: Regan Khangembam
- Edited by: Premananda Nongthombam
- Production company: Anil Longjam Productions
- Distributed by: Ironball
- Release date: 28 October 2017
- Running time: 134 minutes
- Country: India
- Language: Meiteilon (Manipuri)

Enakta Leiringei (English: When You're Near Me) is a 2017 Manipuri film directed by Manoranjan Longjam. It stars Kaiku Rajkumar and Soma Laishram in the lead roles. Enakta Leiringei got Best Feature Film award at the 11th Manipur State Film Awards 2018. It was released at Manipur State Film Development Society (MSFDS), Palace Compound, on 28 October 2017. It had its regular theatrical screenings at Usha Cinema, Paona Bazar in July 2018.

== Synopsis ==
Khaba and Thoinu met on their journey to Jiribam, and the series of events that followed during the journey changed their lives forever.

== Cast ==
- Kaiku Rajkumar as Khaba
- Soma Laishram as Thoinu
- Redy Yumnam as Thoinu's love interest
- Leishangthem Rahul
- Narmada Shougaijam
- Ningthoujam Rina as Thoinu's Mother
- Oinam Gyaneswori
- Devita Urikhinbam as Khaba's sister-in-law (Guest Appearance)

== Production ==
The role of Khaba in the film was initially offered to Gurumayum Bonny, but due to his tight schedule, he rejected the offer. The shooting of the film took more than a year to complete due to certain social and political issues in Manipur.

== Promotions ==
Enakta Leiringei was promoted in the Saturday Night Show of Manung Hutna, Impact TV, hosted by Raj Nongthombam on 23 September 2017, ahead of its release at MSFDS, Imphal.

== Accolades ==
Enakta Leiringei won many awards at the 11th Manipur State Film Awards 2018, including the Best Feature Film award.

Award	Category	Winner's name	Result
11th Manipur State Film Awards 2018	Best Feature Film	Director: Manoranjan Longjam; Producer: Premchand Lambamayum	Won
11th Manipur State Film Awards 2018	Best Director	Manoranjan Longjam	Won
11th Manipur State Film Awards 2018	Best Actor	Kaiku Rajkumar	Won
11th Manipur State Film Awards 2018	Best Actress	Soma Laishram	Won
11th Manipur State Film Awards 2018	Best Screenplay	Anil Longjam	Won
11th Manipur State Film Awards 2018	Best Cinematography	Regan Khangembam	Won
11th Manipur State Film Awards 2018	Best Editing	Premananda Nongthombam	Won

== Soundtrack ==
Jimbo Ningombam composed the soundtrack for the film and Anil Longjam, M. K. Binodini Devi and Jimbo Ningombam wrote the lyrics. The songs are titled Enakta Leiringei, Karamba Jugki and Etaa.

Enakta Leiringei

Soundtrack album by Pushparani Huidrom, June Neelu, Anil Thiyam
- Studio: Hayum Studio; Shallow River Studio; CCC Media
- Genre: Feature film soundtrack
- Length: 12:15
- Label: Ironball Production

No.	Title	Lyrics	Music	Singer(s)	Length
1.	"Enakta Leiringei"	Anil Longjam	Jimbo Ningombam	Pushparani Huidrom	03:57
2.	"Karamba Jugki"	M. K. Binodini Devi	Jimbo Ningombam; Aribam Syam Sharma (Original Tune)	June Neelu	04:16
3.	"Etaa"	Jimbo Ningombam	Jimbo Ningombam	Arun Thiyam	04:02
Total length:					12:15
