= Bonium Thokchom =

Indian actor and singer from Manipur

- Born: Bonium Thokchom; 16 October 1988; Kongba Nandeibam Leikai, Imphal, Manipur, India
- Occupations: Actor, singer, social worker
- Parent(s): Thokchom Loken; Thokchom (O) Bedamani

Bonium Thokchom is an Indian actor and singer who predominantly appears in Manipuri films. He has also acted in many Shumang Kumhei plays and music videos. He is best known for his song Wakhalgee.

== Early life and education ==
Thokchom lives in Kongba Nandeibam Leikai, Imphal, Manipur. He was born as a second child to Thokchom Loken and Thokchom Ongbi Bedamani. He has eight siblings including three sisters.

He completed his graduation from D.M. College under the Manipur University.

== Career ==
He started his career as an anchor in ISTV Network's Hello Hello Programme and as an interviewer in the local cable television network.

His first appearance in movies was a supporting role in Romi Meitei's Ekhenglaktagi Red Rose. His first film in which he portrays the main antagonist is Ajit Ningthouja's Meerang Mahum, and he appears as a lead male protagonist in Nangna Nokpa Yengningi.

His home production Bonium Thokchom Films (BTF) was launched in 2016, under which a film titled Soinairaba Thamoi was produced. The film was released on 14 July 2018.

As of 2018, he started working on the movie Eephuut as a producer and an actor. It is written and directed by Herojit Naoroibam.

== Accolades ==
Thokchom won the Best Actor Award for the music video Engao Ngaojabi at the 2nd Manipur State Level Music Video Album Festival hosted by Manipur Film Development Corporation (MFDC). He won the Best Male Playback Singer for a song in the film Nangna Nokpa Yengningi in the 5th SSS MANIFA 2016.

== Filmography ==
Year	Film	Role	Director
2008	Ekhenglaktagi Red Rose	Supporting role	Romi Meitei
2010	Chanu	Malem	Bimol Phibou
2013	Director Producer	Himself	L. Prakash
2014	Thang-Gee Maya		Obit
2014	Sathiba Danger		Ajit Ningthouja
2014	Meerang Mahum		Ajit Ningthouja
2015	Nungshit Mapi	Thouna	Ajit Ningthouja
2015	Nangna Nokpa Yengningi	Amujao	Ajit Ningthouja
2016	Henna Nungaijei		Kepidas
2016	Konggol	Thanil	Ajit Ningthouja
2018	Soinairaba Thamoi	Paikhomba	Pilu H.
2018	Leichilda Pallaba Thaja	Malangba	Pilu H.
2022	Awaiba Mapu	Ibothoi	Khoibam Homeshwori
