= Rajarshi Bhagyachandra of Manipur =

- Poster (Painting Courtesy: RKCS)
- Directed by: Aribam Syam Sharma
- Written by: M. K. Binodini Devi & Aribam Syam Sharma (Research and script); Aribam Uttam Sharma (Narration script)
- Produced by: Films Division of India
- Cinematography: Irom Maipak
- Edited by: Ujjal Nandy
- Music by: G. Lalkanhai Sharma; Shri Ibomcha Singh; Sound: A. Shantimo Sharma
- Production company: Films Division of India
- Release date: 2007
- Running time: 56 minutes
- Country: India
- Language: English

Rajarshi Bhagyachandra of Manipur is a 2007 Manipuri documentary film directed by Aribam Syam Sharma. It was produced by Films Division of India. The film was selected in the non-feature section of the Indian Panorama at the 38th International Film Festival of India 2007.

The film was screened at the 2nd Manipur International Documentary, Short and Animation Film Festival, 2010. It was also among the selected special package of films under the title Colours of North East, organised by Films Division in November 2021 as a part of Azadi ka Amrit Mahotsav celebration.

The film traces Rajarshi Bhagyachandra's exploits and achievements.
