= Oinam Gautam Singh =

Indian film director

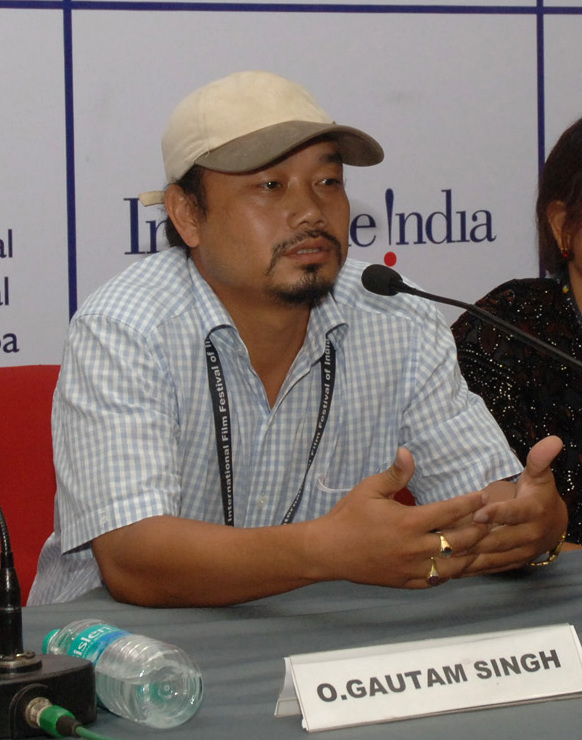
- O. Gautam addressing a press conference during 42nd IFFI 2011
- Born: 12 October 1977; Sagolband Mabudhou Mantri Leikai, Imphal West, Manipur
- Occupations: Director, Editor, Screenplay Writer
- Years active: 2002-present
- Spouse: Lenabati Phanjoubam
- Children: Ningthoungamba Oinam
- Parent(s): Oinam Leirenjao Singh; Oinam Ongbi Radhe Devi
- Awards: National Film Award for Best Feature Film in Manipuri (2011)

Oinam Gautam Singh (popularly known as O. Gautam) is an Indian film director and editor who works in Manipuri films. He started his career in Manipuri cinema as an editor and later took up direction since more than a decade. One of the successful filmmakers in Manipuri Cinema, he is the recipient of many awards, including a National Film Award for his 2011 movie Phijigee Mani. Gautam has worked under eminent film personalities like Aribam Syam Sharma and Oken Amakcham. He had been a Jury Member of Indian Panorama for 45th International Film Festival of India (IFFI) 2014.

== Career ==
Gautam started working as a chief assistant director under Oken Amakcham in the 2002 Lammei, the first video film to have a commercial screening at a theatre, and in the 2003 movie Cheina, a celluloid film. He set out to work independently as a director in films like Leichildagee Urok and Nangi Shaktam. His film Naoshum was among the feature films screened at the 1st Festival of Manipuri Cinema 2007, organised by Film Forum Manipur. Under Aribam Syam Sharma, he had worked in films Rajarshi Bhagyachandra of Manipur, Crossroads, Miraang, Leipaklei, Manipuri Pony and Dasha.

He had also tried hands on a musical film Laibakki Chandan. His directorial venture Nangdi Eigi Thawaini is produced by Kangla Films, Manipur under the aegis of MANIREDA. The movie focusses on viability of the use of renewable solar energy as a substitute for the commercial energy sources. Gautam's 2011 film Phijigee Mani earned him a National Film Award. His 2013 movie Beragee Bomb and its sequel Moreh Maru displayed his capability on successful direction of comedy genre films. His movies Naoshum and Manipur Express became hit films when it was released in theatres.

His 2015 film Pankhei, which is based on insurgency and various socio-political chaos in Manipur, is a woman centric movie with Sukanya Haorongbam playing the lead role. In 2019, he directed Pandam Amada which bagged several awards in the 13th Manipur State Film Festival 2020. It also participated in Tokyo Lift-Off Film Festival 2020, 18th International Dhaka Film Festival and 18th Third Eye Asian Film Festival, Mumbai.

== Accolades ==
Gautam's 2011 film Phijigee Mani won the National Film Award for Best Feature Film in Manipuri at the 59th National Film Awards. The citation for the National Award reads, "For a sensitive depiction of the complex displacements that are occurring today in the North Eastern states. The director shows in the most graceful manner the consequences of displaced socio-political priorities which dislodge the young and disturb traditional family moorings and the even more ancient tribal societal systems". Phijigee Mani also participated in Indian Panorama 2011. It was selected in the North East package and screened in IFFI 2014.

He earned an award when Pankhei bagged the Special Jury award in the Manipur State Film Awards 2016. He won the Best Screenplay and Best Direction awards for his work in the film Aruba Echel in the Manipur State Film Awards 2018. His 2019 film Pandam Amada won the Best Children Film, Best Feature Film and several other awards in the 13th Manipur State Film Awards 2020. He also won the Best Director award for the film.

== Filmography ==
Year	Title	Role	Studio (Production House)
2002	Lammei	Chief assistant director	Kangla Films, Manipur
2003	Cheina	Chief assistant director	Dashu Films
2003	Leichildagee Urok	Director, editor	Treasure Island
2004	Nangi Shaktam	Director, editor	Treasure Island
2005	Laibakkee Chandan	Director, editor	Leichal Films
2006	Radha-Rani	Director	Pilu Films
2007	Naoshum	Director	Sushima Films
2007	Rajarshi Bhagyachandra of Manipur	Assistant director	Films Division of India
2008	Ei Ngaode	Director	Peace Films
2008	Crossroads	Chief assistant director, editor	Aribam Syam Sharma Productions
2008	Keishamthong Thoibi	Director	Diana Films
2009	Uoo Thambal	Director	Seven Salai Films
2009	Khongthang-gi Makhol	Director, editor	Eastern Movies
2010	Nangdi Eigi Thawaini	Director, editor	Kangla Films, Manipur
2011	Phijigee Mani	Director, editor	Radha Govind Films
2011	Miraang	Chief assistant director, editor	Aribam Syam Sharma Productions
2012	Leipaklei	Chief assistant director, editor	Aribam Syam Sharma Productions
2012	Manipuri Pony	Assistant director, editor	Films Division of India
2012	Manipur Express	Director	Green Chillies
2013	Dasha	Chief assistant director, editor	Aribam Syam Sharma Productions
2013	Beragee Bomb	Director, editor	Chingkhurakpa Art
2014	Eidee Kadaida	Director, editor	Nilahari Films
2015	Pankhei	Director	Nongja Films
2016	Moreh Maru	Director	RT Motion Pictures
2016	Nanggee Shaktam Nungshiba Helli	Director	Green Chillies
2018	Aruba Echel	Director, screenplay	Khunaillon Films
2019	Pandam Amada	Director, editor	Takhel Films
2021	Nungshi Lottery Phaorehe	Director, screenplay	Mashu Maben Films
2022	Nongallamdaisida	Director, screenplay	NB Poireicha Films
Upcoming	Ahingsina Loidringei	Director	Seuti Films
