= Opinion polling for the next South Korean legislative election =

This page lists public opinion polls conducted for the next South Korean legislative election. For more information, visit the National Election Survey Deliberation Committee of Korea.

LOESS curve for the 2028 South Korean legislative election with a 14-day average

== 2026 ==
Fieldwork date	Sample size	Margin of error	Polling firm	DPK	PPP	RKP	RP	PP	BIP	SDP	Others	Und./ no ans.	Lead
28–30 Sep	1,000	±3.1	NBS (Note: Embrain Public, KStat Research, Korea Research, Hankook Research)	35	25	3	2	1	—N/a	—N/a	2	32	10
28–29 Sep	1,010	±3.1	Ace Research / Newsis	39.0	29.4	4.9	2.9	1.2	—N/a	—N/a	3.2	19.3	9.6
28–29 Sep	1,001	±3.1	KSOI	36.3	37.7	3.7	1.6	1.0	—N/a	—N/a	2.6	17.0	1.4
22–23 Sep	1,005	±3.1	Realmeter / EKN	38.7	39.4	4.0	2.9	1.4	—N/a	—N/a	3.3	10.2	0.7
21–22 Sep	1,001	±3.1	Embrain Public / KBS	35	28	3	2	1	—N/a	—N/a	2	29	7
19–21 Sep	2,007	±2.2	Jowon C&I / Straight News	40.3	37.3	4.2	1.8	0.6	—N/a	—N/a	2.1	13.7	3.0
15–20 Sep	1,592	±2.5	STI / Hankyoreh	44.2	27.5	5.9	4.1	1.2	—N/a	—N/a	3.4	13.9	16.7
18–19 Sep	1,003	±3.1	Flower Research	43.4	36.4	4.9	1.8	1.0	—N/a	—N/a	0.9	11.6	7.0
17–18 Sep	1,003	±3.1	Realmeter / EKN	40.2	38.5	5.2	1.9	0.9	—N/a	—N/a	2.4	11.0	1.7
15–17 Sep	1,002	±3.1	Gallup Korea	40	27	3	3	1	0.1	0.1	1	25	13
14–15 Sep	1,001	±3.1	KSOI	36.3	33.2	4.3	3.0	1.2	—N/a	—N/a	2.8	19.3	3.1
11–12 Sep	1,002	±3.1	Flower Research	40.1	36.3	4.5	2.4	1.1	—N/a	—N/a	1.3	14.2	3.8
10–11 Sep	1,003	±3.1	Realmeter / EKN	36.1	42.1	4.7	1.3	1.3	—N/a	—N/a	2.3	12.2	6.0
8–10 Sep	1,000	±3.1	Gallup Korea	38	29	2	3	2	—N/a	0.2	1	26	9
7–9 Sep	1,002	±3.1	NBS	39	25	3	1	1	—N/a	—N/a	1	30	14
4–5 Sep	1,002	±3.1	Flower Research	42.6	36.1	4.2	1.5	0.6	—N/a	—N/a	0.7	14.4	6.5
3–4 Sep	1,001	±3.1	Realmeter / EKN	41.8	37.6	4.5	2.3	1.3	—N/a	—N/a	2.1	10.5	4.2
1–3 Sep	1,001	±3.1	Gallup Korea	38	30	3	1	1	0.4	0.1	1	25	8
31 Aug–1 Sep	1,000	±3.1	KSOI	39.3	33.6	3.0	1.7	1.9	—N/a	—N/a	2.0	18.5	5.7
28–29 Aug	1,004	±3.1	Flower Research	45.9	29.5	3.7	2.7	1.3	—N/a	—N/a	1.0	15.9	16.4
27–28 Aug	1,006	±3.1	Realmeter / EKN	43.1	37.7	4.4	2.6	1.4	—N/a	—N/a	1.7	9.0	5.4
25–27 Aug	1,001	±3.1	Gallup Korea	39	25	4	3	1	0.3	—N/a	2	26	14
24–26 Aug	1,001	±3.1	NBS	41	20	2	2	1	—N/a	—N/a	2	31	21
21–22 Aug	1,007	±3.1	Flower Research	44.8	33.9	3.5	2.8	1.0	—N/a	—N/a	0.6	13.3	10.9
20–21 Aug	1,009	±3.1	Realmeter / EKN	41.9	37.6	3.9	2.0	2.3	—N/a	—N/a	2.5	9.7	4.3
18–20 Aug	1,004	±3.1	Gallup Korea	41	25	2	2	2	0.2	0.1	1	26	16
18–19 Aug	1,001	±3.1	KSOI	42.5	32.0	2.7	2.0	1.7	—N/a	—N/a	1.2	17.9	10.5
14–15 Aug	1,000	±3.1	Flower Research	48.2	30.8	2.6	2.1	1.2	—N/a	—N/a	0.8	14.4	17.4
13–14 Aug	1,004	±3.1	Realmeter / EKN	47.9	33.1	2.5	2.2	1.9	—N/a	—N/a	2.3	10.1	14.8
11-13 Aug	1,000	±3.1	Gallup Korea	41	25	2	3	1	0.5	0.1	1	28	16
10–12 Aug	1,001	±3.1	NBS	40	23	2	2	1	—N/a	—N/a	1	29	17
10–11 Aug	1,033	±3.0	Media Tomato / News Tomato	44.7	30.1	3.9	3.6	2.1	—N/a	—N/a	2.2	13.4	14.6
9–10 Aug	1,018	±3.1	Ace Research / Newsis	'45.4	24.9	4.0	3.0	1.4	—N/a	—N/a	3.3	18.0	20.5
8–10 Aug	2,001	±2.2	Jowon C&I / Straight News	46.4	37.3	1.8	1.7	0.7	—N/a	—N/a	1.5	10.7	9.1
7–8 Aug	1,002	±3.1	Flower Research	45.5	33.8	2.5	2.8	1.5	—N/a	—N/a	0.9	13.0	11.7
6–7 Aug	1,007	±3.1	Realmeter / EKN	44.6	37.6	2.9	2.9	1.5	—N/a	—N/a	1.7	9.0	7.0
3–4 Aug	1,037	±3.0	Media Tomato / News Tomato	46.2	31.0	3.1	2.1	2.0	—N/a	—N/a	3.2	12.3	15.2
3–4 Aug	1,002	±3.1	KSOI	41.1	30.6	3.0	2.5	1.7	—N/a	—N/a	3.2	17.9	10.5
31 Jul–1 Aug	1,001	±3.1	Flower Research	47.7	30.8	2.5	2.1	0.9	—N/a	—N/a	2.9	14.0	16.9
30–31 Jul	1,002	±3.1	Realmeter / EKN	45.1	37.7	2.0	2.4	0.9	—N/a	—N/a	2.3	9.5	7.4
27–29 Jul	1,000	±3.1	NBS	40	21	2	2	1	—N/a	—N/a	1	33	19
27–28 Jul	1,033	±3.0	Media Tomato / News Tomato	46.0	31.3	3.5	3.0	1.4	—N/a	—N/a	2.4	12.3	14.7
25–27 Jul	2,002	±2.2	Jowon C&I / Straight News	46.3	36.0	1.9	1.8	0.7	—N/a	—N/a	2.5	11.8	10.3
24–25 Jul	1,000	±3.1	Flower Research	47.0	34.6	1.6	2.5	0.9	—N/a	—N/a	0.8	12.6	12.4
23–24 Jul	1,001	±3.1	Realmeter / EKN	41.3	40.6	3.3	2.2	1.0	—N/a	—N/a	2.0	9.6	0.7
21–23 Jul	1,003	±3.1	Gallup Korea	44	23	2	2	1	0.4	0.1	1	27	21
20–21 Jul	1,036	±3.0	Media Tomato / News Tomato	46.6	29.0	3.7	2.9	1.5	—N/a	—N/a	3.1	13.3	17.6
20–21 Jul	1,000	±3.1	KSOI	42.9	30.6	1.9	3.3	1.2	—N/a	—N/a	2.5	17.7	12.3
17–18 Jul	1,004	±3.1	Flower Research	49.6	32.3	1.8	2.0	1.0	—N/a	—N/a	1.1	12.3	17.3
15–16 Jul	1,005	±3.1	Realmeter / EKN	43.1	40.0	3.1	2.7	1.3	—N/a	—N/a	1.2	8.5	3.1
14–16 Jul	1,003	±3.1	Gallup Korea	40	26	2	2	1	0.1	0.2	1	28	14
13–15 Jul	1,000	±3.1	NBS	38	22	2	3	2	—N/a	—N/a	2	32	16
11–13 Jul	2,019	±2.2	Jowon C&I / Straight News	44.0	37.2	2.2	2.6	0.7	—N/a	—N/a	1.9	11.4	6.8
10–11 Jul	1,004	±3.1	Flower Research	48.1	31.8	2.4	2.3	0.9	—N/a	—N/a	2.1	12.4	16.3
9–10 Jul	1,002	±3.1	Realmeter / EKN	44.8	38.1	2.7	3.7	0.6	—N/a	—N/a	1.8	8.2	6.7
7–9 Jul	1,002	±3.1	Gallup Korea	42	24	3	3	1	1	0.1	1	26	18
6–7 Jul	1,037	±3.0	Media Tomato / News Tomato	41.9	36.0	3.5	2.5	1.5	—N/a	—N/a	2.6	12.0	5.9
6–7 Jul	1,002	±3.1	KSOI	45.0	29.1	2.7	1.6	1.9	—N/a	—N/a	2.3	17.5	15.9
3–4 Jul	1,006	±3.1	Flower Research	48.7	31.3	3.3	2.0	1.3	—N/a	—N/a	1.3	12.2	17.4
2–3 Jul	1,008	±3.1	Realmeter / EKN	43.0	40.3	1.9	3.0	1.6	—N/a	—N/a	3.7	6.5	2.7
30 Jun–2 Jul	1,005	±3.1	Gallup Korea	41	26	2	2	1	1	—N/a	2	25	15
29 Jun–1 Jul	1,000	±3.1	NBS	42	20	2	2	1	—N/a	—N/a	1	29	22
29-30 Jun	1,000	±3.1	KIR / Cheonjiilbo	41.8	38.3	2.4	2.6	1.4	—N/a	—N/a	3.2	10.3	3.5
27–29 Jun	2,000	±2.2	Jowon C&I / Straight News	43.4	38.7	2.1	2.5	1.2	—N/a	—N/a	2.2	9.8	4.7
25–26 Jun	1,002	±3.1	Realmeter / EKN	41.0	42.0	3.7	2.8	1.5	—N/a	—N/a	2.1	6.9	1.0
23–25 Jun	1,000	±3.1	Gallup Korea	41	27	2	4	1	0.3	—N/a	1	23	14
22–23 Jun	1,035	±3.0	Media Tomato / News Tomato	38.1	39.4	4.2	2.9	2.2	—N/a	—N/a	2,2	11.0	1.3
22-23 Jun	1,004	±3.1	KIR / Cheonjiilbo	41.4	41.4	3.1	2.4	0.8	—N/a	—N/a	2.6	8.3	Tie
22–23 Jun	1,005	±3.1	KSOI	39.6	37.3	1.6	2.7	1.9	—N/a	—N/a	1.9	15.1	2.3
20–22 Jun	1,006	±3.1	Hangil Research / Kukinews	38.0	27.4	2.7	2.7	2.1	—N/a	—N/a	3.4	23.6	10.6
18–19 Jun	1,001	±3.1	Realmeter / EKN	40.1	42.3	2.9	3.4	1.7	—N/a	—N/a	1.9	7.7	2.2
15-16 Jun	1,029	±3.1	KIR / Cheonjiilbo	41.3	39.4	3.4	3.6	0.9	—N/a	—N/a	1.6	9.7	1.9
13–15 Jun	2,001	±2.2	Jowon C&I / Straight News	40.0	41.6	3.2	2.1	1.2	—N/a	—N/a	2.3	9.7	1.6
12–13 Jun	1,003	±3.1	Flower Research	47.7	34.4	3.2	2.0	1.5	—N/a	—N/a	0.4	10.7	13.3
11–12 Jun	1,002	±3.1	Realmeter / EKN	38.0	44.3	3.7	2.8	1.2	—N/a	—N/a	2.2	7.8	6.3
9–11 Jun	1,002	±3.1	Gallup Korea	41	29	2	2	2	0.5	0.2	2	21	12
8–10 Jun	1,001	±3.1	NBS	41	25	2	3	2	—N/a	—N/a	2	24	16
8–9 Jun	1,036	±3.0	Media Tomato / News Tomato	42.9	34.7	3.5	2.7	2.0	—N/a	—N/a	3.7	10.3	8.2
8-9 Jun	1,001	±3.1	KIR / Cheonjiilbo	44.3	37.6	2.8	2.6	0.9	—N/a	—N/a	2.2	9.5	6.7
8–9 Jun	1,001	±3.1	KSOI	38.6	38.1	1.6	3.9	1.0	—N/a	—N/a	2.6	14.1	0.5
6–8 Jun	2,000	±2.2	Jowon C&I / Straight News	40.4	41.6	2.1	1.8	1.5	—N/a	—N/a	3.0	9.6	1.2
5–6 Jun	1,004	±3.1	Flower Research	50.3	32.3	2.1	2.1	1.3	—N/a	—N/a	1.6	10.3	18.0
4–5 Jun	1,004	±3.1	Realmeter / EKN	41.8	41.1	2.8	2.5	1.1	—N/a	—N/a	3.2	7.6	0.7
1-2 Jun	1,002	±3.1	KIR / Cheonjiilbo	45.8	34.3	3.6	3.2	2.4	—N/a	—N/a	2.0	8.7	11.5
26–27 May	1,001	±3.1	KSOI	43.3	31.6	2.1	3.2	1.7	—N/a	—N/a	2.1	16.1	11.7
25 May	1,000	±3.1	KIR / Cheonjiilbo	46.6	32.6	3.5	2.9	2.1	—N/a	—N/a	3.8	8.5	14.0
23–25 May	2,001	±2.2	Jowon C&I / Straight News	44.6	36.7	2.8	3.2	1.7	—N/a	—N/a	2.8	8.2	7.9
22–23 May	1,003	±3.1	Flower Research	54.8	25.0	1.4	3.0	1.7	—N/a	—N/a	1.1	13.0	29.8
21–22 May	1,004	±3.1	Realmeter / EKN	47.5	33.3	3.4	3.2	2.3	—N/a	—N/a	2.5	7.6	14.2
19–21 May	1,002	±3.1	Gallup Korea	45	22	2	3	1	0.1	—N/a	1	26	23
18–20 May	1,001	±3.1	NBS	45	20	2	2	2	—N/a	—N/a	3	26	25
18–19 May	1,039	±3.0	Media Tomato / News Tomato	44.3	30.3	4.3	3.3	2.1	—N/a	—N/a	3.7	12.0	14.0
18-19 May	1,000	±3.1	KIR / Cheonjiilbo	45.5	32.2	3.0	3.3	1.8	—N/a	—N/a	3.8	10.2	13.3
16–18 May	2,012	±2.2	Jowon C&I / Straight News	46.8	35.1	2.3	2.1	1.8	—N/a	—N/a	2.5	9.5	11.7
15–16 May	1,001	±3.1	Flower Research	52.9	27.9	2.0	2.6	1.2	—N/a	—N/a	1.0	12.3	25.0
14–15 May	1,003	±3.1	Realmeter / EKN	45.8	33.5	3.8	3.2	1.8	—N/a	—N/a	3.0	8.9	12.3
12–14 May	1,011	±3.1	Gallup Korea	45	23	2	4	1	—N/a	0.1	1	24	22
11-12 May	1,004	±3.1	KIR / Cheonjiilbo	44.0	32.8	2.6	3.5	0.9	—N/a	—N/a	4.8	11.5	11.2
11–12 May	1,001	±3.1	KSOI	46.5	28.0	2.4	3.2	1.2	—N/a	—N/a	3.5	15.2	18.5
9–11 May	2,000	±2.2	Jowon C&I / Straight News	48.2	33.5	2.4	3.0	1.4	—N/a	—N/a	2.7	8.7	14.7
6–10 May	1,701	±2.4	STI / Hankyoreh	48.9	23.8	4.2	6.5	1.6	—N/a	—N/a	3.7	11.1	25.1
8–9 May	1,000	±3.1	Flower Research	55.9	24.5	1.4	1.6	0.7	—N/a	—N/a	1.4	14.5	31.4
7–8 May	1,006	±3.1	Realmeter / EKN	48.7	30.9	3.2	3.5	2.2	—N/a	—N/a	3.2	9.7	17.8
4–6 May	1,001	±3.1	NBS	46	18	3	2	1	—N/a	—N/a	2	29	28
4–5 May	1,038	±3.0	Media Tomato / News Tomato	46.4	29.8	4.3	3.5	3.1	—N/a	—N/a	2.9	10.1	16.6
4 May	1,010	±3.1	KIR / Cheonjiilbo	47.1	32.3	2.5	2.6	1.4	—N/a	—N/a	3.1	10.9	14.8
2–4 May	2,002	±2.2	Jowon C&I / Straight News	50.8	32.1	2.2	2.6	1.0	—N/a	—N/a	2.9	8.4	18.7
1–2 May	1,007	±3.1	Flower Research	58.7	21.6	1.7	3.2	0.8	—N/a	—N/a	1.0	13.0	37.1
29–30 Apr	1,006	±3.1	Realmeter / EKN	48.6	31.6	4.0	2.6	2.2	—N/a	—N/a	2.8	9.1	17.0
28–30 Apr	1,002	±3.1	Gallup Korea	46	21	2	2	1	0.1	0.1	1	27	25
27–28 Apr	1,005	±3.1	KIR / Cheonjiilbo	47.7	30.3	2.8	2.4	1.6	—N/a	—N/a	4.2	11.1	17.4
24–25 Apr	1,003	±3.1	Flower Research	54.5	23.7	2.3	3.1	1.1	—N/a	—N/a	1.0	14.3	30.8
23–24 Apr	1,006	±3.1	Realmeter / EKN	51.3	30.7	2.5	3.6	1.3	—N/a	—N/a	3.3	8.0	20.6
21–23 Apr	1,001	±3.1	Gallup Korea	48	20	2	2	1	0.3	—N/a	1	26	28
20–22 Apr	1,005	±3.1	NBS	48	15	2	2	2	—N/a	—N/a	2	29	33
20–21 Apr	1,008	±3.1	KIR / Cheonjiilbo	48.3	30.3	2.7	3.3	1.2	—N/a	—N/a	3.7	10.5	18.0
20–21 Apr	1,036	±3.0	Media Tomato / News Tomato	49.2	30.2	2.8	2.9	1.5	—N/a	—N/a	3.3	10.0	19.0
20–21 Apr	1,004	±3.1	KSOI	46.7	25.9	2.7	4.1	2.5	—N/a	—N/a	3.4	14.7	20.8
18–20 Apr	2,001	±2.2	Jowon C&I / Straight News	49.6	33.3	1.8	2.6	1.3	—N/a	—N/a	2.5	8.9	16.3
17–18 Apr	1,003	±3.1	Flower Research	55.8	23.0	1.6	2.4	0.9	—N/a	—N/a	1.5	14.9	32.8
16–17 Apr	1,011	±3.1	Realmeter / EKN	50.5	31.4	2.7	2.5	1.7	—N/a	—N/a	2.9	8.3	19.1
14–16 Apr	1,000	±3.1	Gallup Korea	48	19	2	2	2	0.1	0.1	1	26	29
13–14 Apr	1,001	±3.1	KIR / Cheonjiilbo	50.9	28.5	1.6	3.7	1.2	—N/a	—N/a	4.5	9.7	22.4
12-13 Apr	1,001	±3.1	Metavoice / JTBC	46	21	2	2	1	0	1	3	23	25
10–11 Apr	1,004	±3.1	Flower Research	58.6	23.5	2.0	2.7	1.0	—N/a	—N/a	1.0	11.3	35.1
9–10 Apr	1,002	±3.1	Realmeter / EKN	50.6	30.0	3.3	2.8	2.0	—N/a	—N/a	3.3	8.0	20.6
7–9 Apr	1,002	±3.1	Gallup Korea	48	20	1	3	1	0.2	0.3	1	25	28
6–8 Apr	1,000	±3.1	NBS	47	18	2	3	1	—N/a	—N/a	2	27	29
6–7 Apr	1,002	±3.1	KSOI	50.6	23.2	2.2	2.1	2.0	—N/a	—N/a	3.5	16.3	27.4
6–7 Apr	1,035	±3.0	Media Tomato / News Tomato	55.2	24.0	2.3	3.4	1.6	—N/a	—N/a	2.6	11.1	31.2
6–7 Apr	1,004	±3.1	KIR / Cheonjiilbo	50.5	28.7	2.7	2.4	1.8	—N/a	—N/a	4.0	10.1	21.8
4–6 Apr	2,000	±2.2	Jowon C&I / Straight News	54.3	29.4	2.1	2.0	1.2	—N/a	—N/a	1.7	9.3	24.9
3–4 Apr	1,001	±3.1	Flower Research	55.0	24.2	2.5	2.2	0.5	—N/a	—N/a	1.6	14.1	30.8
2–3 Apr	1,005	±3.1	Realmeter / EKN	49.9	31.3	2.8	2.3	1.5	—N/a	—N/a	3.9	8.2	18.6
31 Mar–2 Apr	1,001	±3.1	Gallup Korea	48	18	1	2	1	—N/a	0.1	1	28	30
30–31 Mar	1,005	±3.1	KIR / Cheonjiilbo	48.6	29.3	1.6	3.0	1.7	—N/a	—N/a	4.0	11.8	19.3
30–31 Mar	1,000	±3.1	Researchview	48.8	27.4	3.4	1.5	3.9	0.6	0.3	5.1	9.2	21.4
27–28 Mar	1,000	±3.1	Flower Research	57.2	22.2	2.2	1.6	0.8	—N/a	—N/a	1.3	14.8	35.0
26–27 Mar	1,006	±3.1	Realmeter / EKN	51.1	30.6	1.6	2.7	1.5	—N/a	—N/a	2.4	10.2	20.5
24–26 Mar	1,000	±3.1	Gallup Korea	46	19	2	3	1	0.1	0.3	1	27	27
23–25 Mar	1,002	±3.1	NBS	46	18	2	2	1	—N/a	—N/a	2	30	28
23–24 Mar	1,011	±3.1	KIR / Cheonjiilbo	48.4	32.6	2.5	2.2	1.2	—N/a	—N/a	3.6	9.4	15.8
23–24 Mar	1,035	±3.0	Media Tomato / News Tomato	48.5	33.3	3.3	2.3	1.5	—N/a	—N/a	2.3	8.8	15.2
23–24 Mar	1,003	±3.1	KSOI	46.8	27.1	2.7	3.7	2.1	—N/a	—N/a	3.1	14.5	19.7
21–23 Mar	2,000	±2.2	Jowon C&I / Straight News	50.6	33.3	2.0	2.2	0.6	—N/a	—N/a	1.5	9.9	17.3
20–21 Mar	1,004	±3.1	Flower Research	54.3	24.6	2.6	2.5	1.0	—N/a	—N/a	1.1	13.9	29.7
19–20 Mar	1,005	±3.1	Realmeter / EKN	53.0	28.1	3.0	4.0	0.8	—N/a	—N/a	1.9	9.1	24.9
17–19 Mar	1,004	±3.1	Gallup Korea	46	20	3	2	1	0.2	—N/a	1	27	26
16–17 Mar	1,007	±3.1	KIR / Cheonjiilbo	47.6	31.9	3.1	1.6	0.8	—N/a	—N/a	3.0	11.9	15.7
13–14 Mar	1,001	±3.1	Flower Research	52.3	26.6	1.8	3.1	0.6	—N/a	—N/a	0.8	14.9	25.7
12–13 Mar	1,005	±3.1	Realmeter / EKN	50.5	31.9	2.6	2.8	1.4	—N/a	—N/a	1.8	9.0	18.6
10–12 Mar	1,002	±3.1	Gallup Korea	47	20	2	1	1	0.3	—N/a	0	28	27
9–11 Mar	1,002	±3.1	NBS	43	17	3	2	1	—N/a	—N/a	1	33	26
9–10 Mar	1,001	±3.1	KIR / Cheonjiilbo	42.8	33.6	2.9	3.0	1.4	—N/a	—N/a	2.6	13.8	9.2
9–10 Mar	1,036	±3.0	Media Tomato / News Tomato	47.5	29.9	2.9	2.3	1.7	—N/a	—N/a	2.4	13.3	17.6
9–10 Mar	1,000	±3.1	KSOI	44.4	28.4	3.7	2.6	2.3	—N/a	—N/a	3.6	15.0	16.0
7–9 Mar	2,003	±2.2	Jowon C&I / Straight News	47.4	36.3	2.2	2.3	0.6	—N/a	—N/a	1.6	9.6	11.1
6–7 Mar	1,004	±3.1	Flower Research	56.3	23.0	2.0	2.2	0.8	—N/a	—N/a	1.0	14.6	33.3
5–6 Mar	1,001	±3.1	Realmeter / EKN	48.1	32.4	2.8	2.6	1.3	—N/a	—N/a	2.3	10.4	15.7
3–5 Mar	1,001	±3.1	Gallup Korea	46	21	3	2	1	1	—N/a	1	26	25
2–3 Mar	1,001	±3.1	KIR / Cheonjiilbo	48.1	31.9	2.7	2.3	1.0	—N/a	—N/a	3.8	10.1	16.2
1–3 Mar	1,000	±3.1	Researchview	44.9	32.6	3.6	3.2	1.6	1.1	0.9	3.6	8.6	12.3
1–2 Mar	1,004	±3.1	Ace Research / Newsis	45.9	26.4	4.0	4.4	0.8	—N/a	—N/a	1.9	16.6	19.5
27–28 Feb	1,004	±3.1	Flower Research	58.5	23.7	2.5	1.8	0.5	—N/a	—N/a	0.4	12.6	34.8
26–27 Feb	1,002	±3.1	Realmeter / EKN	47.1	33.8	3.3	2.2	1.1	—N/a	—N/a	2.4	10.0	13.3
24–26 Feb	1,000	±3.1	Gallup Korea	43	22	3	2	1	0.5	0.2	1	28	21
23–25 Feb	1,002	±3.1	NBS	45	17	4	3	1	—N/a	—N/a	3	27	28
23–24 Feb	1,002	±3.1	KIR / Cheonjiilbo	47.6	33.3	2.7	2.2	0.8	—N/a	—N/a	2.1	11.4	14.3
23–24 Feb	1,034	±3.0	Media Tomato / News Tomato	48.1	28.1	3.8	2.7	2.1	—N/a	—N/a	3.5	11.7	20.0
23–24 Feb	1,005	±3.1	KSOI	44.5	28.1	3.1	3.1	1.5	—N/a	—N/a	3.0	16.8	16.4
21–23 Feb	2,001	±2.2	Jowon C&I / Straight News	47.5	35.7	1.8	2.8	0.6	—N/a	—N/a	2.0	9.5	11.8
20–21 Feb	1,005	±3.1	Flower Research	55.5	25.1	3.7	1.7	1.4	—N/a	—N/a	1.2	11.3	30.4
19–20 Feb	1,000	±3.1	Realmeter / EKN	48.6	32.6	3.3	2.4	1.4	—N/a	—N/a	2.2	9.4	16.0
12–14 Feb	1,004	±3.1	Ipsos / SBS	46	23	2	3	1	0	0	1	23	23
12–13 Feb	1,009	±3.1	Realmeter / EKN	44.8	36.1	3.8	2.7	1.5	—N/a	—N/a	2.0	9.2	8.7
11–13 Feb	1,000	±3.1	Korea Research / MBC	46	23	3	4	2	0	0	2	20	23
10–12 Feb	1,012	±3.1	Kstat / KBS	44	21	4	4	1	—N/a	—N/a	1	26	23
10–12 Feb	1,003	±3.1	Gallup Korea	44	22	2	2	1	1	0.1	1	27	22
9–10 Feb	1,036	±3.0	Media Tomato / News Tomato	45.3	31.9	4.7	3.3	1.5	—N/a	—N/a	2.3	10.9	13.4
9–10 Feb	1,006	±3.1	KIR / Cheonjiilbo	46.1	32.5	3.9	2.8	0.8	—N/a	—N/a	2.7	11.2	13.6
9–10 Feb	1,004	±3.1	KSOI	46.1	28.0	2.8	4.3	1.7	—N/a	—N/a	2.1	15.0	18.1
7–9 Feb	2,001	±2.2	Jowon C&I / Straight News	46.9	37.7	2.2	1.4	1.0	—N/a	—N/a	1.3	9.4	9.2
7–9 Feb	1,015	±3.1	Hangil Research / Kukinews	38.9	26.9	4.0	3.4	1.9	—N/a	—N/a	4.1	20.8	12.0
6–7 Feb	1,002	±3.1	Flower Research	53.7	28.6	2.5	1.1	1.1	—N/a	—N/a	0.9	12.0	25.1
5–6 Feb	1,005	±3.1	Realmeter / EKN	47.6	34.9	2.6	3.3	1.3	—N/a	—N/a	1.5	8.9	12.7
3–5 Feb	1,001	±3.1	Gallup Korea	41	25	3	2	1	0.1	0.3	1	26	16
2–4 Feb	1,003	±3.1	NBS	41	22	3	3	1	—N/a	—N/a	2	29	19
2–3 Feb	1,003	±3.1	KIR / Cheonjiilbo	45.1	35.6	2.3	4.4	1.3	—N/a	—N/a	2.1	9.1	9.5
30–31 Jan	1,006	±3.1	Flower Research	53.6	27.1	2.5	3.1	0.4	—N/a	—N/a	1.0	12.4	26.5
27–29 Jan	1,001	±3.1	Gallup Korea	44	25	2	2	1	0.2	0.2	1	24	19
27–28 Jan	1,035	±3.0	Media Tomato / News Tomato	43.9	33.8	3.9	2.8	1.2	—N/a	—N/a	2.6	11.9	10.1
26–27 Jan	1,001	±3.1	KIR / Cheonjiilbo	43.1	37.2	3.0	3.1	1.1	—N/a	—N/a	2.7	9.9	5.9
24–26 Jan	2,002	±2.2	Jowon C&I / Straight News	45.3	36.8	2.6	2.2	1.2	—N/a	—N/a	2.2	9.6	8.5
23–24 Jan	1,003	±3.1	Flower Research	53.6	26.7	3.3	1.7	1.4	—N/a	—N/a	1.3	12.1	26.9
22–23 Jan	1,000	±3.1	Realmeter / EKN	42.7	39.5	3.2	3.1	1.5	—N/a	—N/a	1.2	8.9	3.2
20–22 Jan	1,000	±3.1	Gallup Korea	43	22	3	2	1	0.2	—N/a	2	27	21
19–21 Jan	1,001	±3.1	NBS	40	20	3	3	1	—N/a	—N/a	2	32	20
19–20 Jan	1,004	±3.1	KSOI	40.9	33.0	1.9	3.9	1.1	—N/a	—N/a	2.0	17.3	7.9
16–17 Jan	1,004	±3.1	Flower Research	54.9	26.3	2.3	2.7	0.7	—N/a	—N/a	1.0	12.1	28.6
15–16 Jan	1,004	±3.1	Realmeter / EKN	42.5	37.0	2.5	3.3	1.7	—N/a	—N/a	1.6	11.5	5.5
13–15 Jan	1,000	±3.1	Gallup Korea	41	24	4	2	1	—N/a	—N/a	2	26	17
12–13 Jan	1,037	±3.0	Media Tomato / News Tomato	48.6	28.7	3.6	3.1	1.2	—N/a	—N/a	2.3	12.3	19.9
12–13 Jan	1,011	±3.1	KIR / Cheonjiilbo	45.7	36.2	2.6	3.0	0.6	—N/a	—N/a	3.0	8.9	9.5
10–12 Jan	2,001	±2.2	Jowon C&I / Straight News	45.1	36.9	2.3	2.6	1.0	—N/a	—N/a	1.5	10.5	8.2
10–12 Jan	1,061	±3.0	Hangil Research / Kukinews	40.2	25.0	4.1	3.4	1.3	—N/a	—N/a	4.8	21.4	15.2
9–10 Jan	1,004	±3.1	Flower Research	53.3	27.6	2.6	2.5	0.9	—N/a	—N/a	1.2	12.0	26.7
8–9 Jan	1,006	±3.1	Realmeter / EKN	47.8	33.5	2.6	4.3	1.6	—N/a	—N/a	1.7	8.5	14.3
6–8 Jan	1,000	±3.1	Gallup Korea	45	26	3	3	1	0.1	0.2	1	21	19
5–7 Jan	1,005	±3.1	NBS	39	23	3	3	1	—N/a	—N/a	1	30	16
5–6 Jan	1,004	±3.1	KIR / Cheonjiilbo	45.7	34.1	2.9	3.8	1.2	—N/a	—N/a	2.3	10.0	11.6
5–6 Jan	1,003	±3.1	KSOI	43.3	33.0	1.8	3.2	1.8	—N/a	—N/a	2.3	14.6	10.3
2–3 Jan	1,005	±3.1	Flower Research	56.6	24.1	2.3	2.2	0.8	—N/a	—N/a	0.9	13.1	32.5
31 Dec–2 Jan	1,000	±3.1	Realmeter / EKN	45.7	35.5	3.0	3.7	1.4	—N/a	—N/a	1.4	9.3	10.2

== 2025 ==
Fieldwork date	Sample size	Margin of error	Polling firm	DPK	PPP	RKP	RP	PP	NFP	BIP	SDP	Others	Und./ no ans.	Lead
30–31 Dec	1,002	±3.1	Realmeter / Ohmynews	47.8	35.5	2.4	4.0	1.6	—N/a	—N/a	—N/a	1.6	7.1	12.3
29–31 Dec	1,022	±3.1	Kstat / KBS	42	24	4	3	2	—N/a	—N/a	—N/a	2	23	18
29–30 Dec	1,007	±3.1	KIR / Cheonjiilbo	43.5	33.6	2.7	2.3	1.7	—N/a	—N/a	—N/a	3.2	13.0	9.9
29–30 Dec	1,033	±3.0	Media Tomato / News Tomato	42.0	23.7	4.7	5.1	1.7	—N/a	—N/a	—N/a	4.2	18.8	18.3
28–30 Dec	1,008	±3.1	Korea Research / MBC	46	23	4	4	1	—N/a	1	0	2	20	23
28–30 Dec	1,002	±3.1	Ace Research / Newsis	41.5	27.7	4.0	3.2	2.1	—N/a	—N/a	—N/a	3.0	18.5	13.8
28–29 Dec	1,005	±3.1	Metavoice / JTBC	44	27	3	4	2	—N/a	0	0	0	21	17
27–29 Dec	2,005	±2.2	Jowon C&I / Straight News	45.5	36.3	2.2	2.4	0.9	—N/a	—N/a	—N/a	1.9	10.7	9.2
27–29 Dec	1,023	±3.1	Hangil Research / Kukinews	39.9	24.3	3.5	4.4	1.8	—N/a	—N/a	—N/a	3.9	22.2	15.6
27–28 Dec	1,003	±3.1	Embrain Public / News1	39	24	2	2	1	—N/a	—N/a	—N/a	1	31	15
26–28 Dec	1,004	±3.1	Research&Research / Dong-A Ilbo	45.0	25.7	3.7	3.0	2.2	—N/a	0.2	0.2	2.4	17.6	19.3
26–27 Dec	1,010	±3.1	Gallup Korea / Kyunghyang	41	24	3	4	1	—N/a	0.1	—N/a	1	26	17
24–26 Dec	1,004	±3.1	Realmeter / EKN	44.5	35.7	3.1	3.8	1.7	—N/a	—N/a	—N/a	2.1	9.0	8.8
22–24 Dec	1,003	±3.1	NBS	41	20	3	4	0	—N/a	—N/a	—N/a	1	30	21
22–23 Dec	1,001	±3.1	KSOI	39.5	34.1	1.9	3.5	1.0	—N/a	—N/a	—N/a	1.6	18.3	5.4
20–21 Dec	1,001	±3.1	KIR / Cheonjiilbo	43.7	36.9	4.0	2.6	0.9	—N/a	—N/a	—N/a	2.2	9.7	6.8
17–21 Dec	2,020	±3.1	STI / Hankyoreh	48.2	27.6	4.6	5.9	0.6	—N/a	—N/a	—N/a	2.4	10.7	20.6
19–20 Dec	1,000	±3.1	EveryResearch / Medialocal	40.9	38.3	2.0	3.7	1.0	—N/a	—N/a	—N/a	4.0	10.2	2.6
19–20 Dec	1,004	±3.1	Flower Research	53.2	26.2	2.7	3.5	0.7	—N/a	—N/a	—N/a	0.7	13.1	27.0
18–19 Dec	1,007	±3.1	Realmeter / EKN	44.1	37.2	3.6	3.0	1.6	—N/a	—N/a	—N/a	1.7	8.7	6.9
16–18 Dec	1,001	±3.1	Gallup Korea	40	26	3	4	1	—N/a	0.3	0.1	1	26	14
15–16 Dec	1,034	±3.0	Media Tomato / News Tomato	45.1	31.9	3.6	3.2	1.3	—N/a	—N/a	—N/a	1.9	12.9	13.2
13–15 Dec	2,001	±2.2	Jowon C&I / Straight News	43.1	38.8	2.3	1.6	1.2	—N/a	—N/a	—N/a	2.1	10.8	4.3
13–14 Dec	1,010	±3.1	KIR / Cheonjiilbo	42.8	36.8	3.5	4.1	0.6	—N/a	—N/a	—N/a	1.9	10.3	6.0
12–13 Dec	1,006	±3.1	Flower Research	54.4	26.7	2.5	3.0	0.8	—N/a	—N/a	—N/a	0.7	11.9	27.7
11–12 Dec	1,010	±3.1	Realmeter / EKN	45.8	34.6	3.4	3.4	1.3	—N/a	—N/a	—N/a	1.4	10.1	11.2
9–11 Dec	1,000	±3.1	Gallup Korea	40	26	3	4	1	—N/a	0.4	0.1	1	26	14
8–10 Dec	1,000	±3.1	NBS	44	20	4	3	1	—N/a	—N/a	—N/a	2	25	24
8–9 Dec	1,004	±3.1	KSOI	44.9	31.1	2.2	2.5	1.1	—N/a	—N/a	—N/a	2.0	16.2	13.8
6–7 Dec	1,000	±3.1	KIR / Cheonjiilbo	43.9	37.0	2.6	2.5	1.2	—N/a	—N/a	—N/a	2.4	10.4	6.9
5–6 Dec	1,000	±3.1	EveryResearch / Medialocal	41.4	37.8	2.6	3.1	1.7	—N/a	—N/a	—N/a	3.6	9.8	3.6
5–6 Dec	1,002	±3.1	Flower Research	57.7	25.6	2.6	2.0	0.8	—N/a	—N/a	—N/a	0.6	10.8	32.1
4–5 Dec	1,003	±3.1	Gallup Korea / The Kukmin Daily	41	27	5	3	1	—N/a	0	0	1	22	14
4–5 Dec	1,008	±3.1	Realmeter / EKN	44.2	37.0	2.6	3.8	1.4	—N/a	—N/a	—N/a	2.3	8.6	7.2
2–4 Dec	1,000	±3.1	Gallup Korea	43	24	3	2	1	—N/a	1	0.3	1	24	19
30 Nov–1 Dec	1,010	±3.1	Kstat / MBC	45	25	2	3	1	—N/a	—N/a	—N/a	2	21	20
29 Nov–1 Dec	2,005	±2.2	Jowon C&I / Straight News	43.5	39.1	2.2	2.1	0.9	—N/a	—N/a	—N/a	2.0	10.2	4.4
29–30 Nov	1,000	±3.1	KIR / Cheonjiilbo	40.6	38.1	3.5	3.0	0.5	—N/a	—N/a	—N/a	1.9	12.4	2.5
28–30 Nov	1,000	±3.1	Researchview	42.3	32.8	4.5	4.6	0.7	1.4	0.5	0.6	2.3	10.4	9.5
28–29 Nov	1,008	±3.1	Signal and Pulse / Voice of Seoul	46.4	34.9	2.0	3.5	0.7	—N/a	—N/a	—N/a	1.6	10.8	11.5
28–29 Nov	1,002	±3.1	Flower Research	56.2	24.5	2.8	2.8	1.0	—N/a	—N/a	—N/a	0.8	11.8	31.7
28–29 Nov	1,002	±3.1	Gallup Korea / JoongAng	42	26	2	4	1	—N/a	0	0	1	23	16
27–28 Nov	1,012	±3.1	Realmeter / EKN	45.6	37.4	3.1	3.5	1.4	—N/a	—N/a	—N/a	1.8	7.3	8.2
25–27 Nov	1,000	±3.1	Gallup Korea	42	24	3	3	1	—N/a	0.2	0.1	1	26	18
24–26 Nov	1,003	±3.1	NBS	39	22	3	2	2	—N/a	—N/a	—N/a	1	32	17
24–25 Nov	1,008	±3.1	KSOI	45.5	29.4	1.9	2.4	1.9	—N/a	—N/a	—N/a	2.7	16.1	16.1
22–23 Nov	1,000	±3.1	EveryResearch / Medialocal	40.4	36.4	3.0	3.1	1.3	—N/a	—N/a	—N/a	4.1	11.8	4.0
22–23 Nov	1,003	±3.1	KIR / Cheonjiilbo	42.1	38.0	2.2	3.5	1.2	—N/a	—N/a	—N/a	2.9	10.1	4.1
21–22 Nov	1,008	±3.1	Flower Research	54.6	29.0	1.7	2.0	0.8	—N/a	—N/a	—N/a	0.7	11.3	25.6
20–21 Nov	1,004	±3.1	Realmeter / EKN	47.5	34.8	2.9	3.8	1.1	—N/a	—N/a	—N/a	1.8	8.0	12.7
18–20 Nov	1,000	±3.1	Gallup Korea	43	24	3	3	1	—N/a	0.2	—N/a	1	26	19
17–18 Nov	1,037	±3.0	Media Tomato / News Tomato	43.2	35.9	2.3	2.8	1.9	—N/a	—N/a	—N/a	1.8	12.0	7.3
15–17 Nov	2,003	±2.2	Jowon C&I / Straight News	42.2	39.6	2.1	2.3	1.1	—N/a	—N/a	—N/a	1.6	11.1	2.6
15–16 Nov	1,005	±3.1	KIR / Cheonjiilbo	38.3	38.2	3.1	4.1	2.0	—N/a	—N/a	—N/a	2.6	11.7	0.1
14–15 Nov	1,006	±3.1	Flower Research	53.7	25.2	2.6	3.6	0.9	—N/a	—N/a	—N/a	1.3	12.7	28.5
13–14 Nov	1,006	±3.1	Realmeter / EKN	46.7	34.2	3.2	3.1	1.0	—N/a	—N/a	—N/a	2.8	9.1	12.5
11–13 Nov	1,003	±3.1	Gallup Korea	42	24	2	3	1	—N/a	0.2	0.2	0	27	18
10–12 Nov	1,004	±3.1	NBS	42	21	4	3	1	—N/a	—N/a	—N/a	2	27	21
10–11 Nov	1,002	±3.1	KSOI	41.6	32.4	3.1	3.9	0.9	—N/a	—N/a	—N/a	2.3	15.8	9.2
8–10 Nov	1,009	±3.1	Hangil Research / Kukinews	38.7	26.0	3.5	3.8	1.0	—N/a	—N/a	—N/a	3.3	23.8	12.7
7–8 Nov	1,000	±3.1	EveryResearch / Medialocal	44.6	38.1	2.5	2.9	1.5	—N/a	—N/a	—N/a	3.9	6.5	6.5
7–8 Nov	1,007	±3.1	Flower Research	55.3	28.9	2.3	2.3	0.3	—N/a	—N/a	—N/a	0.6	10.3	26.4
6–7 Nov	1,004	±3.1	Realmeter / EKN	46.5	34.8	2.5	4.2	0.8	—N/a	—N/a	—N/a	1.7	9.5	11.7
4–6 Nov	1,002	±3.1	Gallup Korea	40	26	4	4	1	—N/a	0.1	—N/a	1	24	14
3–4 Nov	1,031	±3.0	Media Tomato / News Tomato	46.5	30.3	3.2	3.5	1.8	—N/a	—N/a	—N/a	2.1	12.6	16.2
3–4 Nov	1,000	±3.1	Gongjung / PennMike	47.3	38.4	3.2	3.2	0.8	—N/a	—N/a	—N/a	2.8	4.4	8.9
1–3 Nov	2,001	±2.2	Jowon C&I / Straight News	46.0	36.7	1.8	3.2	0.7	—N/a	—N/a	—N/a	1.1	10.5	9.3
2–3 Nov	1,005	±3.1	KIR / Cheonjiilbo	43.4	37.4	3.0	2.1	1.7	—N/a	—N/a	—N/a	2.9	9.5	6.0
31 Oct–1 Nov	1,004	±3.1	Flower Research	54.6	28.6	1.6	2.3	0.5	—N/a	—N/a	—N/a	1.0	11.6	26.0
29–31 Oct	1,000	±3.1	Researchview	40.8	33.6	4.3	5.1	1.7	1.3	1.0	0.9	3.0	8.4	7.2
30–31 Oct	1,004	±3.1	Realmeter / EKN	45.4	37.9	1.8	2.8	1.3	—N/a	—N/a	—N/a	2.0	8.8	7.5
28–30 Oct	1,002	±3.1	Gallup Korea	41	26	3	3	2	—N/a	0.2	0.1	1	26	15
27–29 Oct	1,001	±3.1	NBS	39	25	3	3	1	—N/a	—N/a	—N/a	2	25	14
27–28 Oct	1,002	±3.1	KSOI	41.4	36.4	2.2	2.9	0.7	—N/a	—N/a	—N/a	2.1	14.3	5.0
25–27 Oct	1,011	±3.1	Hangil Research / Kukinews	35.2	25.5	4.8	3.6	1.9	—N/a	—N/a	—N/a	3.3	25.7	9.7
24–25 Oct	1,002	±3.1	Flower Research	52.5	30.2	2.1	2.4	0.9	—N/a	—N/a	—N/a	0.7	11.2	22.3
23–24 Oct	1,004	±3.1	Hankook Research / Korea Times	44	25	2	2	1	—N/a	—N/a	—N/a	1	25	19
23–24 Oct	1,001	±3.1	Realmeter / EKN	44.1	37.3	3.3	3.5	1.5	—N/a	—N/a	—N/a	1.9	8.5	6.8
21–23 Oct	1,000	±3.1	Gallup Korea	43	25	3	2	1	—N/a	0.2	0.1	1	25	18
20–21 Oct	1,002	±3.1	KIR / Cheonjiilbo	42.4	36.2	3.8	3.4	1.7	—N/a	—N/a	—N/a	2.2	10.3	6.2
18–20 Oct	2,019	±2.2	Jowon C&I / Straight News	42.5	39.3	2.4	3.2	0.9	—N/a	—N/a	—N/a	1.2	10.4	3.2
18–19 Oct	1,000	±3.1	EveryResearch / Medialocal	41.9	37.7	3.4	3.8	0.9	—N/a	—N/a	—N/a	3.9	8.3	4.2
17–18 Oct	1,004	±3.1	Flower Research	53.9	26.9	2.4	3.2	0.5	—N/a	—N/a	—N/a	1.0	12.1	27.0
16–17 Oct	1,008	±3.1	Realmeter / EKN	46.5	36.7	3.1	3.0	1.4	—N/a	—N/a	—N/a	2.0	7.4	9.8
14–16 Oct	1,001	±3.1	Gallup Korea	39	25	3	3	1	—N/a	0.4	—N/a	1	28	14
13–15 Oct	1,000	±3.1	NBS	39	23	3	4	1	—N/a	—N/a	—N/a	2	29	16
13–14 Oct	1,000	±3.1	KSOI	42.3	32.2	1.6	2.7	1.1	—N/a	—N/a	—N/a	2.7	17.4	10.1
13–14 Oct	1,007	±3.1	KIR / Cheonjiilbo	41.7	38.2	2.5	3.2	1.1	—N/a	—N/a	—N/a	2.1	11.2	3.5
10–11 Oct	1,011	±3.1	Flower Research	53.3	29.0	2.6	3.8	1.2	—N/a	—N/a	—N/a	1.1	10.0	24.3
7–8 Oct	1,001	±3.1	KIR / Cheonjiilbo	43.0	39.4	2.8	2.5	0.6	—N/a	—N/a	—N/a	2.6	9.1	3.6
1–2 Oct	1,008	±3.1	Realmeter / EKN	47.2	35.9	3.3	2.8	1.0	—N/a	—N/a	—N/a	2.1	7.7	11.3
1–2 Oct	1,000	±3.1	Ipsos / SBS	46	26	3	4	1	—N/a	0	0	1	18	20
1–2 Oct	1,000	±3.1	Korea Research / MBC	44	27	4	4	1	—N/a	0	0	3	17	17
29 Sep–1 Oct	1,003	±3.1	NBS	41	22	3	3	1	—N/a	—N/a	—N/a	1	30	19
30 Sep–1 Oct	1,000	±3.1	KIR / Cheonjiilbo	43.0	37.2	3.2	2.6	0.8	—N/a	—N/a	—N/a	3.3	9.9	5.8
29–30 Sep	1,010	±3.1	Gallup Korea / Segye Ilbo	45	28	3	3	1	—N/a	1	0	1	18	17
28–30 Sep	1,000	±3.1	Researchview	42.5	33.2	4.0	3.4	0.9	1.3	0.7	0.5	1.8	11.7	9.3
28–29 Sep	1,016	±3.1	Ace Research / Newsis	41.5	29.0	3.5	3.8	2.0	—N/a	—N/a	—N/a	3.1	17.1	12.5
27–29 Sep	1,014	±3.1	Hangil Research / Kukinews	36.7	24.7	3.9	4.1	1.8	—N/a	—N/a	—N/a	6.9	21.7	12.0
27–29 Sep	2,002	±2.2	Jowon C&I / Straight News	43.7	38.8	2.4	2.6	0.5	—N/a	—N/a	—N/a	1.3	10.6	4.9
26–27 Sep	1,002	±3.1	Flower Research	51.4	27.4	2.2	3.6	0.8	—N/a	—N/a	—N/a	1.2	13.4	24.0
26–27 Sep	1,000	±3.1	KIR / Cheonjiilbo	40.5	37.8	3.8	4.0	0.9	—N/a	—N/a	—N/a	1.7	11.3	2.7
25–26 Sep	1,010	±3.1	Realmeter / EKN	43.3	38.3	3.0	3.4	0.8	—N/a	—N/a	—N/a	2.1	9.1	5.0
23–25 Sep	1,002	±3.1	Gallup Korea	38	24	3	3	1	—N/a	0.2	0.1	1	30	14
22–23 Sep	1,033	±3.0	Media Tomato / News Tomato	46.5	31.6	2.5	3.1	2.0	—N/a	—N/a	—N/a	2.4	12.0	14.9
22–23 Sep	1,000	±3.1	KSOI	42.6	32.5	1.9	3.1	1.4	—N/a	—N/a	—N/a	2.0	16.5	10.1
19–20 Sep	1,000	±3.1	EveryResearch / Medialocal	40.6	39.5	2.4	3.3	1.4	—N/a	—N/a	—N/a	3.7	9.1	1.1
19–20 Sep	1,005	±3.1	Flower Research	56.2	25.4	2.3	1.9	0.9	—N/a	—N/a	—N/a	0.9	12.3	30.8
19–20 Sep	1,001	±3.1	KIR / Cheonjiilbo	42.0	35.2	2.6	3.7	1.4	—N/a	—N/a	—N/a	1.7	13.4	6.8
18–19 Sep	1,007	±3.1	Realmeter / EKN	44.2	38.6	1.9	4.1	1.5	—N/a	—N/a	—N/a	2.1	7.5	5.6
16–18 Sep	1,001	±3.1	Gallup Korea	41	24	2	3	1	—N/a	0.3	0.1	1	28	17
15–17 Sep	1,002	±3.1	NBS	41	22	2	3	1	—N/a	—N/a	—N/a	1	29	19
14–18 Sep	1,012	±3.1	Gallup Korea / SisaIN	46.0	27.2	1.8	5.6	1.1	—N/a	0.3	0.1	1.5	16.3	18.8
13–15 Sep	2,000	±2.2	Jowon C&I / Straight News	45.1	36.2	1.9	2.9	0.6	—N/a	—N/a	—N/a	2.2	11.2	8.9
12–13 Sep	1,003	±3.1	Flower Research	56.3	25.5	1.5	3.1	0.6	—N/a	—N/a	—N/a	1.2	11.9	30.8
11–12 Sep	1,001	±3.1	Realmeter / EKN	44.3	36.4	2.6	4.4	1.5	—N/a	—N/a	—N/a	2.0	8.7	7.9
10–11 Sep	1,000	±3.1	KOPRA	44	39	3	3	1	—N/a	—N/a	—N/a	2	9	5
9–11 Sep	1,002	±3.1	Gallup Korea	42	24	2	3	1	—N/a	0.3	0.1	1	26	18
9–10 Sep	1,003	±3.1	Korea Research / MBC	48	22	2	4	1	—N/a	0	0	2	21	26
9–10 Sep	1,001	±3.1	KIR / Cheonjiilbo	43.9	36.1	1.8	3.0	0.5	—N/a	—N/a	—N/a	1.7	13.0	7.8
8–10 Sep	1,000	±3.1	Hankook Research / KBS	48	21	4	3	1	—N/a	—N/a	—N/a	1	22	27
8–9 Sep	1,037	±3.0	Media Tomato / News Tomato	49.3	30.9	2.6	2.5	1.3	—N/a	—N/a	—N/a	2.2	11.1	18.4
8–9 Sep	1,002	±3.1	KSOI	44.0	30.1	2.6	4.0	1.6	—N/a	—N/a	—N/a	3.0	14.7	13.9
3–7 Sep	2,207	±2.1	STI / Hankyoreh	48.0	29.5	4.3	5.3	0.8	—N/a	—N/a	—N/a	2.6	9.4	18.5
5–6 Sep	1,000	±3.1	EveryResearch / Medialocal	42.7	37.7	2.3	3.8	2.3	—N/a	—N/a	—N/a	3.6	9.4	5.0
5–6 Sep	1,001	±3.1	Flower Research	55.6	25.3	1.8	4.0	0.5	—N/a	—N/a	—N/a	0.6	12.2	30.3
5–6 Sep	1,009	±3.1	KIR / Cheonjiilbo	45.6	35.6	3.6	3.3	1.1	—N/a	—N/a	—N/a	0.8	10.0	10.0
4–5 Sep	1,005	±3.1	Realmeter / EKN	44.6	36.2	2.7	4.5	1.3	—N/a	—N/a	—N/a	2.0	8.6	8.4
2–4 Sep	1,002	±3.1	Gallup Korea	41	24	4	3	1	—N/a	0.3	—N/a	1	25	17
1–3 Sep	1,005	±3.1	NBS	43	20	5	4	1	—N/a	—N/a	—N/a	2	26	23
1–2 Sep	1,000	±3.1	Gongjung / PennMike	42.9	31.0	4.7	3.2	0.9	—N/a	—N/a	—N/a	4.4	13.0	11.9
30 Aug–1 Sep	2,003	±2.2	Jowon C&I / Straight News	42.6	39.0	2.3	3.5	0.6	—N/a	—N/a	—N/a	2.1	9.8	3.6
30 Aug–1 Sep	1,010	±3.1	Hangil Research / Kukinews	37.0	23.2	5.9	3.5	2.4	—N/a	—N/a	—N/a	5.1	23.0	13.8
29–31 Aug	1,000	±3.1	Researchview	42.6	31.2	5.1	4.6	0.8	1.0	0.5	0.3	3.2	10.7	11.4
29–30 Aug	1,008	±3.1	Flower Research	50.3	26.5	3.9	3.5	0.8	—N/a	—N/a	—N/a	1.1	14.0	23.8
29–30 Aug	1,000	±3.1	KIR / Cheonjiilbo	43.0	34.3	4.5	4.3	0.4	—N/a	—N/a	—N/a	1.8	11.7	8.7
28–29 Aug	1,006	±3.1	Realmeter / EKN	46.7	36.1	2.5	3.7	1.2	—N/a	—N/a	—N/a	1.4	8.4	10.6
27–28 Aug	1,002	±3.1	KSOI	47.0	30.7	2.8	3.2	0.7	—N/a	—N/a	—N/a	1.9	13.7	16.3
26–28 Aug	1,000	±3.1	Gallup Korea	44	23	2	3	1	—N/a	0.5	—N/a	2	25	21
25–26 Aug	1,031	±3.1	Media Tomato / News Tomato	39.1	37.3	4.9	5.3	0.7	—N/a	—N/a	—N/a	2.1	10.6	1.8
22–23 Aug	1,000	±3.1	EveryResearch / Medialocal	40.4	39.3	2.3	4.2	1.0	—N/a	—N/a	—N/a	4.3	8.5	1.1
22–23 Aug	1,005	±3.1	Flower Research	49.7	28.6	4.6	3.2	0.7	—N/a	—N/a	—N/a	0.7	12.4	21.1
21–22 Aug	1,004	±3.1	Realmeter / EKN	45.8	35.5	3.2	3.4	1.5	—N/a	—N/a	—N/a	2.7	7.9	10.3
19–21 Aug	1,004	±3.1	Gallup Korea	44	25	4	3	0.5	—N/a	1	—N/a	1	22	19
18–20 Aug	1,001	±3.1	NBS	40	19	4	4	2	—N/a	—N/a	—N/a	1	30	21
18–19 Aug	1,001	±3.1	KIR / Cheonjiilbo	43.1	33.2	4.1	3.9	0.6	—N/a	—N/a	—N/a	2.4	12.7	9.9
16–18 Aug	2,000	±2.2	Jowon C&I / Straight News	44.0	38.1	2.8	2.2	0.6	—N/a	—N/a	—N/a	1.6	10.8	5.9
15–16 Aug	1,007	±3.1	Flower Research	54.0	24.5	4.2	3.7	0.5	—N/a	—N/a	—N/a	1.0	12.1	29.5
12–14 Aug	1,007	±3.1	Gallup Korea	41	22	3	3	1	—N/a	0.1	0.1	2	28	19
11–12 Aug	1,037	±3.0	Media Tomato / News Tomato	43.7	33.8	3.5	3.6	1.1	—N/a	—N/a	—N/a	3.5	10.8	9.9
11–12 Aug	1,006	±3.1	KSOI	44.4	27.6	2.2	3.5	1.0	—N/a	—N/a	—N/a	2.8	18.5	16.8
11–12 Aug	1,002	±3.1	KIR / Cheonjiilbo	45.0	34.4	2.9	3.3	0.8	—N/a	—N/a	—N/a	2.8	10.8	10.6
8–9 Aug	1,001	±3.1	Flower Research	56.7	25.3	3.3	2.8	0.6	—N/a	—N/a	—N/a	1.0	10.2	31.4
7–8 Aug	1,006	±3.1	Realmeter / EKN	48.4	30.3	4.0	3.1	1.4	—N/a	—N/a	—N/a	4.3	8.4	18.1
4–6 Aug	1,001	±3.1	NBS	44	16	3	3	1	—N/a	—N/a	—N/a	2	30	28
4–5 Aug	1,005	±3.1	KIR / Cheonjiilbo	51.6	27.7	3.0	2.1	1.0	—N/a	—N/a	—N/a	3.6	11.0	23.9
2–4 Aug	2,018	±2.2	Jowon C&I / Straight News	47.8	32.9	2.6	3.2	1.1	—N/a	—N/a	—N/a	1.8	10.7	14.9
2–4 Aug	1,000	±3.1	EveryResearch / Medialocal	49.2	27.0	2.7	3.1	1.3	—N/a	—N/a	—N/a	5.9	10.9	22.2
1–2 Aug	1,009	±3.1	Flower Research	55.3	22.7	3.3	2.8	0.6	—N/a	—N/a	—N/a	1.5	13.7	32.6
31 Jul–1 Aug	1,012	±3.1	Realmeter / EKN	54.5	27.2	2.6	2.8	1.4	—N/a	—N/a	—N/a	3.0	8.5	27.3
29–31 Jul	1,000	±3.1	Researchview	49.6	21.6	3.9	4.3	0.8	1.5	0.8	1.0	3.2	13.4	28.0
29–30 Jul	1,003	±3.1	KIR / Cheonjiilbo	50.7	26.8	3.4	3.4	1.7	—N/a	—N/a	—N/a	1.2	12.8	23.9
28–29 Jul	1,036	±3.0	Media Tomato / News Tomato	47.4	29.3	2.9	5.0	1.6	—N/a	—N/a	—N/a	2.9	10.9	18.1
28–29 Jul	1,002	±3.1	KSOI	47.8	24.8	2.9	4.1	1.1	—N/a	—N/a	—N/a	2.4	16.8	23.0
27–28 Jul	1,002	±3.1	Ace Research / Newsis	47.0	22.5	4.6	3.7	0.6	—N/a	—N/a	—N/a	3.8	17.9	24.5
26–27 Jul	1,509	±2.5	Gongjung / PennMike	46.9	24.9	4.3	5.3	1.2	—N/a	—N/a	—N/a	4.2	13.3	22.0
25–26 Jul	1,007	±3.1	Flower Research	59.3	20.5	2.8	2.8	0.7	—N/a	—N/a	—N/a	1.2	12.7	38.8
24–25 Jul	1,005	±3.1	Realmeter / EKN	50.8	29.0	3.5	3.8	1.2	—N/a	—N/a	—N/a	2.3	9.3	21.8
22–23 Jul	1,003	±3.1	KIR / Cheonjiilbo	51.4	25.5	3.6	3.1	1.6	—N/a	—N/a	—N/a	2.7	12.1	25.9
21–23 Jul	1,001	±3.1	NBS	43	17	4	4	1	—N/a	—N/a	—N/a	2	29	26
21–22 Jul	1,038	±3.0	Media Tomato / News Tomato	48.0	26.2	4.1	4.0	1.1	—N/a	—N/a	—N/a	3.8	12.8	21.8
19–21 Jul	2,002	±2.2	Jowon C&I / Straight News	50.4	30.7	2.2	3.1	0.6	—N/a	—N/a	—N/a	1.8	11.2	19.7
18–19 Jul	1,007	±3.1	Flower Research	58.9	19.5	4.1	2.4	1.3	—N/a	—N/a	—N/a	1.6	12.1	39.4
17–18 Jul	1,003	±3.1	Realmeter / EKN	50.8	27.4	3.9	3.9	1.3	—N/a	—N/a	—N/a	4.1	8.6	23.4
16–17 Jul	1,003	±3.1	KIR / Cheonjiilbo	53.0	24.9	2.2	3.3	0.6	—N/a	—N/a	—N/a	3.9	12.1	28.1
15–17 Jul	1,000	±3.1	Gallup Korea	46	19	3	4	1	—N/a	0.4	0.3	0.4	26	27
14–15 Jul	1,000	±3.1	KSOI	49.1	25.3	2.9	2.6	1.3	—N/a	—N/a	—N/a	4.1	14.7	23.8
12–14 Jul	1,008	±3.1	Hangil Research / Kukinews	44.9	17.5	3.9	3.8	1.9	—N/a	—N/a	—N/a	4.2	23.8	27.4
11–12 Jul	1,000	±3.1	EveryResearch / Medialocal	50.8	25.6	2.6	4.5	0.7	—N/a	—N/a	—N/a	5.9	9.7	25.2
11–12 Jul	1,003	±3.1	Flower Research	57.8	20.7	3.5	2.9	1.0	—N/a	—N/a	—N/a	1.1	13.1	37.1
10–11 Jul	1,001	±3.1	KIR / Cheonjiilbo	52.8	25.5	4.6	3.3	1.0	—N/a	—N/a	—N/a	2.9	9.9	27.3
10–11 Jul	1,003	±3.1	Realmeter / EKN	56.2	24.3	3.9	3.7	0.4	—N/a	—N/a	—N/a	2.3	9.2	31.9
8–10 Jul	1,002	±3.1	Gallup Korea	43	19	4	3	1	—N/a	—N/a	0.1	2	27	24
7–9 Jul	1,003	±3.1	NBS	45	19	3	5	1	—N/a	—N/a	—N/a	2	25	26
8 Jul	1,009	±3.1	Hangil Research / Polinews	43.1	19.4	5.7	3.4	2.6	—N/a	—N/a	—N/a	5.9	19.9	23.7
7–8 Jul	1,042	±3.0	Media Tomato / News Tomato	48.2	27.0	4.8	4.7	1.3	—N/a	—N/a	—N/a	3.5	10.5	21.2
7–8 Jul	1,006	±3.1	KIR / Cheonjiilbo	51.3	25.4	4.0	4.3	0.7	—N/a	—N/a	—N/a	2.6	11.7	25.9
5–7 Jul	2,007	±2.2	Jowon C&I / Straight News	50.4	30.9	2.4	3.5	1.0	—N/a	—N/a	—N/a	2.6	9.2	19.5
4–5 Jul	1,007	±3.1	Flower Research	57.0	23.1	2.3	3.4	0.9	—N/a	—N/a	—N/a	1.2	12.1	33.9
3–4 Jul	1,003	±3.1	Realmeter / EKN	53.8	28.8	3.1	3.2	0.6	—N/a	—N/a	—N/a	2.9	7.5	25.0
1–3 Jul	1,001	±3.1	Gallup Korea	46	22	3	3	1	—N/a	0.4	—N/a	1	23	24
30 Jun–1 Jul	1,002	±3.1	KSOI / CBS	47.8	25.5	3.1	3.3	2.0	—N/a	—N/a	—N/a	2.6	15.9	22.3
28–30 Jun	1,000	±3.1	Researchview / KPI News	47.9	21.8	4.9	5.0	1.2	1.7	0.5	0.6	3,5	12.9	26.1
27–28 Jun	1,000	±3.1	EveryResearch / Medialocal	48.9	30.2	3.0	3.3	1.8	—N/a	—N/a	—N/a	5.4	7.5	18.7
27–28 Jun	1,008	±3.1	Flower Research	56.4	23.5	3.7	3.7	0.5	—N/a	—N/a	—N/a	1.6	10.5	32.9
26–27 Jun	1,000	±3.1	Realmeter / EKN	50.6	30.0	3.6	4.3	1.4	—N/a	—N/a	—N/a	2.9	7.3	20.6
24–26 Jun	1,004	±3.1	Gallup Korea	43	23	4	4	1	—N/a	0.3	0.1	1	24	20
25 Jun	1,034	±3.0	Hangil Research / Polinews	42.4	19.2	4.4	4.4	2.2	—N/a	—N/a	—N/a	6.2	21.1	23.2
23–25 Jun	1,000	±3.1	NBS	45	20	4	5	1	—N/a	—N/a	—N/a	2	23	25
23–24 Jun	1,042	±3.0	Media Tomato / News Tomato	47.3	32.5	3.3	4.4	1.0	—N/a	—N/a	—N/a	2.6	9.0	14.8
20–21 Jun	1,006	±3.1	Flower Research	53.7	25.2	4.2	4.2	0.9	—N/a	—N/a	—N/a	1.0	10.8	28.5
19–20 Jun	1,008	±3.1	Realmeter / EKN	48.4	31.4	2.9	4.9	1.6	—N/a	—N/a	—N/a	2.4	8.5	17.0
17–18 Jun	1,006	±3.1	KIR / Cheonjiilbo	50.0	27.1	3.6	4.7	0.9	—N/a	—N/a	—N/a	2.6	11.1	22.9
14-16 Jun	1,008	±3.1	Hangil Research / Kukinews	39.1	21.3	5.3	4.8	1.5	—N/a	—N/a	—N/a	4.0	24.0	17.8
12–13 Jun	1,003	±3.1	KIR / Cheonjiilbo	51.2	27.0	3.6	5.2	0.9	—N/a	—N/a	—N/a	2.9	9.2	24.2
12–13 Jun	1,000	±3.1	Realmeter / EKN	49.9	30.4	2.9	4.5	1.7	—N/a	—N/a	—N/a	2.4	8.2	19.5
10–12 Jun	1,000	±3.1	Gallup Korea	46	21	4	5	1	—N/a	0.1	—N/a	1	21	25
10–11 Jun	1,004	±3.1	KIR / Cheonjiilbo	49.7	30.9	4.2	4.2	0.9	—N/a	—N/a	—N/a	2.4	7.7	18.8
9–11 Jun	1,001	±3.1	NBS	45	23	3	6	2	—N/a	—N/a	—N/a	2	19	22
9–10 Jun	1,045	±3.0	Media Tomato / News Tomato	50.4	28.2	3.4	4.9	1.6	—N/a	—N/a	—N/a	2.3	9.2	22.2
6–7 Jun	1,009	±3.1	Flower Research	52.9	27.6	3.2	5.3	0.5	—N/a	—N/a	—N/a	1.8	8.7	25.3
4–5 Jun	1,012	±3.1	Realmeter / EKN	48.0	34.8	3.7	5.8	1.4	—N/a	—N/a	—N/a	1.7	4.7	13.2
3 Jun	1,536	±2.5	KOPRA / Asia Today	40.4	36.6	4.6	7.6	2.6	—N/a	—N/a	—N/a	2.1	6.1	3.8
31 May–2 Jun	3,004	±1.8	Flower Research	48.6	34.0	2.5	6.1	0.8	—N/a	—N/a	—N/a	1.1	7.0	14.6
27 May	1,012	±3.1	Jowon C&I / Straight News	45.2	35.4	1.8	7.4	—N/a	—N/a	—N/a	—N/a	1.3	8.9	9.8
27 May	1,544	±2.5	Hangil Research / Polinews	41.0	36.5	2.1	7.6	1.0	—N/a	—N/a	—N/a	2.7	8.9	4.5
27 May	1,000	±3.1	KOPRA / Asia Today	39	31	6	10	3	—N/a	—N/a	—N/a	3	9	8
26–27 May	1,039	±3.0	Media Tomato / News Tomato	44.7	34.8	—N/a	8.8	—N/a	—N/a	—N/a	—N/a	3.8	8.0	9.9
26–27 May	1,005	±3.1	Metavoice / JTBC	45	34	2	7	0	—N/a	0	0	1	9	11
26–27 May	1,000	±3.1	Researchview / KPI News	40.9	33.5	3.0	9.9	1.3	2.6	0.9	0.8	1.3	5.8	7.4
26–27 May	1,000	±3.1	Korea Research / MBC	42	35	2	9	0	—N/a	—N/a	0	1	10	7
26–27 May	5,028	±1.4	Metavoice / OhmyNews	43.1	37.5	2.0	8.6	0.9	—N/a	0.3	1.1	1.3	5.2	5.6
26–27 May	1,003	±3.1	Gallup Korea / SEDaily	40	35	4	6	1	—N/a	0	0	1	12	5
26–27 May	2,011	±2.2	Flower Research	50.0	32.8	1.9	8.1	0.5	—N/a	—N/a	—N/a	0.8	5.9	17.2
26–27 May	1,003	±3.1	Realmeter / EKN	46.8	35.1	1.7	8.9	0.3	—N/a	—N/a	—N/a	1.9	5.2	11.7
26–27 May	1,014	±3.1	Ace Research / Newsis	45.4	37.4	1.5	8.1	1.3	—N/a	—N/a	—N/a	0.7	5.7	8.0
26–27 May	1,005	±3.1	KSOI / CBS	44.2	33.1	2.1	9.0	1.9	—N/a	—N/a	—N/a	1.7	7.9	11.1
26–27 May	1,000	±3.1	Gongjung / Dailian	39.1	41.3	1.8	8.8	1.1	—N/a	—N/a	—N/a	2.4	5.5	2.2
25–27 May	1,003	±3.1	Ipsos / SBS	42	32	6	7	1	—N/a	1	—N/a	1	11	10
25–27 May	6,001	±1.3	Research Min / Newdaily	44.7	39.8	1.5	6.6	0.4	—N/a	—N/a	—N/a	1.5	5.3	4.9
25–27 May	1,000	±3.1	Hankook Research / KBS	39	34	5	8	1	—N/a	—N/a	—N/a	1	14	5
24–27 May	15,008	±0.8	Flower Research	47.1	37.0	2.3	9.7	1.1	—N/a	—N/a	—N/a	1.0	1.7	10.1
25–26 May	1,000	±3.1	Media Research / Newspim	43.4	39.5	1.6	7.1	1.3	—N/a	—N/a	—N/a	1.3	5.7	3.9
24–25 May	1,008	±3.1	Research&Research / Dong-A Ilbo	42.1	32.6	4.1	8.1	0.7	—N/a	0.1	0.2	1.2	10.8	9.5
24–25 May	2,004	±2.2	Jowon C&I / Straight News	42.7	36.6	2.0	6.0	—N/a	—N/a	—N/a	—N/a	2.2	10.6	6.1
24–25 May	3,028	±1.8	Ace Research / LPK	43.1	38.5	1.6	8.0	1.0	—N/a	—N/a	—N/a	1.3	6.4	4.6
24–25 May	1,010	±3.1	Jowon C&I / Hanyang Economy	35.1	36.2	4.1	4.5	—N/a	—N/a	—N/a	—N/a	2.6	17.6	1.1
24–25 May	1,011	±3.1	Gongjung / PennMike	42.9	39.9	1.8	7.9	0.7	—N/a	—N/a	—N/a	1.6	5.3	3.0
24–25 May	2,008	±2.2	Research Min / Newdaily	45.9	38.0	1.1	7.3	0.6	—N/a	—N/a	—N/a	1.5	5.6	7.9
23–25 May	1,003	±3.1	Next Research / MBN	44.5	35.2	0.9	8.3	0.4	—N/a	0.2	—N/a	0.7	9.8	9.3
24 May	1,001	±3.1	KOPRA / Asia Today	38	33	6	10	2	—N/a	—N/a	—N/a	3	9	5
23–24 May	2,004	±2.2	Flower Research	49.2	31.1	2.2	8.6	0.3	—N/a	—N/a	—N/a	0.7	7.8	18.1
23–24 May	1,001	±3.1	KSOI / CBS	42.6	38.4	1.9	7.9	0.9	—N/a	—N/a	—N/a	1.0	7.2	4.2
23–24 May	1,016	±3.1	KIR / Cheonjiilbo	43.9	39.4	2.0	7.2	0.4	—N/a	—N/a	—N/a	0.9	6.2	4.5
22–23 May	1,009	±3.1	Realmeter / EKN	43.5	37.8	3.0	7.7	0.7	—N/a	—N/a	—N/a	2.1	5.3	5.7
22–23 May	1,000	±3.1	Hangil Research / Polinews	41.0	37.0	1.9	5.7	0.8	—N/a	—N/a	—N/a	2.9	10.7	4.0
21–22 May	1,007	±3.1	Gongjung / PennMike	42.5	40.5	2.1	8.1	0.6	—N/a	—N/a	—N/a	1.3	4.9	2.0
21–22 May	2,005	±2.2	Flower Research	49.0	31.8	2.1	8.0	0.4	—N/a	—N/a	—N/a	0.6	8.1	17.2
21–22 May	1,002	±3.1	KIR / Cheonjiilbo	44.3	36.7	2.4	7.6	0.5	—N/a	—N/a	—N/a	2.2	6.4	7.6
20–22 May	3,000	±1.8	Hankook Research / KBS	43	33	5	6	1	—N/a	—N/a	—N/a	2	12	10
20–22 May	1,002	±3.1	Gallup Korea	42	36	2	6	0.5	—N/a	0.2	—N/a	0	13	6
21 May	1,009	±3.1	WinG Korea / Voice of Seoul	45.0	37.2	2.1	6.4	0.9	—N/a	—N/a	—N/a	1.8	6.6	7.8
20–21 May	1,007	±3.1	Gallup Korea / KARN	42	33	3	7	1	—N/a	0	0	1	13	9
20–21 May	1,002	±3.1	EveryResearch / Newsspirit	42.1	39.5	2.1	8.2	0.5	—N/a	—N/a	—N/a	3.1	4.4	2.6
20–21 May	1,012	±3.1	Realmeter / EKN	45.9	37.4	1.4	7.9	0.9	—N/a	—N/a	—N/a	1.8	4.7	8.5
19–21 May	1,002	±3.1	NBS	40	31	5	5	1	—N/a	—N/a	—N/a	1	17	9
19–20 May	1,014	±3.1	Research&Research / Channel A	41.1	33.0	4.6	4.8	1.0	—N/a	0.1	1.8	0.2	13.6	8.1
19–20 May	1,000	±3.1	Media Research / Newspim	45.3	37.2	2.2	8.2	0.8	—N/a	—N/a	—N/a	1.2	5.1	8.1
19–20 May	1,002	±3.1	KIR / Cheonjiilbo	44.4	35.0	2.8	6.8	1.1	—N/a	—N/a	—N/a	2.5	7.4	9.4
17–20 May	15,009	±0.8	Flower Research	50.4	34.6	2.7	7.6	1.1	—N/a	—N/a	—N/a	1.4	2.2	15.8
19 May	1,000	±3.1	Every Research	41.3	38.5	2.2	6.7	1.0	—N/a	—N/a	—N/a	3.1	7.2	2.8
18–19 May	1,004	±3.1	Ace Research / Newsis	46.5	37.2	2.4	4.9	0.8	—N/a	—N/a	—N/a	1.9	6.4	9.3
18–19 May	1,001	±3.1	Embrain Public / YTN	48	36	2	5	—N/a	—N/a	—N/a	—N/a	2	9	12
17–19 May	2,002	±2.2	Jowon C&I / Straight News	43.4	37.6	2.1	5.5	—N/a	—N/a	—N/a	—N/a	1.7	9.7	5.8
17–19 May	1,017	±3.1	Hangil Research / Polinews	41.9	36.7	2.1	5.2	1.5	—N/a	—N/a	—N/a	3.2	9.3	5.2
16–18 May	1,007	±3.1	Next Research / MBN	46.1	34.4	1.7	5.5	0.5	—N/a	—N/a	0.1	1.3	10.4	11.7
17 May	1,005	±3.1	KOPRA / Asia Today	39	32	6	9	2	—N/a	—N/a	—N/a	2	10	7
16–17 May	1,002	±3.1	Ipsos / Korea Economic Daily	49	33	3	6	0	—N/a	0	0	1	7	16
16–17 May	2,007	±2.2	Flower Research	50.3	32.0	2.7	5.8	0.5	—N/a	—N/a	—N/a	1.0	7.7	18.3
16–17 May	2,005	±2.2	Research Min / Newdaily	45.3	38.8	2.0	5.5	0.6	—N/a	—N/a	—N/a	1.6	6.2	6.5
16–17 May	1,007	±3.1	KSOI / CBS	43.9	35.3	2.9	6.7	0.9	—N/a	—N/a	—N/a	1.9	8.4	8.6
15–16 May	1,005	±3.1	KIR / Cheonjiilbo	46.1	34.9	2.6	4.9	0.5	—N/a	—N/a	—N/a	2.5	8.5	11.2
14–16 May	1,509	±2.5	Realmeter / EKN	46.4	34.2	2.8	5.9	0.9	—N/a	—N/a	—N/a	2.2	7.6	12.2
14–15 May	1,001	±3.1	Gongjung / PennMike	43.1	38.3	3.3	5.9	0.7	—N/a	—N/a	—N/a	2.8	5.7	4.8
14–15 May	1,003	±3.1	Korea Research / MBC	47	32	2	6	1	—N/a	—N/a	—N/a	1	11	15
14–15 May	2,012	±2.2	Flower Research	50.8	31.3	2.1	6.3	0.5	—N/a	—N/a	—N/a	1.3	7.8	19.5
13–15 May	1,000	±3.1	Hankook Research / KBS	39	31	5	7	1	—N/a	—N/a	—N/a	1	16	8
13–15 May	1,004	±3.1	Gallup Korea	48	30	2	4	1	—N/a	0.1	—N/a	1	15	18
14 May	1,000	±3.1	WinG Korea / Voice of Seoul	42.4	37.7	3.0	6.1	1.2	—N/a	—N/a	—N/a	2.2	7.4	4.7
13–14 May	1005	±3.1	Realmeter / Media Tribune	46.6	32.7	2.9	5.5	0.6	—N/a	—N/a	—N/a	5.5	6.1	13.9
13–14 May	1,002	±3.1	Hangil Research / Polinews	41.1	36.7	3.5	5.6	1.1	—N/a	—N/a	—N/a	2.7	9.2	4.4
12–14 May	1,000	±3.1	NBS	42	28	5	4	1	—N/a	—N/a	—N/a	1	19	14
13 May	1,004	±3.1	KOPRA / Asia Today	37	31	8	8	2	—N/a	—N/a	—N/a	3	11	6
12–13 May	3,000	±1.8	Hankook Research / Hankook Ilbo	36	25	7	6	1	—N/a	—N/a	—N/a	2	23	11
12–13 May	1,009	±3.1	Metavoice / OhmyNews	42.0	36.8	2.3	6.6	0.8	—N/a	0.5	2.2	2.0	6.8	5.2
12–13 May	2,004	±2.2	Flower Research	51.9	30.6	2.1	5.5	0.4	—N/a	—N/a	—N/a	1.0	8.5	21.3
12–13 May	1,033	±3.0	Media Tomato / News Tomato	49.1	32.8	2.6	5.1	0.7	—N/a	—N/a	—N/a	2.6	7.0	16.3
12–13 May	1,000	±3.1	Media Research / Newspim	46.5	35.5	2.9	6.3	1.0	—N/a	—N/a	—N/a	1.6	6.2	11.0
12–13 May	1,002	±3.1	KIR / Cheonjiilbo	43.3	36.9	3.9	4.6	0.6	—N/a	—N/a	—N/a	2.1	9.5	6.4
12–13 May	1,002	±3.1	Gallup Korea	47	33	2	5	1	—N/a	—N/a	—N/a	1	12	14
12–13 May	1,009	±3.1	Gongjung / PennMike	45.5	36.3	2.2	6.5	0.9	—N/a	—N/a	—N/a	1.9	6.8	9.2
12 May	1,000	±3.1	Every Research	41.1	37.8	2.6	4.9	1.1	—N/a	—N/a	—N/a	2.6	9.8	3.3
11–12 May	1,513	±2.5	Hangil Research / Global Economic	42.5	36.8	2.2	3.9	1.0	—N/a	—N/a	—N/a	2.6	10.9	5.7
11–12 May	1,003	±3.1	Embrain Public / YTN	45	34	3	5	—N/a	—N/a	—N/a	—N/a	2	11	11
10 May	1,001	±3.1	Hangil Research / Polinews	38.9	36.5	2.0	4.0	1.1	—N/a	—N/a	—N/a	3.6	14.0	2.4
9–10 May	2,002	±2.2	Flower Research	52.5	30.4	3.2	3.5	0.5	—N/a	—N/a	—N/a	1.3	8.6	22.1
9–10 May	1,002	±3.1	KSOI / CBS	42.3	39.4	1.9	4.2	0.7	—N/a	—N/a	—N/a	1.8	9.6	2.9
9 May	2,001	±2.2	KOPRA / Asia Today	42	35	5	5	1	—N/a	—N/a	—N/a	2	9	7
7–9 May	1,508	±2.5	Realmeter / EKN	46.9	37.7	2.9	3.4	0.2	—N/a	—N/a	—N/a	2.1	6.7	9.2
7–8 May	1,004	±3.1	Metavoice / OhmyNews	43.2	38.8	2.2	3.4	0.6	—N/a	0.3	1.0	2.8	7.7	4.4
7–8 May	2,006	±2.2	Flower Research	51.8	32.5	2.6	3.5	0.5	—N/a	—N/a	—N/a	1.3	7.6	19.3
6–8 May	3,000	±1.8	Hankook Research / KBS	41	32	6	4	1	—N/a	—N/a	—N/a	2	13	9
6–7 May	1,014	±3.1	Gallup Korea / SEDaily	46	34	2	4	0	—N/a	0	0	1	12	12
6–7 May	1,000	±3.1	Ace Research / Newsis	48.6	32.2	2.8	3.3	0.6	—N/a	—N/a	—N/a	2.4	10.2	16.4
5–7 May	1,000	±3.1	NBS	38	34	5	4	1	—N/a	—N/a	—N/a	2	16	4
5–6 May	1,003	±3.1	Ipsos / SBS	46	33	2	3	1	—N/a	0	—N/a	1	13	13
3–6 May	15,001	±0.8	Flower Research	52.0	35.6	2.6	4.0	0.9	—N/a	—N/a	—N/a	2.4	2.4	16.4
4–5 May	1,012	±3.1	Research&Research / Dong-A Ilbo	44.2	30.5	4.7	4.0	0.6	—N/a	0.3	—N/a	2.1	13.6	13.7
4–5 May	1,007	±3.1	Embrain Public / YTN	44	34	2	3	—N/a	—N/a	—N/a	—N/a	2	14	10
4 May	1,006	±3.1	Korea Research / MBC	48	34	1	3	1	—N/a	—N/a	—N/a	1	13	14
3–4 May	1,000	±3.1	Researchview / KPI News	45.2	31.8	4.8	3.9	0.8	2.8	0.6	0.4	2.6	7.2	13.4
2–3 May	2,010	±2.2	Flower Research	49.7	34.5	2.1	2.6	0.4	—N/a	—N/a	—N/a	1.5	9.1	15.2
30 Apr-2 May	1,000	±3.1	Researchview	39	38	4	3	1	3	0	0	2	9	1
30 Apr-2 May	1,509	±2.5	Realmeter / EKN	42.1	41.6	2.5	3.5	0.7	—N/a	—N/a	—N/a	1.7	7.8	0.5
30 Apr-1 May	2,002	±2.2	Flower Research	48.1	35.1	3.3	2.5	0.5	—N/a	—N/a	—N/a	1.8	8.7	13.0
28-30 Apr	1,000	±3.1	NBS	39	34	6	3	1	—N/a	—N/a	—N/a	2	17	5
28-29 Apr	1,013	±3.1	Media Tomato / News Tomato	43.6	38.8	2.5	3.2	0.9	—N/a	—N/a	—N/a	2.4	8.5	4.8
26-29 Apr	15,007	±0.8	Flower Research	48.3	38.5	3.1	3.6	1.0	—N/a	—N/a	—N/a	2.6	3.0	9.8
26-27 Apr	1,000	±3.1	Researchview / KPI News	39.9	35.9	5.5	3.6	1.1	1.7	0.3	0.7	2.8	8.7	4.0
26 Apr	1,012	±3.1	Research&Research / Channel A	42.1	34.4	5.3	2.8	0.6	—N/a	0.1	—N/a	3.7	11.0	7.7
25-26 Apr	1,001	±3.1	Flower Research	48.0	31.3	3.0	2.4	0.6	—N/a	—N/a	—N/a	1.6	13.1	16.7
25-26 Apr	2,005	±2.2	KOPRA / Asia Today	40	39	4	4	1	—N/a	—N/a	—N/a	3	10	1
25-26 Apr	1,003	±3.1	KSOI / CBS	42.9	38.3	1.9	2.5	0.4	—N/a	—N/a	—N/a	4.4	9.7	4.6
24-25 Apr	1,009	±3.1	Korea Research / MBC	44	34	3	3	1	—N/a	—N/a	—N/a	2	14	10
23-25 Apr	1,505	±2.5	Realmeter / EKN	46.8	34.6	2.7	3.9	1.0	—N/a	—N/a	—N/a	2.5	8.5	12.2
23-24 Apr	1,010	±3.1	Kstat / TV Chosun	37	36	7	3	1	—N/a	—N/a	—N/a	2	14	1
23-24 Apr	1,011	±3.1	Metavoice / JTBC	41	35	3	1	1	—N/a	0	0	2	15	6
23-24 Apr	1,004	±3.1	Embrain Public / YTN	44	36	3	2	—N/a	—N/a	—N/a	—N/a	3	12	8
23-24 Apr	1,004	±3.1	Gallup Korea / Kukmin Daily	39	35	5	2	1	—N/a	1	0	1	16	4
22-24 Apr	3,000	±1.8	Hankook Research / KBS	39	34	6	3	1	—N/a	—N/a	—N/a	2	16	5
22-24 Apr	1,005	±3.1	Gallup Korea	42	34	3	3	0.4	—N/a	—N/a	—N/a	1	16	8
23 Apr	2,090	±2.1	Embrain Public / Munhwa Ilbo	34	32	8	3	1	—N/a	—N/a	—N/a	1	21	2
21-23 Apr	1,005	±3.1	NBS	38	35	5	2	1	—N/a	—N/a	—N/a	2	17	3
19-21 Apr	2,002	±2.2	Jowon C&I / Straight News	46.2	33.7	2.8	3.2	—N/a	—N/a	—N/a	—N/a	2.9	11.3	12.5
19-20 Apr	1,000	±3.1	Researchview / KPI News	44.8	36.2	2.8	3.8	1.3	2.5	0.4	0.4	1.5	6.2	8.6
18-19 Apr	1,003	±3.1	Flower Research	49.1	31.1	4.7	1.5	1.1	—N/a	—N/a	—N/a	1.9	10.5	18.0
18-19 Apr	2,002	±2.2	KOPRA / Asia Today	43	34	4	4	1	—N/a	—N/a	—N/a	3	10	9
18-19 Apr	1,005	±3.1	KSOI / CBS	43.5	34.9	2.2	3.7	1.0	—N/a	—N/a	—N/a	2.9	11.7	8.6
16-18 Apr	1,504	±2.5	Realmeter / EKN	48.7	32.9	4.2	2.9	0.8	—N/a	—N/a	—N/a	2.2	8.4	13.6
15-17 Apr	1,000	±3.1	Gallup Korea	42	34	3	2	0.3	—N/a	0.3	—N/a	1	18	8
14-17 Apr	3,014	±1.8	Flower Research	52.0	30.5	4.1	2.0	0.7	—N/a	—N/a	—N/a	1.2	9.6	21.5
16 Apr	1,001	±3.1	WinG Korea / Voice of Seoul	47.4	36.9	3.0	2.6	1.4	—N/a	—N/a	—N/a	2.9	5.6	10.5
15-16 Apr	8,004	±1.1	Gongjung / Dailian	45.4	36.0	3.3	3.1	1.0	—N/a	—N/a	—N/a	3.2	8.0	9.4
14-16 Apr	1,001	±3.1	NBS	37	30	7	3	1	—N/a	—N/a	—N/a	2	19	7
14-15 Apr	1,039	±3.0	Media Tomato / News Tomato	46.8	32.0	3.2	2.3	1.2	—N/a	—N/a	—N/a	3.6	11.0	14.8
12-15 Apr	15,004	±0.8	Flower Research	49.9	35.3	3.9	3.5	1.0	—N/a	—N/a	—N/a	2.9	3.6	14.6
13-14 Apr	1,023	±3.1	Jowon C&I / Straight News	47.4	32.7	2.8	1.8	—N/a	—N/a	—N/a	—N/a	2.9	12.4	14.7
13-14 Apr	1,000	±3.1	Researchview / KPI News	44.7	36.7	3.4	3.3	0.2	2.5	0.3	0.8	1.6	6.5	8.0
13-14 Apr	1,002	±3.1	Gongjung / Pennmike	44.5	36.3	3.6	2.3	1.3	—N/a	—N/a	—N/a	2.8	9.2	8.2
12-13 Apr	1,022	±3.1	Rnsearch	43.4	36.3	3.8	3.2	—N/a	—N/a	—N/a	—N/a	3.6	9.6	7.1
11-12 Apr	1,003	±3.1	Korea Research / MBC	44	36	3	3	1	—N/a	—N/a	—N/a	1	13	8
11-12 Apr	1,002	±3.1	Flower Research	49.6	30.1	3.1	2.5	0.3	—N/a	—N/a	—N/a	1.3	13.1	19.5
11-12 Apr	1,002	±3.1	KSOI / CBS	42.8	37.3	2.9	3.2	0.8	—N/a	—N/a	—N/a	1.6	11.4	5.5
10-11 Apr	1,020	±3.1	Gallup Korea / Segye Ilbo	41	35	2	2	1	—N/a	1	0	1	17	6
9-11 Apr	1,506	±2.5	Realmeter / EKN	46.7	33.1	5.6	2.7	0.8	—N/a	—N/a	—N/a	3.5	7.7	13.6
9-10 Apr	1,000	±3.1	Gongjung / Pennmike	43.1	35.5	3.2	2.3	1.2	—N/a	—N/a	—N/a	4.7	10.0	7.6
8-10 Apr	3,000	±1.8	Hankook Research / KBS	36	31	8	3	1	—N/a	—N/a	—N/a	2	16	5
8-10 Apr	1,005	±3.1	Gallup Korea	41	30	3	3	1	—N/a	0.2	0.2	2	20	11
9 Apr	1,007	±3.1	WinG Korea / Voice of Seoul	48.8	35.0	2.9	2.7	0.8	—N/a	—N/a	—N/a	3.2	6.7	13.8
8-9 Apr	1,212	±2.8	Ace Research / Newsis	43.2	33.5	3.5	2.7	0.6	—N/a	—N/a	—N/a	4.2	12.2	9.7
8-9 Apr	1,004	±3.1	Gallup Korea / JoongAngIlbo	41	32	4	2	1	—N/a	0	0	1	18	9
8-9 Apr	1,000	±3.1	Media Research / Newspim	47.4	34.3	4.0	1.9	0.8	—N/a	—N/a	—N/a	3.5	8.2	13.1
7-9 Apr	1,001	±3.1	NBS	34	33	6	2	1	—N/a	—N/a	—N/a	3	19	1
6-7 Apr	1,008	±3.1	Gallup Korea / News1	43	31	4	2	1	—N/a	0	0	2	18	12
5-7 Apr	2,001	±2.2	Jowon C&I / Straight News	43.7	37.1	3.3	2.2	—N/a	—N/a	—N/a	—N/a	2.1	11.6	6.6
5-7 Apr	1,006	±3.1	Hangil Research / Kukinews	37.5	35.1	3.5	1.2	0.5	—N/a	—N/a	—N/a	4.7	17.4	2.4
4-7 Apr	1,000	±3.1	Hankook Research / PIPP	34	23	5	3	1	—N/a	0	—N/a	1	32	11
5-6 Apr	2,090	±2.1	Embrain Public / MBC	33	22	7	4	1	—N/a	—N/a	—N/a	3	30	11
5-6 Apr	1,000	±3.1	EveryResearch / Media Local	42.7	34.1	4.1	3.0	0.9	—N/a	—N/a	—N/a	4.8	10.3	8.6
5-6 Apr	1,011	±3.1	Metavoice / JTBC	40	31	5	2	1	—N/a	0	0	3	18	9
4-5 Apr	1,008	±3.1	Hangil Research / MBN	40.7	32.4	3.9	2.1	0.7	—N/a	—N/a	—N/a	2.6	17.6	8.3
4-5 Apr	1,012	±3.1	Gallup Korea / Sedaily	44	33	4	2	0	—N/a	0	0	1	14	11
4-5 Apr	1,006	±3.1	Flower Research	49.1	28.9	5.9	3.8	0.9	—N/a	—N/a	—N/a	0.9	10.5	20.2
4-5 Apr	1,003	±3.1	KSOI / CBS	43.0	37.8	3.8	1.9	0.7	—N/a	—N/a	—N/a	2.3	10.5	5.2
2-4 Apr	1,516	±2.5	Realmeter / EKN	44.8	35.7	5.2	3.3	1.2	—N/a	—N/a	—N/a	1.7	8.2	9.1
1-3 Apr	1,001	±3.1	Gallup Korea	41	35	4	2	0.5	—N/a	0.1	—N/a	1.2	17	6
31 Mar-2 Apr	1,001	±3.1	NBS	37	33	6	2	1	—N/a	—N/a	—N/a	1	19	4
31 Mar-1 Apr	1,062	±3.0	Media Tomato / News Tomato	47.5	36.4	4.7	1.3	1.0	—N/a	—N/a	—N/a	1.8	7.3	11.1
31 Mar-1 Apr	1,000	±3.1	EveryResearch / Newsspirit	43.8	39.8	3.0	1.7	0.8	—N/a	—N/a	—N/a	3.2	7.8	4.0
30-31 Mar	1,000	±3.1	Researchview / KPI News	45.8	32.4	6.1	2.7	0.6	0.9	0.8	0.7	2.0	8.0	13.4
29-31 Mar	1,000	±3.1	Researchview	44	34	6	3	0	1	1	1	2	7	10
28-29 Mar	1,001	±3.1	Flower Research	50.7	30.5	4.3	2.0	0.4	—N/a	—N/a	—N/a	0.5	11.6	20.2
28-29 Mar	1,002	±3.1	KOPRA / Asia Today	38	41	5	3	1	—N/a	—N/a	—N/a	2	10	3
28-29 Mar	1,006	±3.1	KSOI / CBS	45.3	35.9	3.1	1.4	1.1	—N/a	—N/a	—N/a	1.4	11.9	9.4
26-28 Mar	1,510	±2.5	Realmeter / EKN	47.3	36.1	3.7	2.3	1.0	—N/a	—N/a	—N/a	1.7	7.9	11.2
26-27 Mar	1,001	±3.1	Media Research / Newspim	47.3	34.8	3.9	2.0	1.2	—N/a	—N/a	—N/a	1.5	9.4	12.5
25-27 Mar	1,000	±3.1	Gallup Korea	41	33	2	2	1	—N/a	0.4	0.1	0.3	21	8
24-26 Mar	1,001	±3.1	NBS	36	36	7	3	1	—N/a	—N/a	—N/a	1	17	Tie
24-25 Mar	1,001	±3.1	Gongjung / Fntoday	42.6	40.8	2.9	2.5	0.8	—N/a	—N/a	—N/a	4.1	6.3	1.8
23-24 Mar	1,000	±3.1	Researchview / KPI News	45.8	34.4	6.8	3.0	1.2	1.4	1.2	0.1	1.3	4.8	11.4
22-24 Mar	2,012	±2.2	Jowon C&I / Straight News	43.6	39.0	2.9	1.2	—N/a	—N/a	—N/a	—N/a	1.3	12.0	4.6
21-22 Mar	1,008	±3.1	Flower Research	47.8	31.6	5.5	2.1	0.6	—N/a	—N/a	—N/a	0.7	11.8	16.2
21-22 Mar	1,000	±3.1	KSOI / CBS	42.2	39.4	3.0	2.0	0.8	—N/a	—N/a	—N/a	2.4	10.1	2.8
21-22 Mar	1,003	±3.1	KOPRA / Asia Today	35	44	5	3	1	—N/a	—N/a	—N/a	4	10	9
19-21 Mar	1,509	±2.5	Realmeter / EKN	43.6	40.0	4.3	1.3	0.8	—N/a	—N/a	—N/a	1.4	8.6	3.6
19-20 Mar	1,003	±3.1	WinG Korea / Voice of Seoul	43.9	42.2	4.0	1.1	0.7	—N/a	—N/a	—N/a	1.8	6.3	1.7
18-20 Mar	1,003	±3.1	Gallup Korea	40	36	3	1	1	—N/a	0.2	—N/a	0.2	19	4
17-20 Mar	3,004	±1.8	Flower Research	49.5	32.9	3.9	1.5	0.6	—N/a	—N/a	—N/a	1.0	10.5	16.6
17-19 Mar	1,003	±3.1	NBS	38	32	7	1	1	—N/a	—N/a	—N/a	2	19	6
17-18 Mar	1,037	±3.0	Media Tomato / News Tomato	44.9	37.5	3.7	1.7	0.7	—N/a	—N/a	—N/a	2.9	8.6	7.4
16-17 Mar	1,000	±3.1	Researchview / KPI News	42.2	39.7	6.5	1.5	0.8	0.6	0.8	0.8	2.0	5.2	2.5
15-16 Mar	1,002	±3.1	Ace Research / Newsis	42.9	38.7	3.9	1.3	0.6	—N/a	—N/a	—N/a	1.6	11.1	4.2
15-16 Mar	1,000	±3.1	KSOI / CBS	44.9	36.6	2.5	2.0	0.8	—N/a	—N/a	—N/a	1.0	12.2	8.3
14-15 Mar	1,010	±3.1	Flower Research	44.7	34.4	5.4	1.4	0.6	—N/a	—N/a	—N/a	1.0	12.6	10.3
14-15 Mar	1,001	±3.1	KOPRA / Asia Today	37	41	5	3	1	—N/a	—N/a	—N/a	2	11	4
12-14 Mar	1,510	±2.5	Realmeter / EKN	44.3	39.0	3.3	1.5	0.7	—N/a	—N/a	—N/a	2.4	8.8	5.3
11-13 Mar	1,001	±3.1	Gallup Korea	40	36	3	2	1	—N/a	0.2	—N/a	0.5	19	4
10-13 Mar	3,003	±1.8	Flower Research	47.1	35.1	3.9	1.6	0.5	—N/a	—N/a	—N/a	1.3	10.5	12.0
12 Mar	1,000	±3.1	WinG Korea / Voice of Seoul	43.1	43.6	3.0	1.8	0.7	—N/a	—N/a	—N/a	2.8	5.0	0.5
10-12 Mar	1,000	±3.1	NBS	36	38	5	2	0	—N/a	—N/a	—N/a	1	19	2
9-10 Mar	1,000	±3.1	Researchview / KPI News	43.5	40.0	6.1	2.0	0.9	0.7	0.8	0.8	1.9	3.4	3.5
8-10 Mar	2,001	±2.2	Jowon C&I / Straight News	40.4	41.9	2.7	1.6	—N/a	—N/a	—N/a	—N/a	2.0	11.4	1.5
8-10 Mar	1,022	±3.1	Hangil Research / Kukinews	39.2	38.5	3.4	2.2	1.1	—N/a	—N/a	—N/a	2.6	13.0	0.7
7-8 Mar	1,005	±3.1	Flower Research	45.0	34.3	5.9	1.6	1.0	—N/a	—N/a	—N/a	1.0	11.1	10.7
5-7 Mar	1,500	±2.5	Realmeter / EKN	41.0	42.7	3.9	1.7	1.1	—N/a	—N/a	—N/a	1	8.1	1.7
4-6 Mar	1,003	±3.1	Gallup Korea	40	36	2	2	1	—N/a	0.2	—N/a	1	18	4
3-5 Mar	1,000	±3.1	NBS	35	34	6	2	1	—N/a	—N/a	—N/a	2	20	1
4-5 Mar	1,048	±3.0	Media Tomato / News Tomato	37.6	43.4	4.8	2.7	1.0	—N/a	—N/a	—N/a	1.7	8.9	5.8
3-4 Mar	1,004	±3.1	Ace Research / Newsis	42.3	41.1	3.0	1.8	0.7	—N/a	—N/a	—N/a	2.2	9.0	1.2
2-3 Mar	1,000	±3.1	Researchview / KPI News	40.3	40.6	5.5	2.5	1.4	1.1	0.7	0.6	2.0	5.4	0.2
1-2 Mar	1,001	±3.1	KOPRA / Asia Today	38	42	5	3	1	—N/a	—N/a	—N/a	3	9	4
28 Feb-1 Mar	1,001	±3.1	KSOI / Digital Times	40.3	41.1	2.7	1.5	0.9	—N/a	0.5	1.0	1.5	10.7	0.8
28 Feb-1 Mar	1,000	±3.1	Flower Research	46.5	34.3	5.3	1.1	0.5	—N/a	—N/a	—N/a	1.0	11.3	12.2
26-28 Feb	1,000	±3.1	Researchview	39	39	7	2	1	1	1	1	2	7	Tie
26-28 Feb	1,506	±2.5	Realmeter / EKN	44.2	37.6	4.0	2.6	0.8	—N/a	—N/a	—N/a	1.9	8.8	6.8
26-27 Feb	1,004	±3.1	Flower Research	47.3	36.4	4.5	1.4	0.2	—N/a	—N/a	—N/a	0.9	9.4	10.9
25-27 Feb	1,000	±3.1	Gallup Korea	38	36	3	2	0.3	—N/a	0.1	—N/a	1	19	2
26 Feb	1,002	±3.1	Media Research / Newspim	41.3	42.1	2.8	2.0	0.9	—N/a	—N/a	—N/a	1.9	9.0	0.8
24-26 Feb	1,001	±3.1	NBS	34	37	6	2	1	—N/a	—N/a	—N/a	2	20	3
23-24 Feb	1,000	±3.1	Researchview / KPI News	43.0	38.8	5.2	1.7	0.8	1.0	0.7	0.4	1.3	7.3	4.2
22-24 Feb	2,004	±2.2	Jowon C&I / Straight News	40.0	44.1	2.4	1.6	—N/a	—N/a	—N/a	—N/a	1.4	10.5	4.1
21-22 Feb	1,000	±3.1	KOPRA / Asia Today	34	46	5	3	1	—N/a	—N/a	—N/a	2	8	12
21-22 Feb	1,003	±3.1	Flower Research	49.5	30.4	5.1	1.6	1.4	—N/a	—N/a	—N/a	1.2	10.7	19.1
20-21 Feb	1,006	±3.1	Realmeter / EKN	41.1	42.7	4.4	1.4	0.7	—N/a	—N/a	—N/a	1.9	7.8	1.6
19-20 Feb	1,010	±3.1	Flower Research	46.8	35.3	5.9	1.5	0.5	—N/a	—N/a	—N/a	1.0	9.1	11.5
18-20 Feb	1,002	±3.1	Gallup Korea	40	34	3	2	1	—N/a	0.2	0.5	1	18	6
18-19 Feb	1,001	±3.1	Media Research / Newspim	42.3	39.7	3.5	2.3	0.7	—N/a	—N/a	—N/a	3.1	8.2	2.6
17-19 Feb	1,000	±3.1	NBS	34	37	7	3	1	—N/a	—N/a	—N/a	2	17	3
18 Feb	1,002	±3.1	Gongjung / Dailian	37.2	49.0	3.6	1.6	0.4	—N/a	—N/a	—N/a	1.6	6.6	11.8
17-18 Feb	1,034	±3.0	Media Tomato / News Tomato	48.7	36.4	3.4	1.2	1.0	—N/a	—N/a	—N/a	1.9	7.5	12.3
16-17 Feb	1,000	±3.1	Researchview / KPI News	42.0	40.3	6.0	1.9	0.8	0.7	0.9	0.4	1.1	6.0	1.7
14-15 Feb	1,013	±3.1	Metavoice / JTBC	41	36	3	1	1	—N/a	1	0	1	17	5
14-15 Feb	1,004	±3.1	Flower Research	47.7	35.8	4.2	1.3	0.5	—N/a	—N/a	—N/a	1.4	9.1	11.9
14-15 Feb	1,000	±3.1	KOPRA / Asia Today	36	43	6	3	1	—N/a	—N/a	—N/a	3	8	7
13-14 Feb	1,000	±3.1	Realmeter / EKN	43.1	41.4	3.6	2.2	1.2	—N/a	—N/a	—N/a	1.1	7.4	1.7
11-13 Feb	1,004	±3.1	Gallup Korea	38	39	4	2	0.3	—N/a	0.3	0.1	1	16	1
12 Feb	1,023	±3.1	WinG Korea / Voice of Seoul	41.2	46.0	2.9	1.2	0.5	—N/a	—N/a	—N/a	1.4	6.8	4.8
10-12 Feb	1,001	±3.1	NBS	36	37	6	2	1	—N/a	—N/a	—N/a	1	17	1
9-10 Feb	1,000	±3.1	Researchview / KPI News	40.2	40.2	7.2	2.2	0.8	1.0	0.3	0.5	1.8	5.8	Tie
8-10 Feb	2,001	±2.2	Jowon C&I / Straight News	41.0	44.2	2.2	1.4	—N/a	—N/a	—N/a	—N/a	1.4	9.8	3.2
7-8 Feb	1,000	±3.1	EveryResearch / Newsspirit	38.4	41.9	3.3	2.7	0.3	—N/a	—N/a	—N/a	3.8	9.7	3.5
7-8 Feb	1,006	±3.1	Flower Research	48.2	34.3	5.0	1.7	0.5	—N/a	—N/a	—N/a	1.0	9.2	13.9
7-8 Feb	1,000	±3.1	KOPRA / Asia Today	36	42	5	3	1	—N/a	—N/a	—N/a	2	11	6
6-7 Feb	1,002	±3.1	Realmeter / EKN	40.8	42.8	3.4	2.4	1.0	—N/a	—N/a	—N/a	1.5	8.1	2.0
5-6 Feb	1,001	±3.1	Media Research / Newspim	41.4	43.2	4.5	1.5	0.7	—N/a	—N/a	—N/a	2.3	6.4	1.8
5 Feb	1,017	±3.1	WinG Korea / Voice of Seoul	42.9	44.6	1.6	1.6	0.7	—N/a	—N/a	—N/a	1.7	6.7	1.7
3-5 Feb	1,000	±3.1	NBS	37	39	4	2	0	—N/a	—N/a	—N/a	2	15	2
3-4 Feb	1,035	±3.0	Media Tomato / News Tomato	41.4	41.1	3.6	2.0	0.7	—N/a	—N/a	—N/a	1.3	9.8	0.3
3-4 Feb	1,007	±3.1	Gongjung / Dailian	42.5	42.1	3.1	1.9	0.7	—N/a	—N/a	—N/a	2.0	7.7	0.4
2-3 Feb	1,000	±3.1	Researchview / KPI News	42.5	38.7	5.9	2.5	0.5	1.2	0.5	0.5	1.7	6.0	3.8
1-2 Feb	1,000	±3.1	Ace Research / Newsis	39.7	43.7	3.0	1.9	0.4	—N/a	—N/a	—N/a	2.6	8.7	4.0
31 Jan-1 Feb	1,003	±3.1	Flower Research	50.4	34.3	3.5	2.3	0.5	—N/a	—N/a	—N/a	0.9	8.2	16.1
31 Jan-1 Feb	1,004	±3.1	Gallup Korea / Segye Ilbo	41	38	3	1	1	—N/a	0	—N/a	1	14	3
31 Jan-1 Feb	1,005	±3.1	KOPRA / Asia Today	39	43	5	2	1	—N/a	—N/a	—N/a	2	9	4
29–31 Jan	1,000	±3.1	Researchview	42	41	5	3	0	1	0	1	2	5	1
27-28 Jan	1,004	±3.1	Korea Research / MBC	44	41	4	2	0	—N/a	—N/a	—N/a	1	8	3
24–26 Jan	1,000	±3.1	Hankook Research / KBS	37	35	8	3	1	—N/a	—N/a	—N/a	2	15	2
24-25 Jan	2,001	±2.2	KOPRA / Asia Today	37	44	5	3	1	—N/a	—N/a	—N/a	1	9	7
24-25 Jan	1,004	±3.1	Kstat / MBC	32	38	7	3	1	—N/a	—N/a	—N/a	3	17	6
23-25 Jan	1,004	±3.1	Flower Research	45.2	37.8	4.3	1.8	0.8	—N/a	—N/a	—N/a	0.7	9.4	7.4
23-25 Jan	1,004	±3.1	Ipsos / SBS	39	39	4	2	1	—N/a	—N/a	—N/a	1	15	Tie
23-24 Jan	1,002	±3.1	Realmeter / EKN	41.7	45.4	4.5	1.0	1.0	—N/a	—N/a	—N/a	1.1	5.4	3.7
23-24 Jan	1,031	±3.1	Gallup Korea / JoongAngIlbo	40	41	4	2	1	—N/a	—N/a	0	1	12	1
22-23 Jan	1,002	±3.1	WinG Korea / Voice of Seoul	44.3	45.0	2.3	1.5	0.4	—N/a	—N/a	—N/a	1.4	5.0	0.7
22-23 Jan	1,003	±3.1	Embrain Public / YTN	38	42	4	2	1	—N/a	—N/a	—N/a	1	12	4
21-23 Jan	1,000	±3.1	Gallup Korea	40	38	3	1	1	—N/a	0.4	0.1	1	15	2
20-22 Jan	1,000	±3.1	NBS	36	38	5	2	1	—N/a	—N/a	—N/a	1	17	2
20-21 Jan	1,012	±3.1	Media Research / Newspim	38.8	48.5	3.8	1.3	0.4	—N/a	—N/a	—N/a	1.7	5.5	9.7
20-21 Jan	1,014	±3.1	Gongjung / Dailian	37.3	46.4	2.8	1.6	1.4	—N/a	—N/a	—N/a	3.1	7.4	9.1
19-20 Jan	1,000	±3.1	Researchview / KPI News	40.4	41.5	5.9	2.9	1.1	0.5	0.8	0.5	1.6	4.8	1.1
18-20 Jan	2,006	±2.2	Jowon C&I / Straight News	39.0	45.3	2.5	1.4	—N/a	—N/a	—N/a	—N/a	1.6	10.3	6.3
17-18 Jan	1,003	±3.1	KOPRA / Asia Today	35	46	5	3	2	—N/a	—N/a	—N/a	3	8	11
16-17 Jan	1,004	±3.1	Realmeter / EKN	39.0	46.5	4.2	1.9	0.7	—N/a	—N/a	—N/a	1.2	6.5	7.5
15-16 Jan	1,039	±3.0	WinG Korea / Voice of Seoul	42.8	46.4	1.7	1.7	0.6	—N/a	—N/a	—N/a	1.5	5.4	3.6
14-16 Jan	1,001	±3.1	Gallup Korea	36	39	4	2	1	—N/a	0.3	0.1	1	17	3
13-15 Jan	1,005	±3.1	NBS	33	35	8	3	1	—N/a	—N/a	—N/a	3	18	2
13-14 Jan	1,031	±3.0	Media Tomato / News Tomato	41.8	40.5	3.8	2.3	1.0	—N/a	—N/a	—N/a	2.7	7.8	1.3
12-13 Jan	1,000	±3.1	Researchview / KPI News	40.5	39.7	5.6	2.1	1.1	0.5	0.8	0.5	2.3	6.8	0.8
10-11 Jan	1,002	±3.1	KOPRA / Asia Today	35	42	7	3	1	—N/a	—N/a	—N/a	2	11	7
10-11 Jan	1,007	±3.1	Flower Research	43.9	33.2	6.2	2.5	0.6	—N/a	—N/a	—N/a	0.9	12.6	10.7
9-10 Jan	1,006	±3.1	Realmeter / EKN	42.2	40.8	4.8	2.4	1.2	—N/a	—N/a	—N/a	2.1	6.6	1.4
8-9 Jan	1,035	±3.0	WinG Korea / Voice of Seoul	43.9	41.1	4.0	1.9	0.3	—N/a	—N/a	—N/a	1.7	6.9	2.8
7-9 Jan	1,004	±3.1	Gallup Korea	36	34	5	2	1	—N/a	1	0.1	1	19	2
6-8 Jan	1,000	±3.1	NBS	36	32	7	3	1	—N/a	—N/a	—N/a	2	19	4
6-7 Jan	1,000	±3.1	Media Research / Newspim	40.4	40.0	4.7	2.1	0.9	—N/a	—N/a	—N/a	3.1	8.8	0.4
6-7 Jan	1,003	±3.1	Gongjung / Dailian	38.9	41.0	4.7	3.0	1.0	—N/a	—N/a	—N/a	3.1	8.3	2.1
5-6 Jan	1,000	±3.1	Researchview / KPI News	43.3	33.5	7.4	3.4	1.1	0.8	0.2	0.5	3.1	6.6	9.8
5-6 Jan	1,001	±3.1	Gongjung / Pennmike	40.9	40.2	3.6	2.7	1.2	—N/a	—N/a	—N/a	3.1	8.4	0.7
4-6 Jan	1,013	±3.1	Hangil Research / Kukinews	37.0	36.3	4.9	2.1	1.2	1.8	—N/a	—N/a	4.3	12.5	0.7
4-6 Jan	2,003	±2.2	Jowon C&I / Straight News	43.7	37.9	3.1	2.3	—N/a	—N/a	—N/a	—N/a	2.0	11.1	5.8
4-5 Jan	1,000	±3.1	KOPRA / Newdaily	33.7	38.8	5.6	2.5	1.9	—N/a	—N/a	—N/a	2.6	15.0	5.1
3-4 Jan	1,004	±3.1	KOPRA / Asia Today	39	36	7	2	1	—N/a	—N/a	—N/a	3	11	3
3-4 Jan	1,015	±3.1	Flower Research	47.1	26.8	6.1	2.9	1.1	—N/a	—N/a	—N/a	1.4	14.6	20.3
2-3 Jan	1,001	±3.1	Realmeter / EKN	45.2	34.4	4.8	3.1	1.1	—N/a	—N/a	—N/a	1.8	9.6	10.8
2 Jan	1,020	±3.1	Gongjung / Fntoday	42.4	36.5	4.1	3.0	1.0	—N/a	—N/a	—N/a	3.6	9.5	5.9

== 2024 ==
Fieldwork date	Sample size	Margin of error	Polling firm	DPK	PPP	RKP	RP	PP	NFP	BIP	SDP	Others	Und./ no ans.	Lead
30-31 Dec	1,033	±3.0	Media Tomato / News Tomato	47.8	30.4	5.2	3.5	1.2	—N/a	—N/a	—N/a	1.9	10.1	17.4
29–31 Dec	1,000	±3.1	Researchview	42	30	6	5	2	1	1	0	3	10	12
29–31 Dec	1,014	±3.1	Next Research / Maeil Business	35	21	5	2	1	—N/a	—N/a	—N/a	2	35	14
29–31 Dec	1,000	±3.1	Hankook Research / KBS	42	24	7	4	1	—N/a	—N/a	—N/a	1	22	18
29-30 Dec	1,003	±3.1	Korea Research / MBC	48	29	5	2	1	—N/a	—N/a	—N/a	2	14	19
29-30 Dec	1,010	±3.1	Ace Research / Newsis	40.4	35.7	4.3	3.3	1.3	—N/a	—N/a	—N/a	3.0	12.1	4.7
29-30 Dec	1,006	±3.1	Embrain Public / JoongAngIlbo	44	29	4	3	1	—N/a	—N/a	—N/a	1	18	15
29-30 Dec	1,008	±3.1	KIR / Cheonjiilbo	41.5	35.4	5.0	1.1	1.1	—N/a	—N/a	—N/a	1.7	14.2	6.1
28-29 Dec	1,000	±3.1	Research&Research / Dong-A Ilbo	38.2	27.0	9.7	3.5	0.8	—N/a	0.7	—N/a	1.3	18.9	11.2
28-29 Dec	1,000	±3.1	EveryResearch / Newsspirit	43.3	34.7	4.2	3.3	0.8	—N/a	—N/a	—N/a	3.3	10.4	8.6
28-29 Dec	1,020	±3.1	Metavoice / Kyunghyang Shinmun	36	27	6	2	1	—N/a	0	0	2	25	9
28-29 Dec	1,003	±3.1	Jowon C&I / Hanyangeconomy	37.8	38.2	3.2	3.0	—N/a	—N/a	—N/a	—N/a	2.9	14.9	0.4
26–27 Dec	1,000	±3.1	Hankook Research / Korea Times	39	25	8	3	1	—N/a	—N/a	—N/a	2	21	14
26-27 Dec	1,001	±3.1	Realmeter / EKN	45.8	30.6	6.0	3.0	2.1	—N/a	—N/a	—N/a	2.3	10.2	15.2
25 Dec	1,030	±3.1	Research&Research / Pennmike	45	25	7	5	2	0	—N/a	—N/a	2	15	20
23-24 Dec	1,000	±3.1	KIR / Cheonjiilbo	40.7	31.3	6.9	3.3	0.6	—N/a	—N/a	—N/a	2.1	15.1	9.4
23-24 Dec	1,013	±3.1	Gongjung / Dailian	44.1	30.3	5.5	4.1	1.3	3.2	—N/a	—N/a	3.6	7.9	13.8
22–23 Dec	1,000	±3.1	Hankook Research / Hankookilbo	43	23	7	3	1	—N/a	—N/a	—N/a	2	20	20
22–23 Dec	1,004	±3.1	Gongjung / Pennmike	41.1	32.8	7.7	3.5	1.4	3.7	—N/a	—N/a	1.5	8.4	8.3
20-21 Dec	1,000	±3.1	Flower Research	52.8	24.2	7.4	2.0	0.9	—N/a	—N/a	—N/a	1.1	11.6	28.6
19-20 Dec	1,001	±3.1	Realmeter / EKN	50.3	29.7	6.0	2.7	1.2	—N/a	—N/a	—N/a	1.9	8.2	20.6
18-19 Dec	1,001	±3.1	Media Research / Newspim	47.5	29.6	5.4	3.2	1.3	—N/a	—N/a	—N/a	1.6	11.3	17.9
17-19 Dec	1,000	±3.1	Gallup Korea	48	24	4	2	0.3	—N/a	—N/a	—N/a	1	21	24
16-18 Dec	1,002	±3.1	NBS	39	26	8	2	1	—N/a	—N/a	—N/a	1	24	13
16-17 Dec	1,036	±3.0	Media Tomato / News Tomato	50.4	25.8	5.5	4.3	1.2	—N/a	—N/a	—N/a	2.2	10.6	24.6
14-16 Dec	2,002	±2.2	Jowon C&I / Straight News	48.6	30.1	4.3	2.5	—N/a	—N/a	—N/a	—N/a	1.8	12.7	18.5
13-14 Dec	1,011	±3.1	Flower Research	53.1	21.2	7.1	3.1	1.2	—N/a	—N/a	—N/a	1.7	12.7	31.9
12-13 Dec	1,001	±3.1	Realmeter / EKN	52.4	25.7	8.0	2.8	1.1	—N/a	—N/a	—N/a	1.4	8.6	26.7
10-12 Dec	1,002	±3.1	Gallup Korea	40	24	8	4	1	—N/a	0.4	—N/a	1	23	16
10 Dec	1,005	±3.1	Embrain Public / News1	45	21	9	4	1	—N/a	—N/a	—N/a	2	18	24
9 Dec	1,001	±3.1	Gongjung / Dailian	42.5	23.6	7.3	5.0	1.4	5.0	—N/a	—N/a	3.9	11.3	18.9
7-9 Dec	2,002	±2.2	Jowon C&I / Straight News	48.9	30.4	4.0	2.8	—N/a	—N/a	—N/a	—N/a	1.1	12.8	18.5
8 Dec	1,000	±3.1	Researchview / KPI News	50.3	18.2	10.5	4.6	1.3	1.1	0.8	0.6	2.1	10.4	32.1
8 Dec	1,007	±3.1	Media Research / Newspim	50.0	23.1	8.4	3.6	0.9	—N/a	—N/a	—N/a	2.2	11.9	26.9
7-8 Dec	1,002	±3.1	Jowon C&I / Hanyangeconomy	48.3	30.9	3.7	3.0	—N/a	—N/a	—N/a	—N/a	1.1	13.0	17.4
6-7 Dec	1,014	±3.1	Gallup Korea / Kukminilbo	46	24	9	2	1	0	—N/a	—N/a	1	17	22
6-7 Dec	1,004	±3.1	Flower Research	50.6	21.8	8.8	2.4	0.7	—N/a	—N/a	—N/a	1.1	14.6	28.8
5-6 Dec	1,012	±3.1	Realmeter / EKN	47.6	26.2	7.3	4.3	0.8	—N/a	—N/a	—N/a	2.4	11.5	21.4
3-5 Dec	1,001	±3.1	Gallup Korea	37	27	7	2	0.3	—N/a	0.1	—N/a	1	26	10
4 Dec	1,047	±3.0	Media Research / Newspim	40.4	26.3	8.4	5.2	2.2	—N/a	—N/a	—N/a	2.2	15.2	14.1
2-3 Dec	1,008	±3.1	Media Tomato / News Tomato	49.8	27.5	8.0	3.2	1.0	—N/a	—N/a	—N/a	1.6	8.8	22.3
1-3 Dec	1,002	±3.1	EveryResearch / EveryNews	37.4	31.8	9.4	4.0	1.4	—N/a	—N/a	—N/a	4.3	11.6	5.6
29-30 Nov	1,001	±3.1	Flower Research	47.0	28.0	7.1	2.1	1.0	—N/a	—N/a	—N/a	0.6	14.1	19.0
28-30 Nov	1,000	±3.1	Researchview	45	29	7	4	1	1	1	0	2	9	16
25-29 Nov	1,002	±3.1	Realmeter / EKN	45.2	32.3	6.1	2.6	1.7	—N/a	—N/a	—N/a	2.6	9.6	12.9
26-28 Nov	1,001	±3.1	Gallup Korea	33	32	5	3	1	—N/a	0.3	—N/a	1	24	1
26-27 Nov	1,001	±3.1	KSOI / CBS	45.2	31.9	6.0	3.4	0.7	—N/a	—N/a	—N/a	2.6	10.3	13.3
25-26 Nov	1,000	±3.1	Media Research / Newspim	35.7	32.6	8.6	4.9	1.9	—N/a	—N/a	—N/a	2.2	14.2	3.1
23-25 Nov	2,001	±2.2	Jowon C&I / Straight News	47.7	30.7	5.0	2.8	—N/a	—N/a	—N/a	—N/a	2.1	11.6	17.0
22-23 Nov	1,001	±3.1	Flower Research	47.5	27.0	7.0	2.0	1.1	—N/a	—N/a	—N/a	0.7	14.7	20.5
21-22 Nov	1,003	±3.1	Realmeter / EKN	44.9	30.3	7.8	3.2	1.0	—N/a	—N/a	—N/a	1.6	11.3	14.6
19-21 Nov	1,001	±3.1	Gallup Korea	34	28	7	2	1	—N/a	0.3	0.1	1	27	6
18-20 Nov	1,002	±3.1	NBS	31	30	9	3	1	—N/a	—N/a	—N/a	1	24	1
18-19 Nov	1,018	±3.1	Media Tomato / News Tomato	50.3	26.2	7.3	3.0	0.9	—N/a	—N/a	—N/a	2.1	10.1	24.1
18-19 Nov	1,000	±3.1	Gongjung / Dailian	39.4	31.0	6.8	3.0	1.4	3.1	—N/a	—N/a	4.0	11.2	8.4
15-16 Nov	1,004	±3.1	Flower Research	49.5	24.2	9.6	2.7	0.7	—N/a	—N/a	—N/a	1.2	12.1	25.3
14-15 Nov	1,003	±3.1	Realmeter / EKN	47.5	31.6	5.6	3.6	0.9	—N/a	—N/a	—N/a	2.0	8.8	15.9
12-14 Nov	1,002	±3.1	Gallup Korea	34	27	7	3	1	—N/a	0.3	0.1	2	26	7
11-12 Nov	1,002	±3.1	Media Research / Newspim	35.4	32.3	8.0	4.8	1.6	—N/a	—N/a	—N/a	3.9	14.0	3.1
10-11 Nov	1,010	±3.1	Ace Research / Newsis	41.9	30.2	6.8	4.0	2.1	—N/a	—N/a	—N/a	1.9	13.1	11.7
9-11 Nov	2,000	±2.2	Jowon C&I / Straight News	46.3	32.3	5.8	2.5	—N/a	—N/a	—N/a	—N/a	1.8	11.3	14.0
8-10 Nov	1,000	±3.1	EveryResearch / EveryNews	44.3	28.5	9.4	2.4	0.8	—N/a	—N/a	—N/a	2.7	12.0	15.8
8-9 Nov	1,005	±3.1	Flower Research	49.5	25.7	7.8	2.3	1.0	—N/a	—N/a	—N/a	1.2	12.6	23.8
7-8 Nov	1,003	±3.1	Realmeter / EKN	43.7	30.7	9.0	4.0	1.4	—N/a	—N/a	—N/a	1.6	9.6	13.0
5-7 Nov	1,002	±3.1	Gallup Korea	36	29	7	3	1	—N/a	0.2	0.1	1	24	7
4-6 Nov	1,002	±3.1	NBS	31	29	11	3	2	—N/a	—N/a	—N/a	2	23	2
4-5 Nov	1,010	±3.1	Media Tomato / News Tomato	50.3	27.2	7.4	3.9	1.4	—N/a	—N/a	—N/a	1.9	8.1	23.1
4-5 Nov	1,000	±3.1	Gongjung / Dailian	33.3	37.7	7.8	4.3	1.9	2.9	—N/a	—N/a	3.3	8.9	4.4
1-2 Nov	1,002	±3.1	KSOI / Ohmynews	42.0	29.1	6.7	3.5	1.5	—N/a	—N/a	—N/a	2.7	14.6	12.9
1-2 Nov	1,010	±3.1	Flower Research	46.6	27.3	9.3	3.0	0.8	—N/a	—N/a	—N/a	0.7	12.3	19.3
31 Oct-1 Nov	1,011	±3.1	Gallup Korea / Joongang Ilbo	34	29	11	4	2	—N/a	0	0	2	19	5
31 Oct-1 Nov	1,009	±3.1	Realmeter / EKN	47.1	29.4	7.0	4.5	2.0	—N/a	—N/a	—N/a	1.8	8.3	17.7
29-31 Oct	1,000	±3.1	Researchview	41	30	10	4	1	1	1	1	2	9	11
29-31 Oct	1,005	±3.1	Gallup Korea	32	32	7	2	1	—N/a	—N/a	0.1	1	25	Tie
27-28 Oct	1,007	±3.1	Embrain / Munhwa Ilbo	24	23	9	3	1	—N/a	—N/a	—N/a	1	39	1
28-29 Oct	1,001	±3.1	Media Research / Newspim	34.4	34.4	9.5	4.0	2.2	—N/a	—N/a	—N/a	3.2	12.1	Tie
26-28 Oct	2,000	±2.2	Jowon C&I / Straight News	45.6	33.2	5.7	3.1	—N/a	—N/a	—N/a	—N/a	2.0	10.4	12.4
25-26 Oct	1,003	±3.1	Flower Research	45.5	29.3	7.6	2.4	0.9	—N/a	—N/a	—N/a	0.9	13.4	16.2
24-25 Oct	1,004	±3.1	Realmeter / EKN	43.2	32.6	6.8	3.7	1.7	—N/a	—N/a	—N/a	2.2	9.8	10.6
22-24 Oct	1,001	±3.1	Gallup Korea	30	30	6	4	1	—N/a	0.3	—N/a	1	27	Tie
21-23 Oct	1,000	±3.1	NBS	30	28	8	3	1	—N/a	—N/a	—N/a	2	29	2
22 Oct	1,004	±3.1	Gongjung / Dailian	34.3	32.7	7.6	5.6	1.4	3.3	—N/a	—N/a	3.4	11.6	1.6
21-22 Oct	1,012	±3.1	Media Tomato / News Tomato	50.4	22.4	8.8	3.8	1.5	—N/a	—N/a	—N/a	2.8	10.3	28.0
18-19 Oct	1,005	±3.1	Flower Research	45.9	26.4	9.1	3.3	0.6	—N/a	—N/a	—N/a	0.6	14.1	19.5
17-18 Oct	1,003	±3.1	Realmeter / EKN	44.2	31.3	7.4	4.6	1.3	—N/a	—N/a	—N/a	1.8	9.4	12.9
15-17 Oct	1,001	±3.1	Gallup Korea	30	28	8	3	1	—N/a	0.7	—N/a	1	27	2
14-15 Oct	1,000	±3.1	Media Research / Newspim	35.8	34.2	8.9	3.8	1.7	—N/a	—N/a	—N/a	2.7	13.0	1.6
12-14 Oct	2,002	±2.2	Jowon C&I / Straight News	44.1	33.9	6.6	3.4	—N/a	—N/a	—N/a	—N/a	2.1	9.9	10.2
11-12 Oct	1,003	±3.1	Flower Research	43.5	26.9	9.4	1.9	0.5	—N/a	—N/a	—N/a	1.3	16.5	16.6
10-11 Oct	1,001	±3.1	Realmeter / EKN	43.9	30.8	9.3	3.8	1.1	—N/a	—N/a	—N/a	2.0	9.1	13.1
8-9 Oct	1,004	±3.1	Media Tomato / News Tomato	46.3	26.0	9.5	3.9	1.5	—N/a	—N/a	—N/a	2.7	10.1	20.3
7-9 Oct	1,000	±3.1	NBS	28	27	11	2	1	—N/a	—N/a	—N/a	1	30	1
7-8 Oct	1,000	±3.1	Gongjung / Dailian	35.2	37.9	7.3	4.4	1.4	1.2	—N/a	—N/a	3.1	9.5	2.7
4-5 Oct	1,007	±3.1	Flower Research	41.9	29.0	9.6	2.6	1.2	—N/a	—N/a	—N/a	0.9	14.9	12.9
2-4 Oct	1,004	±3.1	Realmeter / EKN	42.4	32.7	8.6	5.1	0.5	—N/a	—N/a	—N/a	2.1	8.6	9.7
30 Sep-1 Oct	1,003	±3.1	Media Research / Newspim	36.0	33.7	9.7	4.5	2.1	—N/a	—N/a	—N/a	2.9	11.1	2.3
28-30 Sep	1,000	±3.1	Researchview	40	30	11	5	1	2	1	1	3	7	10
28-30 Sep	2,001	±2.2	Jowon C&I / Straight News	42.3	35.6	6.5	2.7	—N/a	—N/a	—N/a	—N/a	2.4	10.7	6.7
28-29 Sep	1,002	±3.1	Ace Research / Newsis	35.7	33.0	8.8	4.0	1.1	—N/a	—N/a	—N/a	2.7	14.8	2.7
27-28 Sep	1,000	±3.1	Flower Research	42.5	26.8	9.9	3.1	1.3	—N/a	—N/a	—N/a	1.3	15.1	15.7
26-27 Sep	1,003	±3.1	Realmeter / EKN	43.2	29.9	9.2	4.3	1.8	—N/a	—N/a	—N/a	2.3	9.3	13.3
24-26 Sep	1,001	±3.1	Gallup Korea	32	31	8	4	1	—N/a	0.2	0.2	1	23	1
23-25 Sep	1,005	±3.1	NBS	26	28	12	4	1	—N/a	—N/a	—N/a	1	28	2
23-24 Sep	1,005	±3.1	Gongjung / Dailian	35.4	32.6	8.8	6.3	0.8	1.7	—N/a	—N/a	3.0	11.4	2.8
20-21 Sep	1,010	±3.1	Flower Research	39.5	28.5	8.9	3.2	0.8	—N/a	—N/a	—N/a	1.2	17.8	11.0
19-20 Sep	1,001	±3.1	Realmeter / EKN	39.2	35.2	9.1	4.5	1.2	—N/a	—N/a	—N/a	1.9	8.9	4.0
18-19 Sep	1,000	±3.1	Media Research / Newspim	34.1	32.9	9.1	6.0	2.2	—N/a	—N/a	—N/a	3.3	12.5	1.2
12-13 Sep	1,001	±3.1	Realmeter / EKN	39.6	33.0	10.7	4.2	0.9	—N/a	—N/a	—N/a	1.8	9.8	6.6
11-12 Sep	1,002	±3.1	Korea Research / MBC	30	33	11	4	1	—N/a	—N/a	—N/a	2	20	3
10-12 Sep	1,002	±3.1	Gallup Korea	33	28	8	2	1	—N/a	0.4	0.2	1	26	5
10-12 Sep	2,004	±2.2	Jowon C&I / Straight News	45.1	34.2	5.7	3.7	—N/a	—N/a	—N/a	—N/a	1.9	9.4	10.9
10 Sep	1,002	±3.1	Gongjung / Dailian	33.8	34.0	10.0	5.4	1.6	1.1	—N/a	—N/a	2.8	11.4	0.2
7-8 Sep	1,000	±3.1	EveryResearch / Newsspirit	39.0	29.6	10.0	6.3	1.4	—N/a	—N/a	—N/a	2.3	11.2	9.4
6-7 Sep	1,003	±3.1	Flower Research	42.0	29.0	7.6	2.8	1.2	—N/a	—N/a	—N/a	0.8	16.7	13.0
5-6 Sep	1,001	±3.1	Realmeter / EKN	40.1	34.6	7.8	4.1	2.2	—N/a	—N/a	—N/a	2.5	8.6	5.5
3-5 Sep	1,001	±3.1	Gallup Korea	32	31	7	2	0.3	—N/a	0.4	—N/a	1	26	1
2-4 Sep	1,001	±3.1	NBS	26	27	12	4	1	—N/a	—N/a	—N/a	2	28	1
2-3 Sep	1,000	±3.1	Media Research / Newspim	34.3	33.7	8.7	4.8	1.2	2.3	—N/a	—N/a	3.7	11.3	0.6
31 Aug-2 Sep	2,003	±2.2	Jowon C&I / Straight News	43.6	34.3	5.3	4.3	—N/a	—N/a	—N/a	—N/a	1.8	10.7	9.3
29-31 Aug	1,000	±3.1	Researchview	37	31	12	5	0	1	0	1	2	10	6
28-29 Aug	1,001	±3.1	KIR / Cheonjiilbo	42.0	38.0	6.3	3.2	0.5	—N/a	—N/a	—N/a	1.3	8.7	4.0
29-30 Aug	1,008	±3.1	Realmeter / EKN	42.2	32.8	8.0	3.9	2.2	1.6	—N/a	—N/a	1.9	7.4	9.4
27-29 Aug	1,002	±3.1	Gallup Korea	31	30	7	2	1	0.3	0.2	0.1	2	26	1
26-27 Aug	1,009	±3.1	Media Tomato / News Tomato	44.6	30.7	9.7	3.2	1.6	1.0	—N/a	—N/a	2.6	6.6	13.9
26-27 Aug	1,002	±3.1	Gongjung / Dailian	34.4	35.3	9.7	4.8	1.4	1.4	—N/a	—N/a	4.3	8.7	0.9
23-24 Aug	1,010	±3.1	Flower Research	43.3	27.4	10.1	3.1	0.6	—N/a	—N/a	—N/a	0.9	14.7	15.9
22-23 Aug	1,000	±3.1	Realmeter / EKN	40.0	37.0	7.7	3.6	1.1	1.4	—N/a	—N/a	1.4	7.9	3.0
20-22 Aug	1,000	±3.1	Gallup Korea	31	32	8	2	1	1	1	0.2	2	22	1
19-21 Aug	1,002	±3.1	NBS	29	31	9	2	1	—N/a	—N/a	—N/a	1	26	2
20-21 Aug	1,004	±3.1	KOPRA / Kihoilbo	36.3	36.4	7.7	4.5	0.6	—N/a	—N/a	—N/a	2.1	12.4	0.1
19-20 Aug	1,008	±3.1	Media Tomato / News Tomato	43.5	32.4	8.6	3.0	1.0	1.7	—N/a	—N/a	2.0	7.7	11.1
19-20 Aug	1,000	±3.1	Media Research / Newspim	34.7	34.2	8.4	4.4	1.0	1.2	—N/a	—N/a	3.8	12.4	0.5
17-19 Aug	1,025	±3.1	Hangil Research / Kukinews	31.9	30.8	7.9	4.4	2.3	1.4	—N/a	—N/a	3.5	17.9	1.1
17-19 Aug	2,006	±2.2	Jowon C&I / Straight News	44.2	35.1	5.8	3.4	—N/a	—N/a	—N/a	—N/a	2.2	9.4	9.1
16-17 Aug	1,004	±3.1	Flower Research	41.0	29.3	9.7	2.4	0.6	—N/a	—N/a	—N/a	1.7	15.4	11.7
14-16 Aug	1,005	±3.1	Realmeter / EKN	42.2	31.0	9.7	3.1	1.4	2.2	—N/a	—N/a	1.2	9.3	11.2
12-13 Aug	1,007	±3.1	Media Tomato / News Tomato	41.4	33.3	9.8	3.7	0.6	1.4	—N/a	—N/a	3.2	6.6	8.1
12-13 Aug	1,006	±3.1	Gongjung / Dailian	33.2	38.9	7.7	5.1	1.4	2.2	—N/a	—N/a	3.5	8.0	5.7
9-10 Aug	1,009	±3.1	Flower Research	39.2	29.1	11.0	2.4	1.0	—N/a	—N/a	—N/a	1.2	16.1	10.1
5-9 Aug	1,001	±3.1	Realmeter / EKN	36.8	37.8	8.6	4.5	1.3	1.8	—N/a	—N/a	1.5	7.7	1.0
5-7 Aug	1,001	±3.1	NBS	24	32	10	3	1	—N/a	—N/a	—N/a	1	29	8
5-6 Aug	1,011	±3.1	Media Tomato / News Tomato	38.8	34.0	10.7	3.8	1.3	1.6	—N/a	—N/a	2.5	7.2	4.8
5-6 Aug	1,001	±3.1	Media Research / Newspim	30.3	38.6	9.6	3.7	0.8	1.1	—N/a	—N/a	3.3	12.5	8.3
3-5 Aug	2,002	±2.2	Jowon C&I / Straight News	40.5	36.9	6.3	4.6	—N/a	—N/a	—N/a	—N/a	2.2	9.5	3.6
2-3 Aug	1,005	±3.1	Flower Research	42.0	31.6	9.0	2.7	0.6	—N/a	—N/a	—N/a	0.5	13.6	10.4
29 Jul-2 Aug	1,002	±3.1	Realmeter / EKN	36.3	38.5	9.4	4.3	1.9	0.9	—N/a	—N/a	1.6	7.2	2.2
29-31 Jul	1,000	±3.1	Researchview	36	36	11	5	1	2	1	1	1	6	Tie
29-30 Jul	1,009	±3.1	Media Tomato / News Tomato	39.9	35.9	10.0	3.7	1.1	1.4	—N/a	—N/a	2.1	6.0	4.0
29-30 Jul	1,005	±3.1	Gongjung / Dailian	32.0	40.0	7.9	4.8	1.6	1.7	—N/a	—N/a	3.4	8.6	8.0
26-27 Jul	1,003	±3.1	Flower Research	38.2	30.7	9.3	3.9	0.6	—N/a	—N/a	—N/a	1.1	16.2	7.5
25-26 Jul	1,003	±3.1	Realmeter / EKN	36.1	38.4	9.2	4.4	1.2	1.4	—N/a	—N/a	2.4	6.9	2.3
23-25 Jul	1,001	±3.1	Gallup Korea	27	35	9	3	1	0.2	0.2	0.1	1	23	8
22-24 Jul	1,005	±3.1	NBS	25	36	9	3	1	—N/a	—N/a	—N/a	3	22	11
22-23 Jul	1,020	±3.1	Media Tomato / News Tomato	35.8	40.5	8.4	3.8	0.5	1.2	—N/a	—N/a	1.7	8.0	4.7
20-22 Jul	4,029	±1.5	Jowon C&I / Straight News	40.2	39.7	5.8	4.0	—N/a	—N/a	—N/a	—N/a	2.2	8.3	0.5
19-20 Jul	1,002	±3.1	Flower Research	38.7	31.3	11.0	3.1	0.8	—N/a	—N/a	—N/a	1.8	13.3	7.4
18-19 Jul	1,003	±3.1	Realmeter / EKN	33.2	42.1	9.3	5.0	0.8	1.4	—N/a	—N/a	1.3	7.0	8.9
16-18 Jul	1,000	±3.1	Gallup Korea	27	35	8	4	1	1	0	—N/a	1	23	8
15-16 Jul	1,008	±3.1	Media Tomato / News Tomato	38.1	37.7	8.8	3.9	1.3	1.7	—N/a	—N/a	2.7	5.8	0.4
15-16 Jul	1,003	±3.1	Gongjung / Dailian	32.0	41.3	7.4	5.7	1.4	1.3	—N/a	—N/a	3.1	7.9	9.3
14-15 Jul	1,002	±3.1	Aceresearch / Newsis	30.0	41.0	9.6	3.3	1.5	—N/a	—N/a	—N/a	2.2	12.4	11.0
12-13 Jul	1,002	±3.1	Flower Research	42.3	36.6	10.5	4.0	1.6	—N/a	—N/a	—N/a	2.2	2.8	5.7
11-12 Jul	1,001	±3.1	Realmeter / EKN	35.0	38.0	10.3	4.3	1.8	1.5	—N/a	—N/a	1.3	7.9	3.0
9-11 Jul	1,000	±3.1	Gallup Korea	30	35	8	3	1	0	0	0	1	22	5
8-10 Jul	1,000	±3.1	NBS	27	30	12	5	1	—N/a	—N/a	—N/a	2	24	3
8-9 Jul	1,001	±3.1	Media Tomato / News Tomato	34.5	38.1	9.8	4.8	0.7	1.9	—N/a	—N/a	2.0	8.1	3.6
8-9 Jul	1,000	±3.1	Media Research / Newspim	28.4	40.6	9.0	6.2	1.3	1.7	—N/a	—N/a	3.8	8.9	12.2
7-8 Jul	2,003	±2.2	Embrain Public / YTN	30	35	10	4	1	—N/a	—N/a	—N/a	2	18	5
5-6 Jul	1,000	±3.1	Flower Research	43.1	32.3	12.8	5.8	1.6	—N/a	—N/a	—N/a	2.2	2.1	10.8
4-5 Jul	1,001	±3.1	Realmeter / EKN	38.2	36.0	10.9	3.8	1.2	1.8	—N/a	—N/a	1.6	6.6	2.2
2-4 Jul	1,002	±3.1	Gallup Korea	29	33	9	4	1	0	0	0	1	23	4
1-2 Jul	1,023	±3.1	Media Tomato / News Tomato	38.0	35.8	11.3	3.2	1.2	1.0	—N/a	—N/a	3.6	6.0	2.2
28-30 Jun	1,000	±3.1	Researchview	32	34	14	5	1	1	1	1	3	7	2
28-29 Jun	1,001	±3.1	Flower Research	44.5	33.4	11.0	5.3	0.8	—N/a	—N/a	—N/a	2.3	2.6	11.1
27-28 Jun	1,004	±3.1	Realmeter / EKN	34.1	36.7	12.2	5.4	2.1	1.0	—N/a	—N/a	1.3	7.1	2.6
25-27 Jun	1,002	±3.1	Gallup Korea	32	31	10	4	0	1	0	0	1	21	1
24-26 Jun	1,007	±3.1	NBS	25	29	13	4	1	—N/a	—N/a	—N/a	1	27	4
24-25 Jun	1,005	±3.1	Media Tomato / News Tomato	36.3	32.5	10.1	4.9	1.7	1.2	—N/a	—N/a	1.7	11.6	3.8
22-24 Jun	2,006	±2.2	Jowon C&I / Straight News	42.8	33.7	8.3	4.5	—N/a	—N/a	—N/a	—N/a	2.8	7.9	9.1
21-22 Jun	1,000	±3.1	Flower Research	40.7	32.2	14.5	5.3	1.4	—N/a	—N/a	—N/a	2.1	3.7	8.5
20-21 Jun	1,006	±3.1	Realmeter / EKN	37.2	36.2	10.7	4.8	1.4	1.5	—N/a	—N/a	1.8	6.5	1.0
18-20 Jun	1,002	±3.1	Gallup Korea	28	32	9	4	2	1	0	0	1	23	4
17-18 Jun	1,002	±3.1	Gongjung / Dailian	31.2	36.7	10.4	6.2	1.9	1.3	—N/a	—N/a	4.9	7.3	5.5
15-16 Jun	1,023	±3.1	Media Tomato / News Tomato	34.9	31.4	11.3	5.1	2.3	1.7	—N/a	—N/a	2.0	11.3	3.5
14-15 Jun	1,003	±3.1	Flower Research	42.2	31.6	15.3	5.5	0.7	—N/a	—N/a	—N/a	2.4	2.3	10.6
14-15 Jun	1,001	±3.1	Gallup Korea / News1	32	33	12	4	1	0	0	0	1	18	1
13-14 Jun	1,001	±3.1	Realmeter / EKN	35.4	35.9	13.2	4.9	1.5	1.5	—N/a	—N/a	1.5	6.2	0.5
11-13 Jun	1,000	±3.1	Gallup Korea	27	30	11	4	1	1	0	0	2	23	3
10-12 Jun	1,004	±3.1	NBS	26	29	13	5	1	—N/a	—N/a	—N/a	3	23	3
8-9 Jun	1,023	±3.1	Media Tomato / News Tomato	34.8	30.2	12.6	4.8	1.3	1.5	—N/a	—N/a	2.9	11.8	4.6
7-8 Jun	1,004	±3.1	Flower Research	39.4	31.9	15.6	5.8	1.8	—N/a	—N/a	—N/a	2.9	2.8	7.5
5-7 Jun	1,000	±3.1	Realmeter / EKN	35.6	34.5	13.0	5.2	1.3	1.6	—N/a	—N/a	1.6	7.2	1.1
1-2 Jun	1,008	±3.1	Media Tomato / News Tomato	34.7	28.6	14.6	5.5	1.2	1.7	—N/a	—N/a	2.5	11.3	6.1
31 May-1 Jun	1,002	±3.1	Flower Research	41.8	28.6	17.6	6.4	1.9	—N/a	—N/a	—N/a	1.9	1.9	13.2
30–31 May	1,002	±3.1	Realmeter / EKN	33.8	33.1	14.5	5.3	1.1	1.4	—N/a	—N/a	2.0	8.7	0.7
28–30 May	1,000	±3.1	Researchview	34	31	14	4	2	2	—N/a	—N/a	4	9	3
28–30 May	1,001	±3.1	Gallup Korea	29	30	13	2	1	0	—N/a	—N/a	3	22	1
27–29 May	1,004	±3.1	NBS	27	30	12	3	1	1	—N/a	—N/a	3	24	3
24–25 May	1,000	±3.1	Flower Research	41.2	30.8	14.5	5.6	1.4	2.1	—N/a	—N/a	2.1	2.3	10.4
23–24 May	1,004	±3.1	Realmeter / EKN	33.9	35.2	13.8	4.8	1.2	1.3	—N/a	—N/a	2.2	7.6	1.3
21–23 May	1,001	±3.1	Gallup Korea	31	29	11	4	1	0	—N/a	—N/a	2	22	2
17–18 May	1,001	±3.1	Flower Research	36.2	32.0	18.4	5.4	1.2	1.9	—N/a	—N/a	2.6	2.3	4.2
16–17 May	1,001	±3.1	Realmeter / EKN	34.5	35.0	13.5	5.3	1.3	1.3	—N/a	—N/a	2.2	6.8	0.5
13–15 May	1,001	±3.1	NBS	27	31	12	4	0	1	—N/a	—N/a	3	22	4
10–11 May	1,004	±3.1	Flower Research	45.1	28.1	14.1	4.0	1.8	1.3	—N/a	—N/a	3.0	2.6	17.0
9–10 May	1,002	±3.1	Realmeter / EKN	40.6	32.9	12.5	4.1	0.5	2.1	—N/a	—N/a	2.3	5.1	7.7
7–9 May	1,000	±3.1	Gallup Korea	30	34	11	5	1	—N/a	—N/a	—N/a	1	19	4
3–4 May	1,000	±3.1	Flower Research	43.3	30.9	14.2	4.6	1.2	1.8	—N/a	—N/a	2.0	1.9	12.4
2–3 May	1,000	±3.1	Realmeter / EKN	36.1	32.1	13.4	5.4	0.8	2.5	—N/a	—N/a	3.5	6.1	4.0
29 Apr-1 May	1,000	±3.1	NBS	29	31	12	4	1	1	—N/a	—N/a	3	18	2
28-30 Apr	1,000	±3.1	Researchview	34	31	14	5	2	3	—N/a	—N/a	3	7	3
26-27 Apr	1,001	±3.1	Flower Research	41.1	29.4	16.8	5.5	1.7	1.9	—N/a	—N/a	2.1	1.6	11.7
25-26 Apr	1,004	±3.1	Realmeter / EKN	35.1	34.1	13.5	6.2	1.6	1.8	—N/a	—N/a	2.7	5.1	1.0
23-25 Apr	1,001	±3.1	Gallup Korea	29	33	13	3	0	1	—N/a	—N/a	2	19	4
20-21 Apr	1,004	±3.1	Media Tomato / News Tomato	34.9	29.8	17.8	5.5	1.3	1.7	—N/a	—N/a	1.8	7.3	5.1
18-19 Apr	1,002	±3.1	Realmeter / EKN	35.0	35.8	14.4	4.8	1.1	2.2	—N/a	—N/a	1.5	5.2	0.8
16-18 Apr	1,000	±3.1	Gallup Korea	31	30	14	3	0	0	—N/a	—N/a	1	19	1
15-17 Apr	1,004	±3.1	NBS	32	32	13	4	—N/a	1	—N/a	—N/a	3	16	Tie
15-16 Apr	1,001	±3.1	Media Research / Newspim	28.5	39.2	14.2	4.9	—N/a	2.2	—N/a	—N/a	4.5	6.5	10.7
13-15 Apr	1,004	±3.1	Hangil Research / Kukinews	28.8	35.2	14.7	5.0	1.6	2.2	—N/a	—N/a	3.4	9.0	6.4
13-15 Apr	2,013	±2.2	Jowon C&I / Straight News	35.8	33.0	12.5	5.5	0.9	2.4	—N/a	—N/a	4.2	5.6	2.8
13-14 Apr	1,017	±3.1	Media Tomato / News Tomato	34.2	31.3	14.8	5.5	2.3	2.1	—N/a	—N/a	1.8	7.9	2.9
12-13 Apr	1,002	±3.1	Flower Research	39.4	30.9	18.3	5.9	1.2	1.9	—N/a	—N/a	1.6	0.8	8.5
10 Apr	2024 election			26.70	36.67	24.25	3.62	—N/a (Note: with DPK)	1.71	—N/a	—N/a	7.05	—N/a	9.97

== See also ==
- Opinion polling for the 2020 South Korean legislative election
- Opinion polling for the 2024 South Korean legislative election
- Opinion polling on the Lee Jae Myung presidency
