= Opinion polling on the Lee Jae Myung presidency =

Lee Jae Myung was inaugurated on 4 June 2025, as president of South Korea.

The following articles are lists of opinion pollings on his presidency. For more information, visit the National Election Survey Deliberation Committee of Korea.

LOESS regression of the Opinion Polling for the Lee Jae Myung Presidency.

== 2026 ==
Fieldwork date	Sample size	Margin of error	Polling firm	Approve	Disapprove	Und./ no ans.	Net
28–30 Sep	1,000	±3.1	NBS (Note: Embrain Public, KStat Research, Korea Research, Hankook Research)	43	50	7	7
28–29 Sep	1,010	±3.1	Ace Research / Newsis	39.1	59.2	1.7	20.1
28–29 Sep	1,001	±3.1	KSOI	38.5	57.8	3.8	19.3
21–23 Sep	1,508	±2.5	Realmeter / EKN	37.9	60.1	2.0	22.2
21–22 Sep	1,001	±3.1	Embrain Public / KBS	42	51	7	9
19–21 Sep	2,007	±2.2	Jowon C&I / Straight News	37.0	60.8	2.2	23.8
15–20 Sep	1,592	±2.5	STI / Hankyoreh	49.3	46.5	4.2	2.8
18–19 Sep	1,003	±3.1	Flower Research	47.5	52.3	0.2	4.8
14–18 Sep	2,507	±2.0	Realmeter / EKN	34.8	63.4	1.8	28.6
15–17 Sep	1,002	±3.1	Gallup Korea	37	56	7	19
14–15 Sep	1,001	±3.1	KSOI	35.9	59.4	4.7	23.5
11–12 Sep	1,002	±3.1	Flower Research	45.7	53.7	0.6	8.0
10–11 Sep	2,515	±2.0	Realmeter / EKN	33.8	63.3	2.9	29.5
8–10 Sep	1,000	±3.1	Gallup Korea	38	51	11	13
7–9 Sep	1,002	±3.1	NBS	43	48	9	5
4–5 Sep	1,002	±3.1	Flower Research	47.1	51.8	1.1	4.7
31 Aug–4 Sep	2,510	±2.0	Realmeter / EKN	37.4	59.5	3.1	22.1
1–3 Sep	1,001	±3.1	Gallup Korea	40	51	9	11
31 Aug–1 Sep	1,000	±3.1	KSOI	41.2	53.9	4.9	12.7
28–29 Aug	1,004	±3.1	Flower Research	49.5	50.0	0.5	0.5
24–28 Aug	2,509	±2.0	Realmeter / EKN	38.9	58.7	2.5	19.8
25–27 Aug	1,001	±3.1	Gallup Korea	42	50	8	8
24–26 Aug	1,001	±3.1	NBS	50	43	6	7
21–22 Aug	1,007	±3.1	Flower Research	51.4	47.7	1.0	3.7
18–21 Aug	2,026	±2.2	Realmeter / EKN	40.2	56.9	3.0	16.7
18-20 Aug	1,004	±3.1	Gallup Korea	45	45	11	Tie
18–19 Aug	1,001	±3.1	KSOI	42.8	52.5	4.7	9.7
14–15 Aug	1,000	±3.1	Flower Research	53.5	45.4	1.1	8.1
10–14 Aug	2,511	±2.0	Realmeter / EKN	43.0	54.1	2.9	11.1
11-13 Aug	1,000	±3.1	Gallup Korea	44	46	10	2
10–12 Aug	1,001	±3.1	NBS	52	43	5	9
10–11 Aug	1,033	±3.0	Media Tomato / News Tomato	44.2	51.8	4.0	7.6
9–10 Aug	1,018	±3.1	Ace Research / Newsis	44.3	51.5	4.2	7.2
8–10 Aug	2,001	±2.2	Jowon C&I / Straight News	42.9	54.1	3.1	11.2
7–8 Aug	1,002	±3.1	Flower Research	53.8	45.2	1.0	8.6
3–7 Aug	2,514	±2.0	Realmeter / EKN	43.3	53.0	3.6	9.7
3–4 Aug	1,037	±3.0	Media Tomato / News Tomato	47.7	48.5	3.8	0.8
3–4 Aug	1,002	±3.1	KSOI	47.8	46.8	5.4	1.0
31 Jul–1 Aug	1,001	±3.1	Flower Research	56.6	42.2	1.2	14.4
27–31 Jul	2,508	±2.0	Realmeter / EKN	45.9	50.5	3.5	4.6
27–29 Jul	1,000	±3.1	NBS	53	37	10	16
27–28 Jul	1,033	±3.0	Media Tomato / News Tomato	51.7	43.6	4.7	8.1
25–27 Jul	2,002	±2.2	Jowon C&I / Straight News	47.4	49.5	3.1	2.1
24–25 Jul	1,000	±3.1	Flower Research	58.9	40.2	0.9	18.7
20–24 Jul	2,505	±2.0	Realmeter / EKN	46.3	49.5	4.2	3.2
21-23 Jul	1,003	±3.1	Gallup Korea	51	38	11	13
20–21 Jul	1,036	±3.0	Media Tomato / News Tomato	49.8	45.4	4.8	4.4
20–21 Jul	1,000	±3.1	KSOI	48.8	46.7	4.5	2.1
17–18 Jul	1,004	±3.1	Flower Research	61.4	37.6	1.0	23.8
14–16 Jul	1,003	±3.1	Gallup Korea	52	37	11	15
13–16 Jul	2,007	±2.2	Realmeter / EKN	48.4	48.0	3.6	0.4
13–15 Jul	1,000	±3.1	NBS	55	34	11	21
11–13 Jul	2,019	±2.2	Jowon C&I / Straight News	49.4	47.8	2.8	1.6
10–11 Jul	1,004	±3.1	Flower Research	63.3	36.0	0.6	27.3
6–10 Jul	2,515	±2.0	Realmeter / EKN	48.9	47.7	3.4	1.2
7–9 Jul	1,002	±3.1	Gallup Korea	53	35	12	18
6–7 Jul	1,037	±3.0	Media Tomato / News Tomato	48.6	47.2	4.2	1.4
6–7 Jul	1,002	±3.1	KSOI	54.7	40.9	4.4	13.8
3–4 Jul	1,006	±3.1	Flower Research	63.2	36.0	0.8	27.2
29 Jun–3 Jul	2,525	±2.0	Realmeter / EKN	47.0	49.2	2.2	2.2
30 Jun–2 Jul	1,005	±3.1	Gallup Korea	54	36	10	18
29 Jun–1 Jul	1,000	±3.1	NBS	58	35	7	23
29-30 Jun	1,000	±3.1	KIR / Cheonjiilbo	45.2	52.0	2.8	6.8
27–29 Jun	2,000	±2.2	Jowon C&I / Straight News	47.6	49.9	2.6	2.3
22–26 Jun	2,502	±2.0	Realmeter / EKN	46.5	49.5	4.0	3.0
23–25 Jun	1,000	±3.1	Gallup Korea	51	41	7	10
22–23 Jun	1,035	±3.0	Media Tomato / News Tomato	44.8	50.3	4.9	5.5
22-23 Jun	1,004	±3.1	KIR / Cheonjiilbo	47.0	49.7	3.4	2.7
22–23 Jun	1,005	±3.1	KSOI	47.7	48.2	4.1	0.5
20–22 Jun	1,006	±3.1	Hangil Research / Kukinews	45.2	51.9	3.0	6.7
15–19 Jun	2,517	±2.0	Realmeter / EKN	46.7	49.7	3.6	3.0
15-16 Jun	1,029	±3.1	KIR / Cheonjiilbo	49.6	47.8	2.6	1.8
13–15 Jun	2,001	±2.2	Jowon C&I / Straight News	47.7	49.0	3.3	1.3
12–13 Jun	1,003	±3.1	Flower Research	66.1	33.3	0.6	32.8
8–12 Jun	2,515	±2.0	Realmeter / EKN	51.5	44.2	4.3	7.3
9–11 Jun	1,002	±3.1	Gallup Korea	57	35	8	22
8–10 Jun	1,001	±3.1	NBS	57	33	10	24
8–9 Jun	1,036	±3.0	Media Tomato / News Tomato	54.0	40.9	5.1	13.1
8-9 Jun	1,001	±3.1	KIR / Cheonjiilbo	53.8	43.5	2.7	10.3
8–9 Jun	1,001	±3.1	KSOI	50.4	45.7	3.8	4.7
6–8 Jun	2,000	±2.2	Jowon C&I / Straight News	50.6	45.5	3.9	5.1
5–6 Jun	1,004	±3.1	Flower Research	69.3	29.2	1.5	40.1
1–5 Jun	2,013	±2.2	Realmeter / EKN	55.2	41.0	3.8	14.2
1-2 Jun	1,002	±3.1	KIR / Cheonjiilbo	57.0	38.9	4.1	18.1
26–29 May	2,008	±2.2	Realmeter / EKN	59.1	36.8	4.2	22.3
26–27 May	1,001	±3.1	KSOI	59.8	35.2	5.0	24.6
25 May	1,000	±3.1	KIR / Cheonjiilbo	59.0	37.8	3.2	21.2
23–25 May	2,001	±2.2	Jowon C&I / Straight News	57.0	38.8	4.3	18.2
22–23 May	1,003	±3.1	Flower Research	72.9	26.0	1.2	46.9
18–22 May	2,507	±2.0	Realmeter / EKN	59.3	36.1	4.7	23.2
19–21 May	1,002	±3.1	Gallup Korea	64	28	8	36
18–20 May	1,001	±3.1	NBS	66	24	10	42
18–19 May	1,039	±3.0	Media Tomato / News Tomato	59.2	35.6	5.2	23.6
18-19 May	1,000	±3.1	KIR / Cheonjiilbo	58.9	36.2	5.0	22.7
16–18 May	2,012	±2.2	Jowon C&I / Straight News	59.9	37.0	3.1	22.9
15–16 May	1,001	±3.1	Flower Research	72.5	26.5	0.9	46.0
11–15 May	2,506	±2.0	Realmeter / EKN	60.5	35.1	4.4	25.4
12–14 May	1,011	±3.1	Gallup Korea	61	28	11	33
11-12 May	1,004	±3.1	KIR / Cheonjiilbo	55.4	40.0	4.6	15.4
11–12 May	1,001	±3.1	KSOI	60.7	33.8	5.5	26.9
9–11 May	2,000	±2.2	Jowon C&I / Straight News	60.2	37.0	2.8	30.9
8–9 May	1,000	±3.1	Flower Research	73.6	25.1	1.3	48.5
4–8 May	2,007	±2.2	Realmeter / EKN	59.7	35.7	4.6	24.0
4–6 May	1,001	±3.1	NBS	67	23	10	44
4–5 May	1,038	±3.0	Media Tomato / News Tomato	60.0	32.8	7.2	27.2
4 May	1,010	±3.1	KIR / Cheonjiilbo	57.4	39.3	3.3	18.1
2–4 May	2,002	±2.2	Jowon C&I / Straight News	63.9	33.0	3.1	30.9
1–2 May	1,007	±3.1	Flower Research	76.5	22.6	1.0	53.9
28–30 Apr	1,002	±3.1	Gallup Korea	64	26	10	38
27–30 Apr	2,006	±2.2	Realmeter / EKN	59.5	35.0	5.5	24.5
27–28 Apr	1,005	±3.1	KIR / Cheonjiilbo	58.7	36.3	5.0	22.4
24–25 Apr	1,003	±3.1	Flower Research	75.4	22.9	1.7	52.5
20–24 Apr	2,509	±2.0	Realmeter / EKN	62.2	33.4	4.4	28.8
21–23 Apr	1,001	±3.1	Gallup Korea	67	25	8	42
20–22 Apr	1,005	±3.1	NBS	69	21	9	48
20–21 Apr	1,008	±3.1	KIR / Cheonjiilbo	60.5	35.2	4.3	25.3
20–21 Apr	1,036	±3.0	Media Tomato / News Tomato	61.4	33.0	5.6	28.4
20–21 Apr	1,004	±3.1	KSOI	62.4	32.2	5.4	30.2
18–20 Apr	2,001	±2.2	Jowon C&I / Straight News	63.1	32.9	4.0	30.2
17–18 Apr	1,003	±3.1	Flower Research	74.5	23.7	1.8	50.8
13–17 Apr	2,519	±2.0	Realmeter / EKN	65.5	30.0	4.5	35.5
14–16 Apr	1,000	±3.1	Gallup Korea	66	26	8	40
13–14 Apr	1,001	±3.1	KIR / Cheonjiilbo	62.2	33.9	3.9	28.3
12-13 Apr	1,001	±3.1	Metavoice / JTBC	67	30	3	37
10–11 Apr	1,004	±3.1	Flower Research	76.8	22.5	0.7	54.3
6–10 Apr	2,508	±2.0	Realmeter / EKN	61.9	32.8	5.3	29.1
7–9 Apr	1,002	±3.1	Gallup Korea	67	24	10	43
6–8 Apr	1,000	±3.1	NBS	69	22	9	47
6–7 Apr	1,002	±3.1	KSOI	63.4	31.1	5.5	32.3
6–7 Apr	1,035	±3.0	Media Tomato / News Tomato	67.3	26.8	5.9	40.5
6–7 Apr	1,004	±3.1	KIR / Cheonjiilbo	63.7	33.9	2.4	29.8
4–6 Apr	2,000	±2.2	Jowon C&I / Straight News	66.1	31.2	2.7	34.9
3–4 Apr	1,001	±3.1	Flower Research	73.0	25.5	1.4	47.5
30 Mar–3 Apr	2,519	±2.0	Realmeter / EKN	61.2	33.3	5.5	27.9
31 Mar–2 Apr	1,001	±3.1	Gallup Korea	67	22	11	45
30–31 Mar	1,005	±3.1	KIR / Cheonjiilbo	61.3	34.5	4.2	26.8
30–31 Mar	1,000	±3.1	Researchview	60.9	34.0	5.0	26.9
27–28 Mar	1,000	±3.1	Flower Research	77.7	20.9	1.4	56.8
23–27 Mar	2,513	±2.0	Realmeter / EKN	62.2	32.2	5.6	30.0
24–26 Mar	1,000	±3.1	Gallup Korea	65	24	10	41
23–25 Mar	1,002	±3.1	NBS	69	22	10	47
23–24 Mar	1,011	±3.1	KIR / Cheonjiilbo	60.0	35.8	4.2	24.2
23–24 Mar	1,035	±3.0	Media Tomato / News Tomato	60.3	35.2	4.6	25.1
23–24 Mar	1,003	±3.1	KSOI	62.2	32.6	5.2	28.6
21–23 Mar	2,000	±2.2	Jowon C&I / Straight News	62.9	34.0	3.0	28.9
20–21 Mar	1,004	±3.1	Flower Research	75.4	23.6	1.0	51.8
16–20 Mar	2,513	±2.0	Realmeter / EKN	62.2	32.5	5.3	29.7
17–19 Mar	1,004	±3.1	Gallup Korea	67	25	8	42
16–17 Mar	1,007	±3.1	KIR / Cheonjiilbo	61.1	35.4	3.6	25.7
13–14 Mar	1,001	±3.1	Flower Research	72.1	26.0	1.9	46.1
9–13 Mar	2,513	±2.0	Realmeter / EKN	60.3	35.0	4.7	25.3
10–12 Mar	1,002	±3.1	Gallup Korea	66	24	11	42
9–11 Mar	1,002	±3.1	NBS	67	24	9	43
9–10 Mar	1,001	±3.1	KIR / Cheonjiilbo	54.6	40.8	4.6	13.8
9–10 Mar	1,036	±3.0	Media Tomato / News Tomato	60.9	33.3	5.8	27.6
9–10 Mar	1,000	±3.1	KSOI	59.3	34.7	5.9	24.6
7–9 Mar	2,003	±2.2	Jowon C&I / Straight News	58.3	38.1	3.6	20.2
6–7 Mar	1,004	±3.1	Flower Research	73.1	24.4	2.6	48.7
3–6 Apr	2,004	±2.2	Realmeter / EKN	58.2	37.1	4.7	21.1
3–5 Mar	1,001	±3.1	Gallup Korea	65	25	10	40
2–3 Mar	1,001	±3.1	KIR / Cheonjiilbo	59.4	37.4	3.2	22.0
1–3 Mar	1,000	±3.1	Researchview	57.9	39.1	3.0	18.8
1–2 Mar	1,004	±3.1	Ace Research / Newsis	58.6	38.0	3.4	20.6
27–28 Feb	1,004	±3.1	Flower Research	76.0	22.9	1.2	53.1
23–27 Feb	2,507	±2.0	Realmeter / EKN	57.1	38.2	4.7	18.9
24–26 Feb	1,000	±3.1	Gallup Korea	64	26	10	38
23–25 Feb	1,002	±3.1	NBS	67	25	8	42
23–24 Feb	1,002	±3.1	KIR / Cheonjiilbo	59.0	37.1	3.9	21.9
23–24 Feb	1,034	±3.0	Media Tomato / News Tomato	63.3	31.3	5.4	32.0
23–24 Feb	1,005	±3.1	KSOI	57.8	37.1	5.1	20.7
21–23 Feb	2,001	±2.2	Jowon C&I / Straight News	60.1	36.2	3.7	23.9
20–21 Feb	1,005	±3.1	Flower Research	72.3	27.0	0.7	45.3
19–20 Feb	1,000	±3.1	Realmeter / EKN	58.2	37.2	4.6	21.0
12–14 Feb	1,004	±3.1	Ipsos / SBS	63	30	7	33
11–13 Feb	1,000	±3.1	Korea Research / MBC	64	30	6	34
9–13 Feb	2,524	±2.0	Realmeter / EKN	56.5	38.9	4.6	17.6
10–12 Feb	1,012	±3.1	Kstat / KBS	65	27	7	38
10–12 Feb	1,003	±3.1	Gallup Korea	63	26	11	37
9–10 Feb	1,036	±3.0	Media Tomato / News Tomato	58.4	36.6	5.1	21.8
9–10 Feb	1,006	±3.1	KIR / Cheonjiilbo	58.1	38.6	3.3	19.5
9–10 Feb	1,004	±3.1	KSOI	61.0	33.1	5.9	27.9
7–9 Feb	2,001	±2.2	Jowon C&I / Straight News	58.1	37.9	4.0	20.2
7–9 Feb	1,015	±3.1	Hangil Research / Kukinews	54.3	42.3	3.6	12.0
6–7 Feb	1,002	±3.1	Flower Research	68.6	29.6	1.8	39.0
2–6 Feb	2,507	±2.0	Realmeter / EKN	55.8	39.1	5.1	16.7
3–5 Feb	1,001	±3.1	Gallup Korea	58	29	12	29
2–4 Feb	1,003	±3.1	NBS	63	30	7	33
2–3 Feb	1,003	±3.1	KIR / Cheonjiilbo	55.4	40.5	4.1	14.9
30–31 Jan	1,006	±3.1	Flower Research	67.1	31.7	1.2	35.4
26–30 Jan	2,516	±2.0	Realmeter / EKN	54.5	40.7	4.8	13.8
27–29 Jan	1,001	±3.1	Gallup Korea	60	29	11	31
27–28 Jan	1,035	±3.0	Media Tomato / News Tomato	57.6	38.8	3.7	18.8
26–27 Jan	1,001	±3.1	KIR / Cheonjiilbo	54.5	41.8	3.7	12.7
24–26 Jan	2,002	±2.2	Jowon C&I / Straight News	56.9	40.2	2.9	16.7
23–24 Jan	1,003	±3.1	Flower Research	68.3	30.2	1.5	38.1
19–23 Jan	2,509	±2.0	Realmeter / EKN	53.1	42.1	4.8	11.0
20–22 Jan	1,000	±3.1	Gallup Korea	61	30	10	31
19–21 Jan	1,001	±3.1	NBS	59	31	10	28
19–20 Jan	1,004	±3.1	KSOI	52.0	42.1	6.0	9.9
16–17 Jan	1,004	±3.1	Flower Research	69.4	29.3	1.3	40.1
12–16 Jan	2,516	±2.0	Realmeter / EKN	53.1	42.2	4.8	10.9
13–15 Jan	1,000	±3.1	Gallup Korea	58	32	10	26
12–13 Jan	1,037	±3.0	Media Tomato / News Tomato	61.5	33.3	5.2	28.2
12–13 Jan	1,011	±3.1	KIR / Cheonjiilbo	55.3	40.5	4.2	14.8
10–12 Jan	2,001	±2.2	Jowon C&I / Straight News	55.9	40.3	3.7	15.6
10–12 Jan	1,061	±3.0	Hangil Research / Kukinews	52.6	42.7	4.6	9.9
9–10 Jan	1,004	±3.1	Flower Research	67.0	31.8	1.2	35.2
5–9 Jan	2,530	±1.9	Realmeter / EKN	56.8	37.8	5.3	19.0
6–8 Jan	1,000	±3.1	Gallup Korea	60	33	7	27
5–7 Jan	1,005	±3.1	NBS	61	29	10	32
5–6 Jan	1,004	±3.1	KIR / Cheonjiilbo	64	30	6	34
5–6 Jan	1,003	±3.1	KSOI	55.8	39.0	5.2	16.8
2–3 Jan	1,005	±3.1	Flower Research	71.2	27.7	1.1	43.5
29 Dec–2 Jan	2,025	±2.2	Realmeter / EKN	54.1	41.4	4.6	12.7

== 2025 ==
Fieldwork date	Sample size	Margin of error	Polling firm	Approve	Disapprove	Und./ no ans.	Net
30–31 Dec	1,002	±3.1	Realmeter / Ohmynews	56.0	39.9	4.1	16.1
29–31 Dec	1,022	±3.1	Kstat / KBS	59	31	10	28
29–30 Dec	1,007	±3.1	KIR / Cheonjiilbo	55.2	39.7	5.1	15.5
29–30 Dec	1,033	±3.0	Media Tomato / News Tomato	55.8	40.0	3.2	15.8
28–30 Dec	1,008	±3.1	Korea Research / MBC	63	33	5	30
28–30 Dec	1,002	±3.1	Ace Research / Newsis	52.9	44.1	3.0	8.8
28–29 Dec	1,005	±3.1	Metavoice / JTBC	62	35	2	27
27–29 Dec	2,005	±2.2	Jowon C&I / Straight News	56.0	40.0	3.9	16.0
27–29 Dec	1,023	±3.1	Hangil Research / Kukinews	51.9	44.7	3.4	7.2
27–28 Dec	1,003	±3.1	Embrain Public / News1	59	32	9	27
26–28 Dec	1,004	±3.1	Research&Research / Dong-A Ilbo	61.7	33.6	4.7	28.1
26–27 Dec	1,010	±3.1	Gallup Korea / Kyunghyang	57	35	8	22
22–26 Dec	2,009	±2.2	Realmeter / EKN	53.2	42.2	4.6	11.0
22–24 Dec	1,003	±3.1	NBS	59	32	8	27
22–23 Dec	1,001	±3.1	KSOI	51.9	42.0	6.1	9.9
20–21 Dec	1,001	±3.1	KIR / Cheonjiilbo	52.9	42.0	5.1	10.9
19–20 Dec	1,000	±3.1	EveryResearch / Medialocal	49.1	46.9	4.0	2.2
19–20 Dec	1,004	±3.1	Flower Research	69.0	29.5	1.5	39.5
16–18 Dec	1,001	±3.1	Gallup Korea	55	36	9	19
15–16 Dec	1,034	±3.0	Media Tomato / News Tomato	55.9	39.8	4.3	16.1
13–15 Dec	2,001	±2.2	Jowon C&I / Straight News	53.8	42.7	3.4	11.1
13–14 Dec	1,010	±3.1	KIR / Cheonjiilbo	51.3	44.4	4.3	6.9
12–13 Dec	1,006	±3.1	Flower Research	67.6	30.3	2.1	37.3
9–11 Dec	1,000	±3.1	Gallup Korea	56	34	9	22
8–10 Dec	1,000	±3.1	NBS	62	30	7	32
8–9 Dec	1,004	±3.1	KSOI	55.7	39.9	4.4	15.8
6–7 Dec	1,000	±3.1	KIR / Cheonjiilbo	51.6	45.6	2.8	6.0
5–6 Dec	1,000	±3.1	EveryResearch / Medialocal	52.0	43.6	4.4	8.4
5–6 Dec	1,002	±3.1	Flower Research	69.4	28.9	1.7	40.5
4–5 Dec	1,003	±3.1	Gallup Korea / The Kukmin Daily	59	35	6	24
1–5 Dec	2,520	±2.0	Realmeter / EKN	54.9	42.1	3.0	12.8
2–4 Dec	1,000	±3.1	Gallup Korea	62	29	8	33
30 Nov–1 Dec	1,010	±3.1	Kstat / MBC	63	31	6	32
29 Nov–1 Dec	2,005	±2.2	Jowon C&I / Straight News	52.7	43.8	3.5	8.9
29–30 Nov	1,000	±3.1	KIR / Cheonjiilbo	50.3	45.4	4.3	4.9
28–30 Nov	1,000	±3.1	Researchview	53.7	42.5	3.8	11.2
28–29 Nov	1,008	±3.1	Signal and Pulse / Voice of Seoul	55.7	41.8	2.5	13.9
28–29 Nov	1,002	±3.1	Flower Research	71.1	27.9	1.0	43.2
28–29 Nov	1,002	±3.1	Gallup Korea / JoongAng	62	32	6	30
24–28 Nov	2,538	±1.9	Realmeter / EKN	54.8	40.7	4.5	14.1
25–27 Nov	1,000	±3.1	Gallup Korea	60	31	9	29
24–26 Nov	1,003	±3.1	NBS	58	32	10	26
24–25 Nov	1,008	±3.1	KSOI	59.5	36.6	3.9	22.9
22–23 Nov	1,000	±3.1	EveryResearch / Medialocal	50.8	45.1	4.1	5.7
22–23 Nov	1,003	±3.1	KIR / Cheonjiilbo	51.0	45.7	3.3	5.3
21–22 Nov	1,008	±3.1	Flower Research	69.0	29.8	1.1	39.2
17–21 Nov	2,523	±2.0	Realmeter / EKN	55.9	40.5	3.6	15.4
18–20 Nov	1,000	±3.1	Gallup Korea	60	30	10	30
17–18 Nov	1,037	±3.0	Media Tomato / News Tomato	54.2	42.0	3.9	12.2
15–17 Nov	2,003	±2.2	Jowon C&I / Straight News	51.5	44.5	4.0	7.0
15–16 Nov	1,005	±3.1	KIR / Cheonjiilbo	50.7	45.0	4.3	5.7
14–15 Nov	1,006	±3.1	Flower Research	69.3	29.5	1.2	39.8
10–14 Nov	2,510	±2.0	Realmeter / EKN	54.5	41.2	4.3	13.3
11–13 Nov	1,003	±3.1	Gallup Korea	59	32	9	27
10–12 Nov	1,004	±3.1	NBS	61	29	10	32
10–11 Nov	1,002	±3.1	KSOI	55.5	39.8	4.7	15.7
8–10 Nov	1,009	±3.1	Hangil Research / Kukinews	54.4	43.4	2.3	11.0
7–8 Nov	1,000	±3.1	EveryResearch / Medialocal	54.7	41.2	4.2	13.5
7–8 Nov	1,007	±3.1	Flower Research	67.8	31.2	1.0	36.6
3–7 Nov	2,528	±1.9	Realmeter / EKN	56.7	38.7	4.6	18.0
4–6 Nov	1,002	±3.1	Gallup Korea	63	29	8	34
3–4 Nov	1,031	±3.0	Media Tomato / News Tomato	60.3	35.2	4.6	25.1
3–4 Nov	1,000	±3.1	Gongjung / PennMike	56.4	40.7	2.9	15.7
1–3 Nov	2,001	±2.2	Jowon C&I / Straight News	55.9	40.4	3.7	15.5
2–3 Nov	1,005	±3.1	KIR / Cheonjiilbo	53.6	42.1	4.3	11.5
31 Oct–1 Nov	1,004	±3.1	Flower Research	69.1	29.2	1.7	39.9
29–31 Oct	1,000	±3.1	Researchview	53.0	43.5	3.5	9.5
27–31 Oct	2,517	±2.0	Realmeter / EKN	53.0	43.3	3.8	9.7
28–30 Oct	1,002	±3.1	Gallup Korea	57	33	10	24
27–29 Oct	1,001	±3.1	NBS	56	35	10	21
27–28 Oct	1,002	±3.1	KSOI	51.5	43.6	4.9	7.9
25–27 Oct	1,011	±3.1	Hangil Research / Kukinews	51.7	44.8	3.5	6.9
24–25 Oct	1,002	±3.1	Flower Research	65.2	33.4	1.4	31.8
23–24 Oct	1,004	±3.1	Hankook Research / Korea Times	59	32	10	27
20–24 Oct	2,519	±2.0	Realmeter / EKN	51.2	44.9	3.9	6.3
21–23 Oct	1,000	±3.1	Gallup Korea	56	33	11	23
20–21 Oct	1,002	±3.1	KIR / Cheonjiilbo	50.2	46.2	3.6	4.0
18–20 Oct	2,019	±2.2	Jowon C&I / Straight News	49.4	47.4	3.2	2.0
18–19 Oct	1,000	±3.1	EveryResearch / Medialocal	50.6	45.0	4.4	5.6
17–18 Oct	1,004	±3.1	Flower Research	66.9	32.3	0.8	34.6
13–17 Oct	2,518	±2.0	Realmeter / EKN	52.2	44.9	3.0	7.3
14–16 Oct	1,001	±3.1	Gallup Korea	54	35	10	19
13–15 Oct	1,000	±3.1	NBS	56	35	9	21
13–14 Oct	1,000	±3.1	KSOI	51.3	43.8	4.9	7.5
13–14 Oct	1,007	±3.1	KIR / Cheonjiilbo	49.7	47.5	2.8	2.2
10–11 Oct	1,011	±3.1	Flower Research	64.8	34.6	0.6	30.2
7–8 Oct	1,001	±3.1	KIR / Cheonjiilbo	50.3	46.7	3.0	3.6
1–2 Oct	1,000	±3.1	Ipsos / SBS	60	36	4	24
1–2 Oct	1,000	±3.1	Korea Research / MBC	59	33	7	26
29 Sep–2 Oct	2,017	±2.2	Realmeter / EKN	53.5	43.3	3.1	10.2
29 Sep–1 Oct	1,003	±3.1	NBS	57	34	10	23
30 Sep–1 Oct	1,000	±3.1	KIR / Cheonjiilbo	50.2	47.5	2.3	2.7
29–30 Sep	1,010	±3.1	Gallup Korea / Segye Ilbo	58	35	7	23
28–30 Sep	1,000	±3.1	Researchview	50.8	43.9	5.2	6.9
28–29 Sep	1,016	±3.1	Ace Research / Newsis	50.5	47.4	2.0	3.1
27–29 Sep	1,014	±3.1	Hangil Research / Kukinews	50.1	46.4	3.5	3.7
27–29 Sep	2,002	±2.2	Jowon C&I / Straight News	50.8	46.4	2.8	4.4
26–27 Sep	1,002	±3.1	Flower Research	67.4	31.6	1.0	35.8
26–27 Sep	1,000	±3.1	KIR / Cheonjiilbo	49.3	47.3	3.4	2.0
22–26 Sep	2,527	±1.9	Realmeter / EKN	52.0	44.1	4.0	7.9
23–25 Sep	1,002	±3.1	Gallup Korea	55	34	11	21
22–23 Sep	1,033	±3.0	Media Tomato / News Tomato	57.8	37.9	4.3	19.9
22–23 Sep	1,000	±3.1	KSOI	52.2	43.3	4.4	8.9
19–20 Sep	1,000	±3.1	EveryResearch / Medialocal	48.6	47.9	3.5	0.7
19–20 Sep	1,005	±3.1	Flower Research	69.9	28.2	1.9	41.7
19–20 Sep	1,001	±3.1	KIR / Cheonjiilbo	52.8	44.1	3.1	8.7
15–19 Sep	2,526	±1.9	Realmeter / EKN	53.0	43.6	3.4	9.4
16–18 Sep	1,001	±3.1	Gallup Korea	60	31	9	29
15–17 Sep	1,002	±3.1	NBS	59	31	11	28
13–15 Sep	2,000	±2.2	Jowon C&I / Straight News	54.7	42.1	3.2	12.6
12–13 Sep	1,003	±3.1	Flower Research	69.1	29.4	1.5	39.7
8–12 Sep	2,515	±2.0	Realmeter / EKN	54.5	41.1	4.4	13.4
9–11 Sep	1,002	±3.1	Gallup Korea	58	34	8	24
9–10 Sep	1,003	±3.1	Korea Research / MBC	63	28	9	35
9–10 Sep	1,001	±3.1	KIR / Cheonjiilbo	51.9	44.2	3.9	7.7
8–10 Sep	1,000	±3.1	Hankook Research / KBS	66	29	5	37
8–9 Sep	1,037	±3.0	Media Tomato / News Tomato	57.8	37.6	4.6	20.2
8–9 Sep	1,002	±3.1	KSOI	54.6	40.3	5.1	14.3
5–6 Sep	1,000	±3.1	EveryResearch / Medialocal	49.6	45.7	4.6	3.9
5–6 Sep	1,001	±3.1	Flower Research	69.5	28.7	1.8	40.8
5–6 Sep	1,009	±3.1	KIR / Cheonjiilbo	55.4	41.5	3.1	13.9
1–5 Sep	2,519	±2.0	Realmeter / EKN	56.0	39.2	4.8	16.8
2–4 Sep	1,002	±3.1	Gallup Korea	63	28	9	35
1–3 Sep	1,005	±3.1	NBS	62	28	10	34
1–2 Sep	1,000	±3.1	Gongjung / PennMike	52.2	44.3	3.5	7.9
30 Aug–1 Sep	2,003	±2.2	Jowon C&I / Straight News	51.1	45.5	3.4	5.6
30 Aug–1 Sep	1,010	±3.1	Hangil Research / Kukinews	52.5	43.9	3.5	8.6
29–31 Aug	1,000	±3.1	Researchview	53.1	43.9	3.0	9.2
29–30 Aug	1,008	±3.1	Flower Research	67.3	31.0	1.7	36.3
29–30 Aug	1,000	±3.1	KIR / Cheonjiilbo	51.3	43.9	4.8	7.4
25–29 Aug	2,537	±1.9	Realmeter / EKN	53.6	42.3	4.1	11.3
27–28 Aug	1,002	±3.1	KSOI	57.6	38.0	4.4	19.6
26–28 Aug	1,000	±3.1	Gallup Korea	59	30	11	29
25–26 Aug	1,031	±3.1	Media Tomato / News Tomato	48.3	48.8	3.0	0.5
22–23 Aug	1,000	±3.1	EveryResearch / Medialocal	45.6	50.9	3.4	5.3
22–23 Aug	1,005	±3.1	Flower Research	64.2	34.3	1.5	29.9
18–22 Aug	2,512	±2.2	Realmeter / EKN	51.4	44.9	3.7	6.5
19–21 Aug	1,004	±3.1	Gallup Korea	56	35	9	21
18–20 Aug	1,001	±3.1	NBS	57	33	9	24
18–19 Aug	1,001	±3.1	KIR / Cheonjiilbo	51.0	45.7	3.3	5.3
16–18 Aug	2,000	±2.2	Jowon C&I / Straight News	52.3	44.3	3.4	8.0
15–16 Aug	1,007	±3.1	Flower Research	68.0	30.9	1.1	37.1
12–14 Aug	1,007	±3.1	Gallup Korea	59	30	11	29
11–14 Aug	2,003	±2.2	Realmeter / EKN	51.1	44.5	4.5	6.6
11–12 Aug	1,037	±3.0	Media Tomato / News Tomato	52.8	41.8	5.4	11.0
11–12 Aug	1,006	±3.1	KSOI	54.7	39.5	5.8	15.2
11–12 Aug	1,002	±3.1	KIR / Cheonjiilbo	52.1	43.3	4.6	8.8
8–9 Aug	1,001	±3.1	Flower Research	71.3	27.7	1.0	43.6
4–8 Aug	2,506	±2.0	Realmeter / EKN	56.5	38.2	5.2	18.3
4–6 Aug	1,001	±3.1	NBS	65	24	11	41
4–5 Aug	1,005	±3.1	KIR / Cheonjiilbo	61.2	34.5	4.3	26.7
2–4 Aug	2,018	±2.2	Jowon C&I / Straight News	56.6	39.2	4.2	17.4
2–4 Aug	1,000	±3.1	EveryResearch / Medialocal	55.9	39.3	4.8	16.6
1–2 Aug	1,009	±3.1	Flower Research	71.6	26.1	2.3	45.5
28 Jul–1 Aug	2,520	±2.0	Realmeter / EKN	63.3	31.4	5.3	31.9
29–31 Jul	1,000	±3.1	Researchview	59.4	36.8	3.9	22.6
29–30 Jul	1,003	±3.1	KIR / Cheonjiilbo	60.4	34.2	5.4	26.2
28–29 Jul	1,036	±3.0	Media Tomato / News Tomato	58.3	37.5	4.2	20.8
28–29 Jul	1,002	±3.1	KSOI	58.8	35.5	5.7	23.3
27–28 Jul	1,002	±3.1	Ace Research / Newsis	61.2	35.5	3.3	25.7
26–27 Jul	1,509	±2.5	Gongjung / PennMike	60.0	36.2	3.8	23.8
25–26 Jul	1,007	±3.1	Flower Research	76.2	21.6	2.2	54.6
21–25 Jul	2,508	±2.0	Realmeter / EKN	61.5	33.0	5.5	28.5
22–23 Jul	1,003	±3.1	KIR / Cheonjiilbo	59.6	35.4	5.0	24.2
21–23 Jul	1,001	±3.1	NBS	64	22	14	42
21–22 Jul	1,038	±3.0	Media Tomato / News Tomato	60.0	34.2	5.8	25.8
19–21 Jul	2,002	±2.2	Jowon C&I / Straight News	60.7	34.5	4.7	26.2
18–19 Jul	1,007	±3.1	Flower Research	76.2	21.9	1.8	54.3
14–18 Jul	2,514	±2.0	Realmeter / EKN	62.2	32.3	5.5	29.9
16–17 Jul	1,003	±3.1	KIR / Cheonjiilbo	60.7	31.7	7.6	29.0
15–17 Jul	1,000	±3.1	Gallup Korea	64	23	12	41
14–15 Jul	1,000	±3.1	KSOI	61.6	32.9	5.5	28.7
12–14 Jul	1,008	±3.1	Hangil Research / Kukinews	64.2	31.6	4.2	32.6
11–12 Jul	1,000	±3.1	EveryResearch / Medialocal	59.1	37.4	3.6	21.7
11–12 Jul	1,003	±3.1	Flower Research	74.7	22.7	2.6	52.0
10–11 Jul	1,001	±3.1	KIR / Cheonjiilbo	64.0	30.5	5.5	33.5
7–11 Jul	2,513	±2.0	Realmeter / EKN	64.6	30.0	5.4	34.6
8–10 Jul	1,002	±3.1	Gallup Korea	63	23	14	40
7–9 Jul	1,003	±3.1	NBS	65	23	12	42
8 Jul	1,009	±3.1	Hangil Research / Polinews	62.7	33.0	4.3	29.7
7–8 Jul	1,042	±3.0	Media Tomato / News Tomato	60.2	34.2	5.6	26.0
7–8 Jul	1,006	±3.1	KIR / Cheonjiilbo	62.3	32.3	5.4	30.0
5–7 Jul	2,007	±2.2	Jowon C&I / Straight News	62.6	33.9	3.5	28.7
4–5 Jul	1,007	±3.1	Flower Research	73.6	23.4	2.9	50.2
30 Jun–4 Jul	2,508	±2.0	Realmeter / EKN	62.1	31.4	6.5	30.7
1–3 Jul	1,001	±3.1	Gallup Korea	65	23	12	42
30 Jun–1 Jul	1,002	±3.1	KSOI / CBS	59.3	34.6	6.2	24.7
28–30 Jun	1,000	±3.1	Researchview / KPI News	61.1	34.1	4.8	27.0
27–28 Jun	1,000	±3.1	EveryResearch / Medialocal	58.4	36.0	5.6	22.4
27–28 Jun	1,008	±3.1	Flower Research	72.8	24.2	3.0	48.6
23–27 Jun	2,511	±2.0	Realmeter / EKN	59.7	33.6	6.8	26.1
24–26 Jun	1,004	±3.1	Gallup Korea	64	21	15	43
25 Jun	1,034	±3.0	Hangil Research / Polinews	60.1	34.5	5.4	25.6
23–25 Jun	1,000	±3.1	NBS	62	21	17	41
23–24 Jun	1,042	±3.0	Media Tomato / News Tomato	56.9	36.4	6.7	20.5
20–21 Jun	1,006	±3.1	Flower Research	73.4	23.6	3.1	49.8
16–20 Jun	2,514	±2.0	Realmeter / EKN	59.3	33.5	7.2	25.8
17–18 Jun	1,006	±3.1	KIR / Cheonjiilbo	59.6	33.0	7.4	26.6
14-16 Jun	1,008	±3.1	Hangil Research / Kukinews	56.5	33.5	10.0	23.0
12–13 Jun	1,003	±3.1	KIR / Cheonjiilbo	59.7	33.5	6.8	26.2
9–13 Jun	2,507	±2.0	Realmeter / EKN	58.6	34.2	7.2	24.4
10–12 Jun	1,000	±3.1	Gallup Korea	70	24	6	46
10–11 Jun	1,004	±3.1	KIR / Cheonjiilbo	60.2	33.9	5.9	26.3
9–11 Jun	1,001	±3.1	NBS	53	19	28	34
9–10 Jun	1,045	±3.0	Media Tomato / News Tomato	60.4	31.4	8.3	29.0

== See also ==
- Opinion polling for the 2025 South Korean presidential election
- Opinion polling for the 2028 South Korean legislative election
- Opinion polling on the Yoon Suk Yeol presidency
- List of heads of the executive by approval rating
