= Opinion polling on the Yoon Suk Yeol presidency =

Yoon Suk Yeol was inaugurated on 10 May 2022, as president of South Korea.

The following articles are lists of opinion pollings on his presidency. For more information, visit the National Election Survey Deliberation Committee of Korea.

Yoon was impeached and removed from office by the Constitutional Court on April 4, 2025. After the National Assembly voted to impeach Yoon in December 2024 and removed his powers entirely, several polling firms stopped all polling on Yoon's presidency.

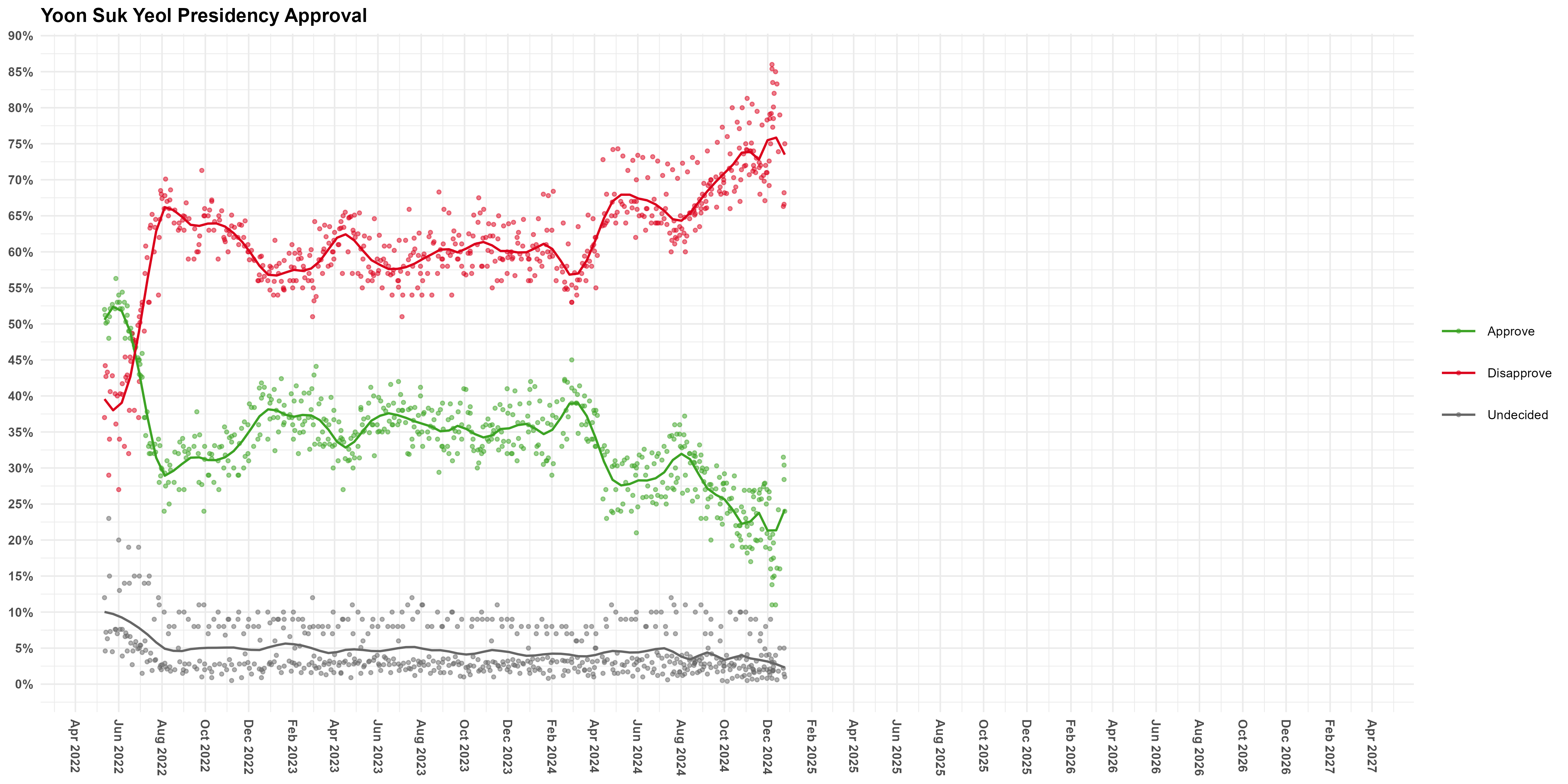
Local regression curve of opinion polling

== 2024 ==
Fieldwork date	Sample size	Margin of error	Polling firm	Approve	Disapprove	Und./ no ans.	Net
29–30 Dec	1,008	±3.1	KIR / Cheonjiilbo	36.1	61.6	2.3	25.5
25 Dec	1,030	±3.1	Research&Research / Pennmike	24	75	1	51
23–24 Dec	1,000	±3.1	KIR / Cheonjiilbo	28.4	66.6	5.0	38.2
23–24 Dec	1,013	±3.1	Gongjung / Dailian	30.4	68.2	1.4	37.8
22–23 Dec	1,004	±3.1	Gongjung / Pennmike	31.5	66.3	2.2	34.8
16–18 Dec	1,002	±3.1	NBS (Note: Embrain Public, KStat Research, Korea Research, Hankook Research)	16	79	5	63
14–16 Dec	2,002	±2.2	Jowon C&I / Straight News	24.2	73.9	1.8	49.7
14 Dec	Impeached by the National Assembly						
13–14 Dec	1,011	±3.1	Flower Research	16.1	83.3	0.6	67.2
10–12 Dec	1,002	±3.1	Gallup Korea	11	85	4	74
10 Dec	1,005	±3.1	Embrain Public / News1	15	82	3	67
9 Dec	1,001	±3.1	Gongjung / Dailian	17.5	80.1	2.4	62.6
7–9 Dec	2,002	±2.2	Jowon C&I / Straight News	19.6	78.5	1.9	58.9
8 Dec	1,000	±3.1	Researchview / KPI News	14.8	83.5	1.8	68.7
7–8 Dec	1,002	±3.1	Jowon C&I / Hanyangeconomy	20.8	77.3	1.9	56.5
6–7 Dec	1,014	±3.1	Gallup Korea / Kukminilbo	11	86	3	75
6–7 Dec	1,004	±3.1	Flower Research	13.8	85.4	0.8	71.6
5–6 Dec	1,012	±3.1	Realmeter / EKN	17.3	79.2	3.5	61.9
3–5 Dec	1,001	±3.1	Gallup Korea	16	75	9	59
4 Dec	1,503	±2.5	Media Tomato / News Tomato	18.8	79.1	2.1	60.3
4 Dec	1,047	±3.0	Media Research / Newspim	20.3	78.5	1.3	58.2
3 Dec	2024 South Korean martial law crisis						
2–3 Dec	1,008	±3.1	Media Tomato / News Tomato	25.8	72.6	1.7	46.8
1–3 Dec	1,002	±3.1	EveryResearch / EveryNews	26.7	69.2	4.1	42.5
29–30 Nov	1,001	±3.1	Flower Research	20.9	78.3	0.8	57.4
28–30 Nov	1,000	±3.1	Researchview	27	71	2	44
25–29 Nov	2,509	±2.0	Realmeter / EKN	25.0	71.0	4.0	46.0
26–28 Nov	1,001	±3.1	Gallup Korea	19	72	8	53
26–27 Nov	1,001	±3.1	KSOI / CBS	27.9	67.1	4.9	39.2
25–26 Nov	1,000	±3.1	Media Research / Newspim	27.8	69.8	2.4	42.0
23–25 Nov	2,001	±2.2	Jowon C&I / Straight News	27.4	70.6	2.0	43.2
22–23 Nov	1,001	±3.1	Flower Research	21.5	77.6	0.9	56.1
18–22 Nov	2,508	±2.0	Realmeter / EKN	25.7	70.3	4.0	44.6
19–21 Nov	1,001	±3.1	Gallup Korea	20	72	7	52
18–20 Nov	1,002	±3.1	NBS	27	68	6	41
18–19 Nov	1,018	±3.1	Media Tomato / News Tomato	25.6	72.4	2.0	46.8
18–19 Nov	1,000	±3.1	Gongjung / Dailian	26.5	71.7	1.7	45.2
15–16 Nov	1,004	±3.1	Flower Research	19.9	79.5	0.6	59.6
11–15 Nov	2,505	±2.0	Realmeter / EKN	23.7	73.0	3.2	49.3
12–14 Nov	1,002	±3.1	Gallup Korea	20	71	9	51
11–12 Nov	1,002	±3.1	Media Research / Newspim	26.9	71.5	1.6	44.6
10–11 Nov	1,010	±3.1	Ace Research / Newsis	26.0	72.0	2.0	46.0
9–11 Nov	2,000	±2.2	Jowon C&I / Straight News	24.3	74.0	1.7	49.7
8–10 Nov	1,000	±3.1	EveryResearch / EveryNews	26.7	71.2	2.1	44.5
8–9 Nov	1,005	±3.1	Flower Research	18.8	80.5	0.7	61.7
4–8 Nov	2,516	±2.0	Realmeter / EKN	22.3	75.1	2.6	52.8
5–7 Nov	1,002	±3.1	Gallup Korea	17	74	9	57
4–6 Nov	1,002	±3.1	NBS	19	74	7	55
4–5 Nov	1,010	±3.1	Media Tomato / News Tomato	20.7	77.9	1.3	57.2
4–5 Nov	1,000	±3.1	Gongjung / Dailian	26.9	70.7	2.4	43.8
1–2 Nov	1,002	±3.1	KSOI / Ohmynews	21.9	74.1	4.1	52.2
1–2 Nov	1,010	±3.1	Flower Research	18.2	81.3	0.5	63.1
28 Oct – 1 Nov	2,516	±2.0	Realmeter / EKN	22.4	74.2	3.4	51.8
29–31 Oct	1,000	±3.1	Researchview	23	75	2	52
29–31 Oct	1,005	±3.1	Gallup Korea	19	72	10	53
28–29 Oct	1,001	±3.1	Media Research / Newspim	26.9	71.9	1.2	45.0
26–28 Oct	2,000	±2.2	Jowon C&I / Straight News	23.9	73.6	2.5	49.7
25–26 Oct	1,003	±3.1	Flower Research	19.0	80.0	1.0	61.0
21–25 Oct	2,510	±2.0	Realmeter / EKN	24.6	71.4	3.9	46.8
22–24 Oct	1,001	±3.1	Gallup Korea	20	70	10	50
21–23 Oct	1,000	±3.1	NBS	22	67	10	45
22 Oct	1,004	±3.1	Gongjung / Dailian	22.0	74.4	3.6	52.4
21–22 Oct	1,012	±3.1	Media Tomato / News Tomato	20.6	77.1	2.2	56.5
18–19 Oct	1,005	±3.1	Flower Research	20.9	78.0	1.1	57.1
14–18 Oct	2,510	±2.0	Realmeter / EKN	24.1	72.3	3.6	48.2
15–17 Oct	1,001	±3.1	Gallup Korea	22	69	9	47
14–15 Oct	1,000	±3.1	Media Research / Newspim	28.9	68.4	2.7	39.5
12–14 Oct	2,002	±2.2	Jowon C&I / Straight News	27.2	70.3	2.5	43.1
11–12 Oct	1,003	±3.1	Flower Research	19.2	80.0	0.8	60.8
7–11 Oct	2,009	±2.2	Realmeter / EKN	25.8	71.3	2.9	45.5
8–9 Oct	1,004	±3.1	Media Tomato / News Tomato	24.4	73.6	2.0	49.2
7–9 Oct	1,000	±3.1	NBS	24	66	10	42
7–8 Oct	1,000	±3.1	Gongjung / Dailian	25.7	71.6	2.6	45.9
4–5 Oct	1,007	±3.1	Flower Research	23.7	76.0	0.4	52.3
30 Sep – 4 Oct	1,504	±2.5	Realmeter / EKN	27.9	68.1	4.0	40.2
30 Sep – 1 Oct	1,003	±3.1	Media Research / Newspim	29.2	68.2	2.5	39.0
28–30 Sep	1,000	±3.1	Researchview	27	70	3	43
28–30 Sep	2,001	±2.2	Jowon C&I / Straight News	27.9	69.6	2.5	41.7
28–29 Sep	1,002	±3.1	Ace Research / Newsis	27.8	70.5	1.8	42.7
27–28 Sep	1,000	±3.1	Flower Research	22.2	77.3	0.5	55.1
23–27 Sep	2,507	±2.0	Realmeter / EKN	25.8	70.8	3.4	45.0
24–26 Sep	1,001	±3.1	Gallup Korea	23	68	8	45
23–25 Sep	1,005	±3.1	NBS	25	69	6	44
23–24 Sep	1,005	±3.1	Gongjung / Dailian	28.7	68.4	2.9	39.7
20–21 Sep	1,010	±3.1	Flower Research	23.1	75.2	1.7	52.1
19–20 Sep	1,001	±3.1	Realmeter / EKN	30.3	66.2	3.6	35.9
18–19 Sep	1,000	±3.1	Media Research / Newspim	27.1	70.4	2.4	43.3
9–13 Sep	2,503	±2.0	Realmeter / EKN	27.0	68.7	4.2	41.7
11–12 Sep	1,002	±3.1	Korea Research / MBC	26	68	7	42
10–12 Sep	1,002	±3.1	Gallup Korea	20	70	9	50
10–12 Sep	2,004	±2.2	Jowon C&I / Straight News	27.7	70.0	2.3	42.3
10 Sep	1,002	±3.1	Gongjung / Dailian	27.7	69.5	2.8	41.8
7–8 Sep	1,000	±3.1	EveryResearch / Newsspirit	25.7	69.2	5.0	43.5
6–7 Sep	1,003	±3.1	Flower Research	24.6	74.0	1.4	49.4
2–6 Sep	2,508	±2.0	Realmeter / EKN	29.9	66.1	4.1	36.2
3–5 Sep	1,001	±3.1	Gallup Korea	23	67	10	44
2–4 Sep	1,001	±3.1	NBS	27	66	7	39
2–3 Sep	1,000	±3.1	Media Research / Newspim	29.4	67.8	2.8	38.4
31 Aug – 2 Sep	2,003	±2.2	Jowon C&I / Straight News	28.1	69.5	2.4	41.4
29–31 Aug	1,000	±3.1	Researchview	30	68	2	38
26–30 Aug	2,513	±2.0	Realmeter / EKN	29.6	66.7	3.6	37.1
28–29 Aug	1,001	±3.1	KIR / Cheonjiilbo	31.8	65.4	2.8	33.6
27–29 Aug	1,002	±3.1	Gallup Korea	23	66	11	43
26–27 Aug	1,009	±3.1	Media Tomato / News Tomato	30.9	67.3	1.8	36.4
26–27 Aug	1,002	±3.1	Gongjung / Dailian	33.2	63.5	3.3	30.3
23–24 Aug	1,010	±3.1	Flower Research	26.0	72.4	1.6	46.4
19–23 Aug	2,506	±2.0	Realmeter / EKN	30.0	66.4	3.6	36.4
20–22 Jul	1,000	±3.1	Gallup Korea	27	63	11	36
19–21 Aug	1,002	±3.1	NBS	27	63	10	36
20–21 Aug	1,004	±3.1	KOPRA / Kihoilbo	31.6	65.3	3.1	33.7
19–20 Aug	1,008	±3.1	Media Tomato / News Tomato	30.7	66.4	2.9	35.7
19–20 Aug	1,000	±3.1	Media Research / Newspim	32.1	65.1	2.9	33.0
17–19 Aug	1,025	±3.1	Hangil Research / Kukinews	30.8	65.9	3.4	35.1
17–19 Aug	2,006	±2.2	Jowon C&I / Straight News	31.7	65.7	2.6	34.0
16–17 Aug	1,004	±3.1	Flower Research	25.4	73.1	1.5	47.7
12–14 Aug	2,009	±2.2	Realmeter / EKN	30.7	65.4	3.8	34.7
12–13 Aug	1,007	±3.1	Media Tomato / News Tomato	32.0	65.4	2.6	33.4
12–13 Aug	1,006	±3.1	Gongjung / Dailian	32.0	64.6	3.3	32.6
9–10 Aug	1,009	±3.1	Flower Research	26.9	71.1	2.0	44.2
5–9 Aug	2,505	±2.0	Realmeter / EKN	33.6	62.2	4.2	28.6
5–7 Aug	1,001	±3.1	NBS	29	60	11	31
5–6 Aug	1,011	±3.1	Media Tomato / News Tomato	33.0	64.8	2.2	31.8
5–6 Aug	1,001	±3.1	Media Research / Newspim	37.2	61.4	1.4	24.2
3–5 Aug	2,002	±2.2	Jowon C&I / Straight News	34.6	62.6	2.7	28.0
2–3 Aug	1,005	±3.1	Flower Research	26.5	72.3	1.2	45.8
29 Jul – 2 Aug	2,510	±2.0	Realmeter / EKN	32.8	63.2	4.0	30.4
29–31 Jul	1,000	±3.1	Researchview	33	65	3	32
29–30 Jul	1,009	±3.1	Media Tomato / News Tomato	34.7	63.5	1.7	28.8
29–30 Jul	1,005	±3.1	Gongjung / Dailian	36.0	62.3	1.7	26.3
26–27 Jul	1,003	±3.1	Flower Research	28.6	70.2	1.2	41.6
22–26 Jul	2,508	±2.0	Realmeter / EKN	34.7	61.8	3.5	27.1
23–25 Jul	1,001	±3.1	Gallup Korea	28	63	10	35
22–24 Jul	1,005	±3.1	NBS	30	62	7	32
22–23 Jul	1,020	±3.1	Media Tomato / News Tomato	36.0	61.1	2.9	25.1
20–22 Jul	4,029	±1.5	Jowon C&I / Straight News	34.0	64.3	1.7	30.3
19–20 Jul	1,002	±3.1	Flower Research	27.2	71.4	1.4	44.2
15–19 Jul	2,506	±2.0	Realmeter / EKN	34.5	61.6	3.9	27.1
16–18 Jul	1,000	±3.1	Gallup Korea	29	60	12	31
15–16 Jul	1,008	±3.1	Media Tomato / News Tomato	34.4	62.6	3.1	28.2
12–13 Jul	1,008	±3.1	Flower Research	27.2	72.2	0.6	45.0
8–12 Jul	2,502	±2.0	Realmeter / EKN	32.3	63.8	3.9	31.5
9–11 Jul	1,000	±3.1	Gallup Korea	25	68	7	43
8–10 Jul	1,000	±3.1	NBS	26	66	8	40
6–8 Jul	2,008	±2.2	Jowon C&I / Straight News	33.0	64.6	2.5	31.6
5–6 Jul	1,002	±3.1	Flower Research	28.0	70.6	1.4	42.6
1–5 Jul	2,505	±2.0	Realmeter / EKN	31.1	65.3	3.6	34.2
2–4 Jul	1,002	±3.1	Gallup Korea	26	64	10	38
28–30 Jun	1,000	±3.1	Researchview	32	64	4	32
28–29 Jun	1,010	±3.1	Flower Research	26.2	72.6	1.2	46.4
24–28 Jun	2,511	±2.0	Realmeter / EKN	31.6	64.0	4.4	32.4
25–27 Jun	1,002	±3.1	Gallup Korea	25	66	10	41
24–26 Jun	1,007	±3.1	NBS	27	64	8	37
22–24 Jun	2,006	±2.2	Jowon C&I / Straight News	30.6	67.3	2.1	36.7
21–22 Jun	1,001	±3.1	Flower Research	25.2	73.2	1.6	48.0
17–21 Jun	2,508	±2.0	Realmeter / EKN	32.1	65.0	3.0	32.9
18–20 Jun	1,002	±3.1	Gallup Korea	26	64	10	38
14–15 Jun	1,001	±3.1	Flower Research	27.5	70.3	2.2	42.8
10–14 Jun	2,504	±2.0	Realmeter / EKN	30.1	66.0	3.9	35.9
11–13 Jun	1,000	±3.1	Gallup Korea	26	66	8	40
10–12 Jun	1,005	±3.1	NBS	29	63	8	34
9–10 Jun	2,005	±2.2	Jowon C&I / Straight News	32.6	64.9	2.5	32.3
7–8 Jun	1,009	±3.1	Flower Research	25.9	73.1	1.0	47.2
3–7 Jun	2,003	±2.2	Realmeter / EKN	31.5	65.1	3.4	33.6
1–3 Jun	2,005	±2.2	Jowon C&I / Straight News	31.8	65.0	3.3	33.2
31 May – 1 Jun	1,004	±3.1	Flower Research	24.6	73.4	2.0	48.8
27–31 May	2,513	±2.0	Realmeter / EKN	30.6	65.9	3.5	35.3
28–30 May	1,000	±3.1	Researchview	30	67	3	37
28–30 May	1,001	±3.1	Gallup Korea	21	70	10	49
27–29 May	1,004	±3.1	NBS	29	62	9	33
25–27 May	2,004	±2.2	Jowon C&I / Straight News	30.3	67.0	2.7	36.7
24–25 May	1,007	±3.1	Flower Research	26.2	72.7	1.1	46.5
20–24 May	2,506	±2.0	Realmeter / EKN	30.3	66.1	3.6	35.8
21–23 May	1,001	±3.1	Gallup Korea	24	67	9	43
17–18 May	1,008	±3.1	Flower Research	27.0	71.3	1.7	44.3
13–17 May	2,002	±2.2	Realmeter / EKN	31.4	65.5	3.1	34.1
13–15 May	1,001	±3.1	NBS	28	64	9	36
11–13 May	2,002	±2.2	Jowon C&I / Straight News	31.1	66.3	2.6	35.2
10–11 May	1,004	±3.1	Flower Research	25.0	73.3	1.7	48.3
7–10 May	2,011	±2.2	Realmeter / EKN	30.6	66.6	2.7	36.0
7–8 May	1,000	±3.1	Gallup Korea	24	67	9	43
6–7 May	1,003	±3.1	Gongjung / Dailian	32.7	64.5	2.8	31.8
3–4 May	1,008	±3.1	Flower Research	24.2	74.3	1.5	50.1
29 Apr – 3 May	2,004	±2.2	Realmeter / EKN	30.3	65.5	4.3	35.2
29 Apr – 1 May	1,000	±3.1	NBS	27	64	10	37
28–30 Apr	1,000	±3.1	Researchview	31	65	3	34
27–29 Apr	2,006	±2.2	Jowon C&I / Straight News	30.4	68.0	1.5	37.6
26–27 Apr	1,008	±3.1	Flower Research	23.8	74.2	2.0	50.4
22–26 Apr	2,518	±2.0	Realmeter / EKN	30.2	66.9	2.8	36.7
23–25 Apr	1,001	±3.1	Gallup Korea	24	65	11	41
15–19 Apr	2,509	±2.0	Realmeter / EKN	32.3	64.3	3.4	32.0
15–17 Apr	1,004	±3.1	NBS	27	64	9	37
16–18 Apr	1,000	±3.1	Gallup Korea	23	68	8	45
13–15 Apr	1,004	±3.1	Hangil Research / Kukinews	33.1	63.7	3.2	30.6
13–15 Apr	2,013	±2.2	Jowon C&I / Straight News	31.8	65.3	3.0	33.5
12–13 Apr	1,015	±3.1	Flower Research	25.7	72.8	1.5	47.1
8–12 Apr	2,010	±2.2	Realmeter / EKN	32.6	63.6	3.8	31.0
1–5 Apr	2,511	±2.0	Realmeter / EKN	37.3	59.5	3.2	22.2
2–3 Apr	1,002	±3.1	Korea Research / MBC	33	62	5	29
1–3 Apr	1,004	±3.1	NBS	38	55	7	17
1–2 Apr	1,001	±3.1	Gongjung / Dailian	39.3	58.6	2.2	19.3
30 Mar – 2 Apr	5,000	±1.4	Hankook Research / KBS	33	62	5	29
30 Mar – 1 Apr	2,033	±2.2	Jowon C&I / Straight News	37.6	60.1	2.3	22.5
30–31 Mar	1,000	±3.1	Metrix / Yonhapnews	34	61	5	27
29–31 Mar	1,000	±3.1	Researchview	38	61	1	23
29–30 Mar	1,005	±3.1	Flower Research	34.0	64.6	1.4	30.6
28–29 Mar	1,011	±3.1	Gallup Korea / Sedaily	34	62	4	28
25–29 Mar	2,509	±2.0	Realmeter / EKN	36.3	60.7	3.1	24.4
26–28 Mar	1,001	±3.1	Gallup Korea	34	58	8	24
23–25 Mar	2,015	±2.2	Jowon C&I / Straight News	39.3	58.7	2.0	19.4
22–23 Mar	1,009	±3.1	Flower Research	33.7	65.1	1.2	31.4
18–22 Mar	2,509	±2.0	Realmeter / EKN	36.5	60.1	3.4	23.6
19–21 Mar	1,001	±3.1	Gallup Korea	34	58	7	24
18–20 Mar	1,001	±3.1	NBS	36	56	8	20
18–19 Mar	1,001	±3.1	Gongjung / Dailian	36.7	60.9	2.3	24.2
16–18 Mar	1,008	±3.1	Hangil Research / Kukinews	38.6	59.4	2.0	20.8
16–18 Mar	2,027	±2.2	Jowon C&I / Straight News	40.0	58.1	1.9	18.1
11–15 Mar	2,504	±2.0	Realmeter / EKN	38.6	58.4	3.0	19.8
12–14 Mar	1,002	±3.1	Gallup Korea	36	57	6	21
9–11 Mar	2,000	±2.2	Jowon C&I / Straight News	41.4	56.1	2.5	14.7
8–9 Mar	1,013	±3.1	Flower Research	34.8	63.5	1.7	28.7
4–8 Mar	2,551	±2.0	Realmeter / EKN	40.2	56.1	3.7	15.9
5–7 Mar	1,000	±3.1	Gallup Korea	39	54	6	15
4–6 Mar	1,000	±3.1	NBS	39	55	6	16
4–5 Mar	1,000	±3.1	Gongjung / Dailian	41.6	56.0	2.4	14.4
2–4 Mar	2,013	±2.2	Jowon C&I / Straight News	40.7	57.1	2.2	16.4
2–3 Mar	1,000	±3.1	Metrix / Yonhapnews	39	56	5	17
27–29 Feb	1,000	±3.1	Researchview	45	53	3	8
27–29 Feb	1,001	±3.1	Gallup Korea	39	53	7	14
26–29 Feb	2,006	±2.2	Realmeter / EKN	41.1	55.4	3.5	14.3
23–24 Feb	1,017	±3.1	Flower Research	37.1	61.1	1.8	24.0
22–23 Feb	1,015	±3.1	Gallup Korea / Sedaily	38	59	3	21
19–23 Feb	2,504	±2.0	Realmeter / EKN	41.9	54.8	3.2	12.9
20–22 Feb	1,003	±3.1	Gallup Korea	34	58	7	24
19–21 Feb	1,005	±3.1	NBS	38	55	8	17
19–20 Feb	1,001	±3.1	Gongjung / Dailian	45.1	52.3	2.6	7.2
17–19 Feb	1,005	±3.1	Hangil Research / Kukinews	42.1	54.8	3.2	12.7
17–19 Feb	2,005	±2.2	Jowon C&I / Straight News	42.3	55.8	1.9	13.5
16–17 Feb	1,007	±3.1	Flower Research	34.8	64.0	1.2	29.2
13–16 Feb	2,011	±2.2	Realmeter / EKN	39.5	57.2	3.3	17.7
13–15 Feb	1,002	±3.1	Gallup Korea	33	58	8	25
5–8 Feb	2,011	±2.2	Realmeter / EKN	39.2	57.7	3.1	18.5
5–7 Feb	1,002	±3.1	NBS	37	56	7	19
5–6 Feb	1,001	±3.1	Gongjung / Dailian	44.6	53.6	1.7	9.0
3–4 Feb	1,000	±3.1	Metrix / Yonhapnews	34	59	7	25
2–3 Feb	1,011	±3.1	Flower Research	30.6	68.4	1.0	37.8
29 Jan – 2 Feb	2,507	±2.0	Realmeter / EKN	37.3	59.4	3.3	22.1
30 Jan – 1 Feb	1,000	±3.1	Gallup Korea	29	63	8	34
29–31 Jan	1,000	±3.1	Researchview	36	60	3	24
27–29 Jan	2,006	±2.2	Jowon C&I / Straight News	38.7	59.3	1.9	20.6
26–27 Jan	1,018	±3.1	Flower Research	31.4	67.8	0.8	36.4
25–26 Jan	1,011	±3.1	Gallup Korea / Sedaily	34	62	5	28
22–26 Jan	2,506	±2.0	Realmeter / EKN	36.2	60.0	3.7	23.8
23–25 Jan	1,001	±3.1	Gallup Korea	31	63	7	32
22–24 Jan	1,001	±3.1	NBS	31	61	8	30
22–23 Jan	1,004	±3.1	Gongjung / Dailian	37.8	59.5	2.8	21.7
19–20 Jan	1,017	±3.1	Flower Research	30.5	68.0	1.5	37.5
15–19 Jan	2,507	±2.0	Realmeter / EKN	36.8	59.8	3.5	33.0
16–18 Jan	1,002	±3.1	Gallup Korea	32	58	9	26
13–15 Jan	2,002	±2.2	Jowon C&I / Straight News	39.3	58.7	2.0	19.4
12–13 Jan	1,009	±3.1	Flower Research	33.2	64.6	2.2	31.4
8–12 Jan	2,508	±2.0	Realmeter / EKN	36.3	60.3	3.4	24.0
9–11 Jan	1,002	±3.1	Gallup Korea	33	59	8	26
8–10 Jan	1,001	±3.1	NBS	32	61	7	29
8–9 Jan	1,002	±3.1	Gongjung / Dailian	40.2	57.6	2.3	17.4
6–8 Jan	1,007	±3.1	Hangil Research / Kukinews	41.3	56.7	1.9	15.4
6–7 Jan	1,000	±3.1	Metrix / Yonhapnews	35	59	6	24
5–6 Jan	1,015	±3.1	Flower Research	35.2	62.4	2.4	27.2
2–5 Jan	2,016	±2.2	Realmeter / EKN	35.7	60.8	3.5	25.1
1–2 Jan	1,002	±3.1	Ace Research / Newsis	42	56	3	14
30 Dec – 1 Jan	2,004	±2.2	Jowon C&I / Straight News	40.9	57.6	1.5	16.7

== 2023 ==
Fieldwork date	Sample size	Margin of error	Polling firm	Approve	Disapprove	Und./ no ans.	Net
30–31 Dec	1,018	±3.1	KStat Research / TV Chosun	36	59	5	23
29–31 Dec	1,000	±3.1	Researchview	39	59	2	20
29–30 Dec	1,005	±3.1	Korea Research / MBC	35	59	5	24
28–30 Dec	1,000	±3.1	Hankook Research / KBS	36	56	8	20
26–29 Dec	2,007	±2.2	Realmeter / EKN	37.2	59.6	3.2	22.4
22–23 Dec	1,018	±3.1	Flower Research	32.7	64.5	2.8	31.8
18–22 Dec	2,508	±2.0	Realmeter / EKN	36.3	60.8	2.9	24.5
20–21 Dec	1,006	±3.1	KOPRA	42	56	2	14
18–20 Dec	1,002	±3.1	NBS	33	59	8	26
16–18 Dec	2,001	±2.2	Jowon C&I / Straight News	38.9	59.7	1.5	20.8
15–16 Dec	1,013	±3.1	Flower Research	34.1	62.7	3.2	28.6
11–15 Dec	2,505	±2.0	Realmeter / EKN	36.3	61.2	2.5	24.9
12–14 Dec	1,002	±3.1	Gallup Korea	31	62	7	31
9–11 Dec	1,020	±3.1	Hangil Research / Kukinews	40.7	56.7	2.6	16.0
8–9 Dec	1,017	±3.1	Flower Research	33.2	64.1	2.7	30.9
4–8 Dec	2,509	±2.0	Realmeter / EKN	37.4	59.2	3.4	21.8
5–7 Dec	1,000	±3.1	Gallup Korea	32	59	9	27
4–6 Dec	1,006	±3.1	NBS	32	60	8	28
2–4 Dec	2,016	±2.2	Jowon C&I / Straight News	38.6	59.7	1.7	21.1
1–2 Dec	1,014	±3.1	Flower Research	33.7	63.9	2.4	30.2
27 Nov – 1 Dec	2,507	±2.0	Realmeter / EKN	37.6	59.2	3.2	21.6
28–30 Nov	1,000	±3.1	Researchview	41	57	2	16
28–30 Nov	1,009	±3.1	Gallup Korea	32	60	9	28
24–25 Nov	1,023	±3.1	Flower Research	33.7	63.6	2.7	29.9
20–24 Nov	2,505	±2.0	Realmeter / EKN	38.1	58.9	3.1	20.8
21–23 Nov	1,001	±3.1	Gallup Korea	33	59	8	26
20–22 Nov	1,000	±3.1	NBS	35	56	9	21
18–20 Nov	2,018	±2.2	Jowon C&I / Straight News	38.8	59.1	2.1	20.3
17–18 Nov	1,029	±3.1	Flower Research	32.5	65.0	2.5	32.5
13–17 Nov	2,504	±2.0	Realmeter / EKN	35.6	61.8	2.6	26.2
14–16 Nov	1,001	±3.1	Gallup Korea	34	56	11	22
11–13 Nov	1,005	±3.1	Hangil Research / Kukinews	38.3	58.7	3.0	20.4
10–11 Nov	1,020	±3.1	Flower Research	35.2	63.8	1.0	28.6
6–10 Nov	2,503	±2.0	Realmeter / EKN	34.7	62.2	3.1	27.5
7–9 Nov	1,001	±3.1	Gallup Korea	36	55	9	19
6–8 Nov	1,001	±3.1	NBS	34	60	6	26
4–6 Nov	2,000	±2.2	Jowon C&I / Straight News	35.9	62.2	1.9	26.3
3–4 Nov	1,007	±3.1	Flower Research	33.7	63.9	2.4	30.2
30 Oct – 3 Nov	2,521	±2.0	Realmeter / EKN	36.8	60.2	3.0	23.4
31 Oct – 2 Nov	1,000	±3.1	Gallup Korea	34	58	9	24
30–31 Oct	1,000	±3.1	Researchview	36	62	3	26
27–28 Oct	1,010	±3.1	Flower Research	32.3	65.9	1.8	33.6
23–27 Oct	2,506	±2.0	Realmeter / EKN	35.7	61.9	2.4	26.2
24–26 Oct	1,003	±3.1	Gallup Korea	33	58	9	25
23–25 Oct	1,006	±3.1	NBS	32	58	10	26
21–23 Oct	2,008	±2.2	Jowon C&I / Straight News	32.6	65.4	2.0	32.8
20–21 Oct	1,022	±3.1	Flower Research	30.7	67.5	1.8	36.8
16–20 Oct	2,505	±2.0	Realmeter / EKN	32.5	64.1	3.4	31.6
17–19 Oct	1,000	±3.1	Gallup Korea	30	61	9	31
13–14 Oct	1,004	±3.1	Flower Research	32.4	65.1	2.5	32.7
10–13 Oct	2,004	±2.2	Realmeter / EKN	34.0	62.2	3.8	28.2
10–12 Oct	1,002	±3.1	Gallup Korea	33	58	9	25
9–11 Oct	1,011	±3.1	NBS	35	57	8	22
7–9 Oct	1,000	±3.1	Hangil Research / Kukinews	37.6	59.8	2.6	22.2
7–9 Oct	2,002	±2.2	Jowon C&I / Straight News	38.5	60.1	1.3	21.6
6–7 Oct	1,011	±3.1	Flower Research	35.7	62.5	1.8	26.8
4–6 Oct	1,508	±2.5	Realmeter / EKN	37.7	59.8	2.4	22.1
2–3 Oct	1,000	±3.1	Gongjung / Dailian	40.9	56.8	2.3	15.9
29–30 Sep	1,000	±3.1	Researchview	41	57	1	16
25–27 Sep	1,002	±3.1	NBS	34	58	9	24
25–27 Sep	1,503	±2.5	Realmeter / EKN	36.0	61.1	2.9	25.1
23–25 Sep	2,001	±2.2	Jowon C&I / Straight News	39.0	60.0	1.1	21.0
22–23 Sep	1,017	±3.1	Flower Research	35.0	62.3	2.7	27.3
18–22 Sep	2,514	±2.0	Realmeter / EKN	37.8	59.0	3.1	21.2
19–21 Sep	1,001	±3.1	Gallup Korea	32	59	8	27
16–18 Sep	1,037	±3.0	Hangil Research / Kukinews	35.1	61.1	3.8	26.0
15–16 Sep	1,015	±3.1	Flower Research	34.2	62.9	2.9	28.7
11–15 Sep	2,505	±2.0	Realmeter / EKN	35.5	61.8	2.8	26.3
12–14 Sep	1,000	±3.1	Gallup Korea	31	60	10	29
11–13 Sep	1,002	±3.1	NBS	37	54	10	17
9–11 Sep	2,007	±2.2	Jowon C&I / Straight News	38.9	59.5	1.6	20.6
8–9 Sep	1,009	±3.1	Flower Research	32.0	65.4	2.6	33.4
4–8 Sep	2,515	±2.0	Realmeter / EKN	36.7	59.9	3.5	23.2
5–7 Sep	1,000	±3.1	Gallup Korea	33	58	9	25
1–2 Sep	1,019	±3.1	Flower Research	32.5	65.9	1.6	33.4
28 Aug – 1 Sep	2,505	±2.0	Realmeter / Mediatribune	35.4	61.1	3.5	25.7
29–31 Aug	1,000	±3.1	Researchview	39	58	3	19
29–31 Aug	1,002	±3.1	Gallup Korea	33	59	8	26
28–30 Aug	1,001	±3.1	NBS	33	59	8	26
26–28 Aug	2,018	±2.2	Jowon C&I / Straight News	38.1	60.3	1.6	22.2
25–26 Aug	1,010	±3.1	Flower Research	29.4	68.3	2.3	38.9
21–25 Aug	2,507	±2.0	Realmeter / Mediatribune	37.6	59.4	3.0	21.8
22–24 Aug	1,000	±3.1	Gallup Korea	34	57	10	23
18–19 Aug	1,016	±3.1	Flower Research	36.7	61.4	1.9	24.7
14–18 Aug	2,016	±2.2	Realmeter / Mediatribune	35.6	61.2	3.2	25.6
14–16 Aug	1,002	±3.1	NBS	38	54	8	16
12–14 Aug	2,005	±2.2	Jowon C&I / Straight News	35.8	62.7	1.5	26.9
11–12 Aug	1,022	±3.1	Flower Research	34.1	62.1	3.8	28.0
7–11 Aug	2,516	±2.0	Realmeter / Mediatribune	38.3	59.0	2.7	20.7
8–10 Aug	1,001	±3.1	Gallup Korea	35	57	8	22
4–5 Aug	1,013	±3.1	Flower Research	37.7	59.7	2.6	22.0
31 Jul – 4 Aug	2,532	±1.9	Realmeter / Mediatribune	37.5	59.3	3.1	21.8
1–3 Aug	1,003	±3.1	Gallup Korea	33	56	11	23
31 Jul – 2 Aug	1,001	±3.1	NBS	35	54	11	19
29–31 Jul	2,002	±2.2	Jowon C&I / Straight News	41.2	57.0	1.9	15.8
29–31 Jul	1,000	±3.1	Researchview	40	58	3	18
28–29 Jul	1,012	±3.1	Flower Research	34.7	62.6	2.7	27.9
23–28 Jul	2,517	±2.0	Realmeter / Mediatribune	37.3	59.5	3.2	22.2
25–27 Jul	1,002	±3.1	Gallup Korea	35	55	10	20
22–23 Jul	1,000	±3.1	Jowon C&I / Straight News	38.4	60.4	1.2	22.0
21–22 Jul	1,016	±3.1	Flower Research	35.7	61.9	2.4	26.2
17–21 Jul	2,532	±1.9	Realmeter / Mediatribune	36.6	59.9	3.4	23.3
18–20 Jul	1,001	±3.1	Gallup Korea	33	58	9	25
17–19 Jul	1,001	±3.1	NBS	34	54	12	20
15–17 Jul	2,025	±2.2	Jowon C&I / Straight News	38.3	59.5	2.1	21.2
14–15 Jul	1,020	±3.1	Flower Research	31.9	65.9	2.2	34.0
10–14 Jul	2,507	±2.0	Realmeter / Mediatribune	38.1	58.9	3.0	20.8
11–13 Jul	1,001	±3.1	Gallup Korea	32	57	11	25
8–10 Jul	1,021	±3.1	Hangil Research / Kukinews	36.3	61.6	2.0	25.3
3–7 Jul	2,530	±1.9	Realmeter / Mediatribune	39.1	58.0	2.9	18.9
4–6 Jul	1,000	±3.1	Gallup Korea	38	54	8	16
3–5 Jul	2,005	±2.2	NBS	38	51	10	13
1–3 Jul	2,002	±2.2	Jowon C&I / Straight News	40.2	57.3	2.5	17.1
30 Jun – 1 Jul	1,017	±3.1	Flower Research	36.5	61.6	1.9	25.1
29–30 Jun	1,000	±3.1	Researchview	38	56	6	18
26–30 Jun	2,505	±2.0	Realmeter / Mediatribune	42.0	55.1	2.8	13.1
27–29 Jun	1,007	±3.1	Gallup Korea	36	56	8	20
23–24 Jun	1,017	±3.1	Flower Research	37.0	60.2	2.8	23.2
19–23 Jun	2,510	±2.0	Realmeter / Mediatribune	39.0	57.5	3.5	18.5
20–22 Jun	1,000	±3.1	Gallup Korea	36	57	8	21
19–21 Jun	1,001	±3.1	NBS	36	54	10	18
17–19 Jun	2,002	±2.2	Jowon C&I / Straight News	41.6	56.8	1.6	15.2
16–17 Jun	1,017	±3.1	Flower Research	36.5	60.8	2.7	24.3
12–16 Jun	2,510	±2.0	Realmeter / Mediatribune	38.7	58.0	3.3	19.3
13–15 Jun	1,000	±3.1	Gallup Korea	35	57	8	22
10–12 Jun	1,007	±3.1	Hangil Research / Kukinews	37.9	58.4	3.6	20.5
9–10 Jun	1,016	±3.1	Flower Research	35.4	60.8	3.8	25.4
5–9 Jun	2,004	±2.2	Realmeter / Mediatribune	38.3	59.0	2.7	20.7
5–7 Jun	1,000	±3.1	NBS	35	55	9	20
3–5 Jun	2,001	±2.2	Jowon C&I / Straight News	39.3	58.8	1.9	19.5
2–3 Jun	1,030	±3.1	Flower Research	35.1	62.3	2.6	27.2
30 May – 2 Jun	2,009	±2.2	Realmeter / Mediatribune	39.8	57.4	2.8	17.6
30 May – 1 Jun	1,002	±3.1	Gallup Korea	35	57	8	22
29–31 May	1,000	±3.1	Researchview	36	59	4	23
26–27 May	1,012	±3.1	Flower Research	31.7	64.6	3.7	32.9
22–26 May	2,504	±2.0	Realmeter / Mediatribune	40.0	56.7	3.3	16.7
23–25 May	1,000	±3.1	Gallup Korea	36	57	9	21
22–24 May	1,001	±3.1	NBS	36	56	8	20
20–22 May	2,002	±2.2	Jowon C&I / Straight News	41.2	57.2	1.6	16.0
19–20 May	1,009	±3.1	Flower Research	34.9	61.9	3.2	27.0
15–19 May	2,504	±2.0	Realmeter / Mediatribune	39.0	57.9	3.1	18.9
16–18 May	1,000	±3.1	Gallup Korea	37	56	7	19
12–13 May	1,017	±3.1	Flower Research	35.2	62.2	2.6	27.0
8–12 May	2,503	±2.0	Realmeter / Mediatribune	36.8	60.8	2.4	24.0
9–11 May	1,000	±3.1	Gallup Korea	35	59	6	24
8–10 May	1,007	±3.1	NBS	36	55	9	19
6–8 May	1,020	±3.1	Hangil Research / Kukinews	38.4	56.6	5.1	18.2
6–8 May	2,003	±2.2	Jowon C&I / Straight News	38.1	60.4	1.5	22.3
5–6 May	1,017	±3.1	Flower Research	31.4	65.4	3.2	34.0
2–4 May	1,504	±2.5	Realmeter / Mediatribune	34.6	62.5	2.9	27.9
2–4 May	1,000	±3.1	Gallup Korea	33	57	10	24
29–30 Apr	1,000	±3.1	Researchview	35	62	3	27
28–29 Apr	1,021	±3.1	Flower Research	31.4	65.1	3.5	33.7
23–28 Apr	2,507	±2.0	Realmeter / Mediatribune	34.5	62.6	2.8	28.1
25–27 Apr	1,001	±3.1	Gallup Korea	30	63	7	33
24–26 Apr	1,006	±3.1	NBS	32	57	11	25
22–24 Apr	2,004	±2.2	Jowon C&I / Straight News	34.1	64.9	0.9	30.8
21–22 Apr	1,008	±3.1	Flower Research	31.1	64.8	4.1	33.7
17–21 Apr	2,520	±2.0	Realmeter / Mediatribune	32.6	64.7	2.7	32.1
18–20 Apr	1,003	±3.1	Gallup Korea	31	60	9	29
14–16 Apr	1,015	±3.1	Flower Research	31.3	65.5	3.2	34.2
10–14 Apr	2,506	±2.0	Realmeter / Mediatribune	33.6	63.4	3.0	29.8
11–13 Apr	1,002	±3.1	Gallup Korea	27	65	9	38
10–12 Apr	1,001	±3.1	NBS	34	57	9	23
8–10 Apr	1,007	±3.1	Hangil Research / Kukinews	34.2	64.2	1.6	30.0
8–10 Apr	2,003	±2.2	Jowon C&I / Straight News	35.2	63.3	1.5	28.1
7–8 Apr	1,016	±3.1	Flower Research	33.8	63.2	3.0	29.4
3–7 Apr	2,504	±2.0	Realmeter / Mediatribune	36.4	61.0	2.6	24.6
4–6 Apr	1,000	±3.1	Gallup Korea	31	61	8	30
31 Mar – 1 Apr	1,012	±3.1	Flower Research	33.2	62.7	4.1	29.5
30–31 Mar	1,000	±3.1	Researchview	38	59	3	21
27–31 Mar	2,512	±2.0	Realmeter / Mediatribune	36.7	61.6	1.6	24.9
28–30 Mar	1,000	±3.1	Gallup Korea	30	60	10	30
27–29 Mar	1,001	±3.1	NBS	33	60	7	27
25–27 Mar	2,000	±2.2	Jowon C&I / Straight News	39.8	58.2	2.0	18.4
24–25 Mar	1,024	±3.1	Flower Research	33.3	63.5	3.2	30.2
20–24 Mar	2,506	±2.0	Realmeter / Mediatribune	36.0	61.2	2.8	25.2
21–23 Mar	1,001	±3.1	Gallup Korea	34	58	8	24
19–20 Mar	1,013	±3.1	Jowon C&I / Straight News	36.6	62.1	1.3	25.5
17–18 Mar	1,021	±3.1	Flower Research	33.3	63.7	3.0	30.4
13–17 Mar	2,505	±2.0	Realmeter / Mediatribune	36.8	60.4	2.7	23.6
14–16 Mar	1,003	±3.1	Gallup Korea	33	60	7	27
13–15 Mar	1,005	±3.1	NBS	35	57	8	22
11–13 Mar	2,004	±2.2	Jowon C&I / Straight News	39.6	58.9	1.5	19.3
10–11 Mar	1,024	±3.1	Flower Research	33.3	63.2	3.5	29.9
6–10 Mar	2,508	±2.0	Realmeter / Mediatribune	38.9	58.9	2.3	20.0
8–9 Mar	1,002	±3.1	Gallup Korea	34	58	8	24
4–6 Mar	1,000	±3.1	Hangil Research / Kukinews	44.1	53.8	2.2	9.7
3–4 Mar	1,028	±3.1	Flower Research	33.3	64.2	2.5	30.9
27 Feb – 3 Mar	2,006	±2.2	Realmeter / Mediatribune	42.9	53.2	3.9	10.3
28 Feb – 2 Mar	1,001	±3.1	Gallup Korea	36	55	8	19
27 Feb – 1 Mar	1,010	±3.1	NBS	37	51	12	14
27–28 Feb	1,000	±3.1	Researchview	41	56	3	15
25–27 Feb	2,001	±2.2	Jowon C&I / Straight News	38.1	60.3	1.6	22.2
23–25 Feb	1,026	±3.1	Flower Research	32.6	59.5	7.9	26.9
20–24 Feb	2,509	±2.0	Realmeter / Mediatribune	40.4	57.0	2.7	16.6
21–23 Feb	1,000	±3.1	Gallup Korea	37	56	7	19
17–18 Feb	1,018	±3.1	Flower Research	36.5	56.4	7.1	19.9
13–17 Feb	2,504	±2.0	Realmeter / Mediatribune	40.4	57.5	2.2	17.1
14–16 Feb	1,000	±3.1	Gallup Korea	35	58	8	23
13–15 Feb	1,000	±3.1	NBS	36	55	9	19
11–13 Feb	2,005	±2.2	Jowon C&I / Straight News	39.3	59.1	1.6	19.8
10–11 Feb	1,011	±3.1	Flower Research	34.9	59.8	5.3	24.9
6–10 Feb	2,506	±2.0	Realmeter / Mediatribune	36.9	60.3	2.8	23.4
7–9 Feb	1,002	±3.1	Gallup Korea	32	59	9	27
4–6 Feb	1,246	±2.8	Hangil Research / Kukinews	41.4	56.0	2.6	14.6
3–4 Feb	1,018	±3.1	Flower Research	35.2	59.8	5.0	24.6
30 Jan – 3 Feb	2,511	±2.0	Realmeter / Mediatribune	39.3	57.8	2.9	18.5
31 Jan – 2 Feb	1,001	±3.1	Gallup Korea	34	56	10	22
30 Jan – 1 Feb	1,001	±3.1	NBS	36	55	9	19
30–31 Jan	1,000	±3.1	Researchview	37	61	3	24
28–30 Jan	2,005	±2.2	Jowon C&I / Straight News	40.3	57.9	1.8	17.6
27–28 Jan	1,032	±3.1	Flower Research	37.4	56.0	6.6	18.6
25–27 Jan	1,504	±2.5	Realmeter / Mediatribune	37.0	59.8	3.2	22.8
18–20 Jan	1,000	±3.1	Hankook Research / KBS	36.3	54.7	9.0	18.4
16–20 Jan	2,515	±2.0	Realmeter / Mediatribune	38.7	58.8	2.5	20.1
18–19 Jan	1,001	±3.1	Korea Research / MBC	37.5	54.8	7.8	17.3
17–19 Jan	1,000	±3.1	Gallup Korea	36	55	10	19
14–16 Jan	2,007	±2.2	Jowon C&I / Straight News	42.4	55.9	1.6	13.5
9–13 Jan	2,508	±2.0	Realmeter / Mediatribune	39.3	58.4	2.3	19.1
10–12 Jan	1,002	±3.1	Gallup Korea	35	57	9	22
9–11 Jan	1,008	±3.1	NBS	37	54	9	17
7–9 Jan	1,020	±3.1	Hangil Research / Kukinews	38.0	58.0	4.0	20.0
6–7 Jan	1,024	±3.1	Flower Research	32.4	61.6	6.0	29.2
2–6 Jan	2,505	±2.0	Realmeter / Mediatribune	40.9	55.9	3.1	15.0
3–5 Jan	1,002	±3.1	Gallup Korea	37	54	9	17
1–2 Jan	1,020	±3.1	Rnsearch / Mewspim	39.5	57.8	2.7	18.3

== 2022 ==
Fieldwork date	Sample size	Margin of error	Polling firm	Approve	Disapprove	Und./ no ans.	Net
30–31 Dec	1,005	±3.1	Next Research / SBS	36.8	54.7	8.5	17.9
30–31 Dec	1,000	±3.1	Researchview	39	58	3	19
26–30 Dec	2,511	±2.0	Realmeter / Mediatribune	40.0	57.2	2.8	17.2
26–28 Dec	1,010	±3.1	NBS	34	56	10	22
19–23 Dec	2,518	±2.0	Realmeter / Mediatribune	41.2	56.6	2.2	15.4
19–21 Dec	1,050	±3.1	Media Tomato / News Tomato	40.2	58.1	1.7	17.9
17–19 Dec	1,018	±3.1	Hangil Research / Kukinews	41.8	56.1	2.0	14.3
17–19 Dec	1,000	±3.1	Jowon C&I / Straight News	39.7	59.4	0.9	19.7
16–17 Dec	1,016	±3.1	Flower Research	34.6	59.3	6.1	24.7
12–16 Dec	2,509	±2.0	Realmeter / Mediatribune	41.1	56.8	2.1	15.7
13–15 Dec	1,001	±3.1	Gallup Korea	36	56	8	20
12–14 Dec	1,000	±3.1	NBS	34	56	10	22
5–9 Dec	2,504	±2.0	Realmeter / Mediatribune	38.4	58.8	2.8	20.4
6–8 Dec	1,000	±3.1	Gallup Korea	33	59	8	26
3–5 Dec	1,002	±3.1	Jowon C&I / Straight News	38.4	60.2	1.4	21.8
28 Nov – 2 Dec	2,507	±2.0	Realmeter / Mediatribune	38.9	58.9	2.2	20.0
29 Nov – 1 Dec	1,000	±3.1	Gallup Korea	31	60	9	29
29–30 Nov	1,000	±3.1	Researchview	36	61	3	25
28–30 Nov	1,003	±3.1	NBS	32	60	8	28
25–26 Nov	1,005	±3.1	Flower Research	31.6	64.3	4.2	32.7
21–25 Nov	2,514	±2.0	Realmeter / Mediatribune	36.4	60.8	2.8	24.4
22–24 Nov	1,002	±3.1	Gallup Korea	30	62	7	32
19–21 Nov	1,000	±3.1	Jowon C&I / Straight News	35.5	63.7	0.9	28.2
14–18 Nov	2,516	±2.0	Realmeter / Mediatribune	33.4	63.8	2.8	30.4
15–17 Nov	1,002	±3.1	Gallup Korea	29	61	10	32
14–16 Nov	1,007	±3.1	NBS	29	62	9	33
7–11 Nov	2,510	±2.0	Realmeter / Mediatribune	34.6	63.4	2.0	28.8
8–10 Nov	1,006	±3.1	Gallup Korea	30	62	8	32
5–7 Nov	1,104	±2.9	Hangil Research / Kukinews	33.6	63.6	2.7	30.0
5–7 Nov	1,003	±3.1	Jowon C&I / Straight News	34.4	65.1	0.5	30.7
31 Oct – 4 Nov	2,521	±2.0	Realmeter / Mediatribune	34.2	62.4	3.4	28.2
1–3 Nov	1,001	±3.1	Gallup Korea	29	63	9	34
31 Oct – 2 Nov	1,005	±3.1	NBS	31	60	9	29
30–31 Oct	1,000	±3.1	Researchview	35	63	2	28
28–29 Oct	1,012	±3.1	Flower Research	31.8	61.4	6.8	29.6
24–28 Oct	2,521	±2.0	Realmeter / Mediatribune	35.7	61.7	2.6	26.0
25–27 Oct	1,001	±3.1	Gallup Korea	30	62	8	32
22–24 Oct	1,000	±3.1	Jowon C&I / Straight News	33.0	65.7	1.4	32.7
17–21 Oct	2,512	±2.0	Realmeter / Mediatribune	32.9	64.4	2.8	31.5
18–20 Oct	1,000	±3.1	Gallup Korea	27	65	8	38
17–19 Oct	1,000	±3.1	NBS	31	59	10	28
11–14 Oct	2,014	±2.2	Realmeter / Mediatribune	33.1	64.2	2.7	31.1
11–13 Oct	1,002	±3.1	Gallup Korea	28	63	9	35
8–10 Oct	1,024	±3.1	Hangil Research / Kukinews	31.3	67.0	1.7	35.7
8–10 Oct	1,006	±3.1	Jowon C&I / Straight News	31.9	67.2	0.9	35.3
4–7 Oct	2,012	±2.2	Realmeter / Mediatribune	32.0	65.8	2.2	33.8
4–6 Oct	1,002	±3.1	Gallup Korea	29	63	8	34
3–5 Oct	1,000	±3.1	NBS	29	65	7	36
29–30 Sep	1,000	±3.1	Researchview	33	65	2	32
26–30 Sep	2,522	±2.0	Realmeter / Mediatribune	31.2	66.0	2.8	34.8
27–29 Sep	1,000	±3.1	Gallup Korea	24	65	11	41
24–26 Sep	1,002	±3.1	Jowon C&I / Straight News	27.7	71.3	1.0	43.6
19–23 Sep	2,533	±2.0	Realmeter / Mediatribune	34.6	62.2	3.2	27.6
20–22 Sep	1,000	±3.1	Gallup Korea	28	61	11	33
19–21 Sep	1,000	±3.1	NBS	32	60	8	28
17–19 Sep	1,000	±3.1	Hangil Research / Kukinews	37.8	60.0	2.1	22.2
13–16 Sep	2,015	±2.2	Realmeter / Mediatribune	34.4	63.2	2.4	28.8
13–15 Sep	1,000	±3.1	Gallup Korea	33	59	8	26
5–8 Sep	2,006	±2.2	Realmeter / Mediatribune	32.6	64.6	2.8	32.0
5–7 Sep	1,000	±3.1	NBS	32	59	9	27
4 Sep	1,001	±3.1	Jowon C&I / Straight News	31.4	66.8	1.8	35.4
29 Aug – 2 Sep	2,516	±2.0	Realmeter / Mediatribune	32.3	64.9	2.8	32.6
30 Aug – 1 Sep	1,000	±3.1	Gallup Korea	27	63	10	36
30–31 Aug	1,000	±3.1	Researchview	33	65	2	32
28–30 Aug	1,002	±3.1	Jowon C&I / Straight News	34.1	64.4	1.5	30.3
22–26 Aug	2,513	±2.0	Realmeter / Mediatribune	33.6	63.3	3.1	29.7
23–25 Aug	1,001	±3.1	Gallup Korea	27	64	10	37
22–24 Aug	1,001	±3.1	NBS	32	63	5	31
16–19 Aug	2,011	±2.2	Realmeter / Mediatribune	32.2	65.8	2.0	33.6
16–18 Aug	1,000	±3.1	Gallup Korea	28	64	8	36
12–13 Aug	1,001	±3.1	Jowon C&I / Straight News	29.7	68.6	1.8	38.9
8–12 Aug	2,515	±2.0	Realmeter / Mediatribune	30.4	67.2	2.4	36.8
9–11 Aug	1,000	±3.1	Gallup Korea	25	66	8	41
8–10 Aug	1,008	±3.1	NBS	28	65	7	37
6–8 Aug	1,006	±3.1	Hangil Research / Kukinews	31.0	67.0	2.1	36.0
5–6 Aug	1,002	±3.1	KSOI / TBS	27.5	70.1	2.4	42.6
1–5 Aug	2,528	±1.9	Realmeter / Mediatribune	29.3	67.8	2.9	38.5
2–4 Aug	1,001	±3.1	Gallup Korea	24	66	10	42
30 Jul – 1 Aug	1,001	±3.1	Jowon C&I / Straight News	29.8	67.4	2.7	37.6
30–31 Jul	1,000	±3.1	Researchview	30	68	2	38
29–30 Jul	1,003	±3.1	KSOI / TBS	28.9	68.5	2.6	39.6
25–29 Jul	2,519	±2.0	Realmeter / Mediatribune	33.1	64.5	2.3	31.4
26–28 Jul	1,000	±3.1	Gallup Korea	28	62	11	34
25–27 Jul	1,006	±3.1	NBS	34	54	12	20
22–23 Jul	1,002	±3.1	KSOI / TBS	32.2	64.5	3.4	32.3
18–22 Jul	2,527	±1.9	Realmeter / Mediatribune	33.3	63.4	3.3	30.1
19–21 Jul	1,000	±3.1	Gallup Korea	32	60	9	28
16–18 Jul	1,000	±3.1	Jowon C&I / Straight News	32.9	65.2	1.9	32.3
15–16 Jul	1,000	±3.1	KSOI / TBS	32.0	63.7	4.3	31.7
11–15 Jul	2,519	±2.0	Realmeter / Mediatribune	33.4	63.3	3.3	29.9
12–14 Jul	1,003	±3.1	Gallup Korea	32	53	15	21
11–13 Jul	1,001	±3.1	NBS	33	53	14	20
9–11 Jul	1,017	±3.1	Hangil Research / Kukinews	37.8	59.2	3.1	21.4
8–9 Jul	1,002	±3.1	KSOI / TBS	34.5	60.8	4.7	26.3
4–8 Jul	2,525	±2.0	Realmeter / Mediatribune	37.0	57.0	6.0	20.0
5–7 Jul	1,000	±3.1	Gallup Korea	37	49	14	12
2–4 Jul	1,028	±3.1	Rnsearch / Newspim	42.6	53.0	4.4	10.4
2–4 Jul	1,000	±3.1	Jowon C&I / Straight News	45.9	52.6	1.5	6.7
1–2 Jul	1,002	±3.1	KSOI / TBS	42.8	51.9	5.4	9.1
27 Jun – 1 Jul	2,514	±2.0	Realmeter	44.4	50.2	5.4	5.8
28–30 Jun	1,000	±3.1	Researchview	45	51	5	6
28–30 Jun	1,000	±3.1	Gallup Korea	43	42	15	1
27–29 Jun	1,002	±3.1	NBS	45	37	19	8
25–28 Jun	1,037	±3.0	Rnsearch / Newspim	45.3	49.8	4.9	4.5
24–25 Jun	1,001	±3.1	KSOI / TBS	46.8	47.4	5.9	0.6
20–24 Jun	2,515	±2.0	Realmeter	46.6	47.7	5.4	1.1
21–23 Jun	1,000	±3.1	Gallup Korea	47	38	15	9
18–21 Jun	1,004	±3.1	Rnsearch / Newspim	47.6	47.9	4.6	0.3
18–20 Jun	1,000	±3.1	Jowon C&I / Straight News	48.6	48.7	2.7	0.1
17–18 Jun	1,000	±3.1	KSOI / TBS	49.4	44.8	5.7	4.6
13–17 Jun	2,529	±1.9	Realmeter	48.0	45.4	6.6	2.6
14–16 Jun	1,000	±3.1	Gallup Korea	49	38	14	11
13–15 Jun	1,003	±3.1	NBS	49	32	19	17
11–13 Jun	1,004	±3.1	Hangil Research / Kukinews	51.2	42.1	6.7	9.1
11–13 Jun	1,025	±3.1	Rnsearch / Newspim	52.5	42.9	4.6	9.6
10–11 Jun	1,000	±3.1	KSOI / TBS	50.3	42.6	7.1	7.7
7–10 Jun	2,009	±2.2	Realmeter	48.0	45.4	6.6	2.6
7–9 Jun	1,000	±3.1	Gallup Korea	53	33	14	20
4–6 Jun	1,017	±3.1	Rnsearch / Newspim	52.1	40.2	7.6	11.9
4–6 Jun	1,001	±3.1	Jowon C&I / Straight News	54.4	41.7	3.9	12.7
30 May – 3 Jun	2,007	±2.2	Realmeter	52.1	40.3	7.6	11.8
2 Jun	1,001	±3.1	Gallup Korea	53	34	13	19
30 May – 1 Jun	1,014	±3.1	NBS	54	27	20	27
28–30 May	1,000	±3.1	Researchview	53	40	7	13
27–28 May	1,002	±3.1	KSOI / TBS	56.3	36.1	7.6	20.2
23–27 May	2,516	±2.0	Realmeter	52.1	40.3	7.6	11.8
21–23 May	1,000	±3.1	Jowon C&I / Straight News	52.7	42.8	4.5	9.9
16–20 May	2,528	±1.9	Realmeter	52.1	40.6	7.3	11.5
17–19 May	1,000	±3.1	Gallup Korea	51	34	15	17
16–18 May	1,011	±3.1	NBS	48	29	23	19
14–16 May	1,011	±3.1	Hangil Research / Kukinews	50.3	43.3	6.3	7.0
13–14 May	1,000	±3.1	KSOI / TBS	50.1	42.7	7.2	7.4
9–13 May	2,526	±1.9	Realmeter	51.2	44.2	4.6	7.0
10–12 May	1,000	±3.1	Gallup Korea	52	37	12	15

== See also ==
- Opinion polling for the 2022 South Korean presidential election
- Opinion polling on the Lee Jae Myung presidency
